= List of world records in masters athletics =

Masters athletics is a class of the sport of athletics for athletes of over 35 years of age. The events include track and field, road running and cross country running. These are the current world records in various five-year-groups, maintained by WMA, the World Association of Masters Athletes, which is designated by the World Athletics (formerly IAAF) to conduct the worldwide sport of Masters (Veterans) Athletics (Track and Field). Starting at age 35, each age group starts on the athlete's birthday in years that are evenly divisible by 5 and extends until the next such occurrence. For record purposes, older athletes are not included in younger age groups, except in the case of relay team members. A relay team's age group is determined by the age of the youngest member.

Some Masters events (hurdles, throwing implements) have modified specifications. The combined events use an age-graded result applied against the standard scoring table.

Key to tables below: awaiting ratification not kept by WMA approved as European record, but not yet as world record not ratified or later rescinded by WMA better indoor record

== Men ==
=== 100 metres ===
Age group	Record	Athlete	Nationality	Birthdate	Age	Date	Place	Meet	Ref.	Video
M 35 (progression)	9.87 (−0.1 m/s)	Justin Gatlin	United States	10 February 1982	37	30 June 2019	Stanford, United States	Prefontaine Classic		
M 40 (progression)	9.93 (+1.9 m/s)	Kim Collins	Saint Kitts and Nevis	5 April 1976	40	29 May 2016	Bottrop, Germany	NRW-Gala		Video on YouTube
M 45 (progression)	10.72 (+1.0 m/s)	Willie Gault	United States	5 September 1960	45	24 June 2006	Indianapolis, United States	USA Championships		
M 45 (progression)	10.72 (±0.0 m/s)	Lion Martinez	Sweden	26 January 1978	45	19 August 2023	Regensdorf, Switzerland	Abendmeeting Regensdorf		
M 50 (progression)	10.88 (+1.8 m/s)	Willie Gault	United States	5 September 1960	50	7 May 2011	Eagle Rock, United States	Occidental Invitational		
M 55 (progression)
M 55 (progression)	11.30 (±0.0 m/s)	Willie Gault	United States	5 September 1960	55	7 May 2016	Eagle Rock, United States	Occidental Invitational		
M 60 (progression)	11.66 (+0.1 m/s)	Mario Longo	Italy	21 August 1964	60	5 July 2025	Nocera Inferiore, Italy	Regional Masters Championships		
M 65 (progression)	12.03 (+0.6 m/s)	John Wright	Great Britain	15 June 1959	67	23 August 2026	Daegu, South Korea	World Masters Championships		
M 70 (progression)	12.59 (−0.2 m/s)	Damien Leake	United States	21 August 1952	70	27 May 2023	Los Angeles, United States	USATF LA Grand Prix		
M 75 (progression)	13.25 (+0.8 m/s)	Kenton Brown	United States	3 September 1944	76	3 October 2020	Marble Falls, United States	Lions Texas vs The World		
M 80 (progression)	14.16 (+0.4 m/s)	Kenton Brown	United States	3 September 1944	81	23 August 2026	Daegu, South Korea	World Masters Championships		
M 85 (progression)	15.08 (+1.9 m/s)	Hiroo Tanaka	Japan	8 December 1930	86	25 June 2017	Akita, Japan	Akita Masters Championships		
M 90 (progression)	16.69 (−0.6 m/s)	Hiroo Tanaka	Japan	8 December 1930	90	29 August 2021	Hirosaki, Japan	Aomori Masters Championships		
M 95	20.41 (+0.1 m/s)	Frederico Fischer	Brazil	6 January 1917	95	30 June 2012	Porto Alegre, Brazil	Brazil Masters Championships		
M 100	26.74 (+2.0 m/s)	Toshio Kamehama	Japan	18 October 1925	100	2 November 2025	Okinawa, Japan	Okinawa Masters Championships		
M 100	26.34 (±0.0 m/s)	Lester Wright sr	United States	29 April 1922	100	30 April 2022	Philadelphia, United States	Penn Relays		
M 105	34.50 (−0.1 m/s)	Stanisław Kowalski	Poland	10 April 1910	105	28 June 2015	Toruń, Poland	Polish Masters Championships		

=== 200 metres ===
Age group	Record	Athlete	Nationality	Birthdate	Age	Date	Place	Meet	Ref.	Video
M 35 (progression)	20.11 (+1.9 m/s)	Linford Christie	Great Britain	2 April 1960	35	25 June 1995	Villeneuve-d'Ascq, France	European Cup		
M 35 (progression)	20.06 A (+2.0 m/s)	Isaac Makwala	Botswana	24 September 1985	35	18 September 2021	Nairobi, Kenya	Kip Keino Classic		
M 40 (progression)	20.64 (+0.7 m/s)	Troy Douglas	Netherlands	30 November 1962	40	27 August 2003	Paris, France	World Championships		
M 40 (progression)	20.64 (+1.3 m/s)	Troy Douglas	Netherlands	30 November 1962	40	9 August 2003	Utrecht, Netherlands	Druppers Meeting		
M 45 (progression)	21.65 (±0.0 m/s)	Alexander Kosenkow	Germany	14 March 1977	45	23 July 2022	Minden, Germany	National Meeting		
M 50 (progression)	22.44 (+1.2 m/s)	Willie Gault	United States	5 September 1960	50	7 May 2011	Eagle Rock, United States	Occidental Invitational		
M 55 (progression)	23.04 (+1.7 m/s)	Darren Scott	Great Britain	7 March 1969	55	8 September 2024	Stratford, United Kingdom	Stratford Speed GP		
M 60 (progression)	24.00 (−0.3 m/s)	Ronald Taylor	Great Britain	4 December 1933	60	10 June 1994	Athens, Greece	European Masters Championships		
M 65 (progression)	24.47 (+0.8 m/s)	John Wright	Great Britain	15 June 1959	66	23 August 2025	Sheffield, United Kingdom	Masters Grand Prix & Open		
M 70 (progression)	25.75 (+1.7 m/s)	Charles Allie	United States	20 August 1947	70	21 June 2018	Des Moines, United States	USATF Open Nationals		
M 75 (progression)	27.60 (+1.6 m/s)	Michael Kish	United States	1952	75	19 July 2026	Geneva, United States	USATF Masters Championships		
M 80 (progression)	29.49 (+0.3 m/s)	Kenton Brown	United States	3 September 1944	81	7 October 2025	St. George, United States	Huntsman Senior Games		
M 80 (progression)	29.15 i	Robert Lida	United States	11 November 1936	80	23 March 2017	Daegu, South Korea	World Masters Championships indoor		
M 85 (progression)	31.69 (−0.3 m/s)	Hijiya Hisamitsu	Japan	11 September 1931	85	17 September 2016	Niigata, Japan	Japan Masters Championships		
M 90 (progression)	36.02 (+1.1 m/s)	Hiroo Tanaka	Japan	8 December 1930	90	23 May 2021	Rokkasho, Japan	Aomori Masters Championships		
M 95	48.09 (±0.0 m/s)	Toshio Kamehama	Japan	18 October 1925	96	16 October 2022	Okinawa, Japan	Okinawa Masters Championships		
M 95	46.82 (−0.1 m/s)	Yoshiyuki Shimizu	Brazil	14 July 1928	95	19 August 2023	São Paulo, Brazil	Campeonato Paulista de Atletismo Masters		
M 95	45.34 (−0.7 m/s)	Yoshiyuki Shimizu	Brazil	14 July 1928	95	21 October 2023	Recife, Brazil	Brazilian Masters Championships		
M 100	77.59 (+1.5 m/s)	Philip Rabinowitz	South Africa	16 February 1904	100	17 December 2004	Cape Town, South Africa	Open meeting		

=== 400 metres ===
Age group	Record	Athlete	Nationality	Birthdate	Age	Date	Place	Meet	Ref.
M 35 (progression)	44.54	Chris Brown	Bahamas	15 October 1978	36	30 May 2015	Eugene, United States	Prefontaine Classic	
M 35 (progression)	44.47	Isaac Makwala	Botswana	24 September 1985	35	20 June 2021	Chorzów, Poland	Janusz Kusociński Memorial	
M 40 (progression)	47.81	Enrico Saraceni	Italy	19 May 1964	40	28 July 2004	Aarhus, Denmark	European Masters Championships	
M 40 (progression)	47.48	Mahau Suguimati	Brazil	13 November 1984	40	5 May 2025	Mito, Japan	Mito invitational	
M 40 (progression)	46.96	Sandro Viana	Brazil	26 March 1977	40	1 July 2017	São Bernardo do Campo, Brazil	Desafio Brasil	
M 45 (progression)	48.55	Ricardo Menendez Gonzalez	Spain	26 August 1978	45	6 July 2024	Alcobendas, Spain	Spain Masters Championships	
M 50 (progression)	50.51	Juan Luis Lopez Anaya	Spain	14 May 1970	51	16 July 2021	Granada, Spain	Control Extraordinario Granada	
M 55 (progression)	51.18	Timothy Munnings	Bahamas	22 June 1966	58	15 February 2025	Nassau, Bahamas	19th Diana Lynn Thompson Classic	
M 60 (progression)	53.88	Ralph Romain	Trinidad and Tobago	20 July 1932	63	22 July 1995	Buffalo, United States	World Masters Championships	
M 65 (progression)	56.09	Charles Allie	United States	20 August 1947	65	18 May 2013	Raleigh, United States	Southeastern Masters	
M 65 (progression)	54.92 i	B. John Wright	Great Britain	15 June 1959	66	29 March 2026	Toruń, Poland	European Masters Indoor Championhips	
M 70 (progression)	57.26	Charles Allie	United States	20 August 1947	71	11 September 2018	Málaga, Spain	World Masters Championships	
M 75 (progression)	1:02.40	Guido Müller	Germany	22 December 1938	75	28 June 2014	Elsenfeld, Germany	Bayern Regional Championships	
M 80 (progression)	1:10.01	Hijiya Hisamitsu	Japan	11 September 1931	81	9 September 2012	Miyazaki, Japan	Miyazaki Masters Championships	
M 85 (progression)	1:17.12	Earl Fee	Canada	22 March 1929	85	12 July 2014	Toronto, Canada	Canada Masters Championships	
M 90 (progression)	1:29.15	Earl Fee	Canada	22 March 1929	90	19 July 2019	Toronto, Canada	NCCWMA	
M 95	2:21.82	Orville Rogers	United States	28 November 1917	95	12 July 2013	Olathe, United States	USATF Masters Championships	
M 95	2:17.45	Orville Rogers	United States	28 November 1917	95	15 June 2013	Coppell, United States	Texas Masters Championships	
M 100	3:30.26	Yoshimitsu Miyauchi	Japan	20 July 1924	100	10 November 2024	Kirishima, Japan	Kagoshima Masters Record Session	

=== 800 metres ===
Age group	Record	Athlete	Nationality	Birthdate	Age	Date	Place	Meet	Ref.
M 35 (progression)	1:43.36	Johnny Gray	United States	19 June 1960	35	16 August 1995	Zurich, Switzerland	Weltklasse Zürich	
M 40 (progression)
M 40 (progression)	1:48.05	Anthony Whiteman	Great Britain	13 November 1971	42	12 July 2014	Stretford, United Kingdom	BMC Stretford Grand Prix	
M 45 (progression)	1:49.86	Anthony Whiteman	Great Britain	13 November 1971	45	19 August 2017	Stretford, United Kingdom	BMC Stretford Grand Prix	
M 50 (progression)	1:56.33	Zac Ashkanasy	Australia	10 July 1973	52	20 January 2026	Doncaster, Australia	VMC Meet #3	
M 55 (progression)	2:02.53	Andrew Larasen	Netherlands	23 September 1970	55	18 October 2025	Madeira, Portugal	European Masters Championships	
M 55 (progression)	2:01.63	Anselm LeBourne	United States	20 April 1959	55	10 June 2014	New York City, United States	NYRR Tuesday Night Speed	
M 55 (progression)	2:02.16	Anselm LeBourne	United States	20 April 1959	56	19 May 2015	Randalls Island, United States	USATF New York Twilight Meet 1	
M 55 (progression)	2:02.45 i	Shane Healy	Ireland	5 October 1968	55	27 January 2024	Abbotstown, Ireland		
M 60 (progression)	2:06.67	Andrew Ridley	Great Britain	24 July 1964	61	20 May 2026	Winchester, United Kingdom	WADAC Spring Evening Open	
M 65 (progression)	2:13.74	Paul Forbes	Great Britain	20 November 1956	66	29 September 2023	Pescara, Italy	European Masters Championships	
M 70 (progression)	2:20.52	Earl Fee	Canada	22 March 1929	70	17 June 1999	Hamilton, Canada		
M 70 (progression)	2:20.45 i	Earl Fee	Canada	22 March 1929	70	28 March 1999	Boston, United States	USATF Masters Championships indoor	
M 75 (progression)	2:30.59	José Vicente Rioseco López	Spain	30 April 1941	75	18 June 2016	Vilagarcia, Spain	Galicia Masters Championships	
M 80 (progression)	2:41.59	José Vicente Rioseco López	Spain	30 April 1941	80	30 April 2021	A Coruña, Spain	Galicia Control de marcas	
M 85 (progression)	2:59.50	Jean Louis Esnault	France	19 January 1940	85	5 July 2025	Issy Les Moulineaux, France	3° Meeting d'Issy Les Moulineaux	
M 90 (progression)	3:34.93	Earl Fee	Canada	22 March 1929	90	22 June 2019	Toronto, Canada	Ontario Masters Championships	
M 95	4:51.44	Antonio Nacca	Italy	16 December 1923	95	9 June 2019	Asti, Italy	Italian Masters Clubs Championships Regional	
M 95	4:41.92 i	Earl Fee	Canada	22 March 1929	95	16 March 2025	Toronto, Canada	Ontario Master Indoor Championship	
M 100	8:09.74	Yoshimitsu Miyauchi	Japan	20 July 1924	100	21 September 2024	Kyoto, Japan	Japan Masters Championships	

=== 1500 metres ===
Age group	Record	Athlete	Nationality	Birthdate	Age	Date	Place	Meet	Ref.
M 35 (progression)	3:32.51	Bernard Lagat	United States	12 December 1974	35	22 July 2010	Monaco	Herculis	
M 35 (progression)	3:32.45	William Tanui	Kenya	22 February 1964	35	16 June 1999	Athens, Greece	Tsiklitiri	
M 40 (progression)	3:41.87	Bernard Lagat	United States	12 December 1974	40	7 June 2015	Birmingham, United Kingdom	Sainsbury's Birmingham Grand Prix	
M 40 (progression)	3:40.20 i	Bernard Lagat	United States	12 December 1974	40	14 February 2015	New York, United States	Millrose Games	
M 45 (progression)	3:48.72	Anthony Whiteman	Great Britain	13 November 1971	45	8 July 2017	Loughborough, United Kingdom	BMC Grand Prix	
M 50 (progression)	3:57.71	Zachariah Ashkanasy	Australia	10 July 1973	51	27 March 2025	Melbourne, Australia	Box Hill Classic	
M 55 (progression)	4:11.95	Robert Godino	Australia	11 October 1969	56	30 October 2025	Brisbane, Australia	UQ 1500 Metre Classic	
M 55 (progression)	4:11.79	Konishi Wataru	Japan	5 November 1967	55	20 May 2023	Tochigi, Japan	East Japan Business Team Championships	
M 60 (progression)	4:21.21	Andrew Ridley	Great Britain	24 July 1964	61	13 August 2025	Guildford, United Kingdom	Guildford Middle Distance Open	
M 65 (progression)	4:39.15	Paul Forbes	Great Britain	20 November 1956	66	28 July 2023	Glasgow, United Kingdom	GAA Miler Meeting	
M 70 (progression)	4:52.95	Ron Robertson	New Zealand	3 June 1941	70	15 July 2011	Sacramento, United States	World Masters Championships	
M 75 (progression)	5:11.05	Cees Stolwijk	Netherlands	10 January 1950	75	25 March 2025	Amersfoort, Netherlands	Keistad Baancompetitie 1500 meter	
M 80 (progression)	5:30.89	José Vicente Rioseco López	Spain	30 April 1941	80	19 June 2021	Málaga, Spain	Spanish Masters Championships	
M 85 (progression)	6:08.61	Manuel Alonso Domingo	Spain	21 March 1936	85	19 June 2021 (Note: 1 May 2021 by WMA source, a typo (date and location of previous record))	Málaga, Spain	Spanish Masters Championships	
M 85 (progression)	6:08.47 i	Jean-Louis Esnault	France	19 January 1940	85	29 March 2025	Gainesville, United States	World Masters Indoor Championships	
M 90 (progression)	7:12.71	Manuel Alonso Domingo	Spain	21 March 1936	90	11 July 2026	A Coruña, Spain	Spain Final Masters Clubs Championships	
M 95	10:10.88	Yoshimitsu Miyauchi	Japan	20 July 1924	95	13 September 2019	Gunma, Japan	Japan Masters Championships	
M 100	16:01.54	Yoshimitsu Miyauchi	Japan	20 July 1924	100	10 November 2024	Kirishima, Japan	Kagoshima Masters Record Session	

=== Mile ===
Age group	Record	Athlete	Nationality	Birthdate	Age	Date	Place	Meet	Ref.	Video
M 35	3:51.38	Bernard Lagat	United States	12 December 1974	36	6 August 2011	London, United Kingdom	London Grand Prix		
M 40 (progression)
M 40 (progression)	3:57.91	Bernard Lagat	United States	12 December 1974	40	25 July 2015	London, United Kingdom	London Grand Prix		
M 40 (progression)	3:54.91 i	Bernard Lagat	United States	12 December 1974	40	14 February 2015	New York City, United States	Millrose Games		
M 45	4:13.96	Davide Raineri	Italy	21 May 1973	46	6 June 2019	Rome, Italy	Golden Gala		
M 45	4:10.30	Davide Raineri	Italy	21 May 1973	47	5 September 2020	San Donato Milanese, Italy	30° Miglio Ambrosiano		
M 45	4:10.0 h	Anthony Whiteman	Great Britain	13 November 1971	45	12 August 2017	Cardiff, United Kingdom	Night of Endurance		
M 45	4:12.94 i (Note: A faster indoor mark, 4:12.33, was achieved by John Trautmann on 14 February 2015, but that performance was never ratified by WMA.)	Anthony Whiteman	Great Britain	13 November 1971	45	1 February 2017	London, United Kingdom	Soar Open		
M 50	4:17.19	José Antonio Alcaraz Pérez	Spain	24 November 1975	50	30 May 2026	Toledo, Spain	Trofeo Corpus		
M 55	4:29.60	Robert Godino	Australia	11 October 1969	55	30 November 2024	Brisbane, Australia	UQ 1500 Metre Classic - Celebration Mile		
M 60	4:41.81	Andrew Ridley	Great Britain	24 July 1964	60	31 July 2024	Guildford, United Kingdom	Guildford Centenary Mile Night		
M 65	4:56.4 h	Derek Turnbull	New Zealand	5 December 1926	65	29 February 1992	Christchurch, New Zealand			
M 70	5:19.75	Joop Rüter	Netherlands	19 April 1933	70	11 July 2003	Rotterdam, Netherlands			
M 75	5:36.09	Cees Stolwijk	Netherlands	10 January 1950	75	21 May 2025	Dronten, Netherlands	Avondwedstrijd Av Delta		
M 80 (progression)	5:56.93	José Vicente Rioseco López	Spain	30 April 1941	80	18 July 2021	Vigo, Spain	Galicia Championships		
M 85 (progression)	6:40.25	Manuel Alonso Domingo	Spain	21 March 1936	85	22 May 2021	Sabadell, Spain	Cto. España Master Combinadas, Pentatlón Lanzamientos, Milla y 10000m		
M 90	7:43.58	Manuel Alonso Domingo	Spain	21 March 1936	90	30 May 2026	Toledo, Spain	Trofeo Corpus 2026		
M 95	11:56.04	Antonio Nacca	Italy	16 December 1923	95	7 April 2019	Novara, Italy	Regional Meeting		
M 100	11:53.45	Fauja Singh	Great Britain	1 April 1911 (Note: questionable birth date)	100	13 October 2011	Toronto, Canada	OMA Fauja Singh Invitational Meet		

=== 3000 metres ===
Age group	Record	Athlete	Nationality	Birthdate	Age	Date	Place	Meet	Ref.	Video
M 35	7:29.00	Bernard Lagat	United States	12 December 1974	35	29 August 2010	Rieti, Italy	Rieti Meeting		
M 40 (progression)	7:42.75	Bernard Lagat	United States	12 December 1974	40	14 July 2015	Luzern, Switzerland	Spitzen Meeting		
M 40 (progression)	7:37.92i	Bernard Lagat	United States	12 December 1974	40	25 February 2015	Metz, France	France national meet indoor		
M 45 (progression)	8:15.58	Vyacheslav Shabunin	Russia	27 September 1969	45	15 July 2015	Moscow, Russia	Memorial Kuts		
M 50 (progression)	8:37.94	Antoni Bernadó	Andorra	9 December 1966	51	14 July 2018	Granollers, Spain	Espana Championships Federaciones Autonómicas		
M 50 (progression)	8:36.23 i	Francis Kipkoech Bowen	Kenya	12 October 1973	51	25 March 2025	Gainesville, United States	World Masters Championships indoor		
M 55 (progression)	8:55.93	Peter van der Velden	Netherlands	29 November 1968	55	27 July 2024	Leuven, Belgium	Meeting voor Mon		
M 55 (progression)	8:47.71i	Shane Healy	Ireland	5 October 1968	55	6 January 2024	Abbotstown, Ireland	National Indoor League R1		
M 60 (progression)	9:21.38	Yoshitsugu Iwanaga	Japan	19 July 1960	60	26 September 2020	Saga, Japan	Saga Long Distance Meet		
M 65 (progression)	9:47.4	Derek Turnbull	New Zealand	5 December 1926	65	8 February 1992	Christchurch, New Zealand			
M 70 (progression)	10:36.54	Lucien Heyde	Belgium	11 April 1956	70	7 August 2026	Gentbrugge, Belgium	Vakantie Meeting		
M 75 (progression)	10:58.7 h	Cees Stolwijk	Netherlands	10 January 1950	75	28 August 2025	Breda, Netherlands	Ad Oomen Classic		
M 80 (progression)	11:56.25+	José Vicente Rioseco López	Spain	30 April 1941	80	4 September 2021	Pontevedra, Spain	Galicia Control de marcas		
M 85 (progression)	14:09.66	Jean-Louis Esnault	France	19 January 1940	85	9 July 2025	Chartres, France	Meeting Régional de Chartres		
M 85 (progression)	13:39.24 i	Jean-Louis Esnault	France	19 January 1940	85	25 March 2025	Gainesville, United States	World Masters Championships indoor		
M 90	16:20.96	David Carr	Australia	15 June 1932	90	23 June 2022	Perth, Australia	ECAC Meet		
M 95	22:46.4	Antonio Nacca	Italy	16 December 1923	95	16 December 2018	Novara, Italy	'Tre miglia d'oro' Meeting		
M 100	22:52.47	Fauja Singh	Great Britain	1 April 1911	100	13 October 2011	Toronto, Canada	OMA Fauja Singh Invitational Meet		

=== 5000 metres ===
Age group	Record	Athlete	Nationality	Birthdate	Age	Date	Place	Meet	Ref.
M 35 (progression)	12:53.60	Bernard Lagat	United States	12 December 1974	36	22 July 2011	Monaco	Herculis	
M 40 (progression)
M 40 (progression)	13:06.78	Bernard Lagat	United States	12 December 1974	41	20 August 2016	Rio de Janeiro, Brazil	Olympic Games	
M 45 (progression)	14:23.6	Lucien Rault	France	30 March 1936	46	19 June 1982	Vannes, France		
M 45 (progression)	14:21.77	Said Boudalia	Italy	4 July 1968	45	29 September 2013	Rieti, Italy	Clubs Championships 'Silver'	
M 45 (progression)	14:11.09	Kevin Castille	United States	17 March 1972	45	9 June 2017	Nashville, United States	Music Distance Festival	
M 50 (progression)
M 50 (progression)	14:51.38	Francis Kipkoech Bowen	Kenya	12 October 1973	50	14 August 2024	Gothenburg, Sweden	World Masters Championships	
M 55 (progression)	15:29.7	Keith Bateman	Australia	29 June 1955	55	5 January 2011	Sydney, Australia	ANSW Permit meet	
M 60 (progression)	15:52.9 h	Stephen Moneghetti	Australia	26 September 1962	60	1 December 2022	Clifton Hill, Australia	Collingwood Classic	
M 65 (progression)	16:36.59	Alastair Walker	Great Britain	25 May 1956	66	13 August 2022	Tullamore, Ireland	Irish Masters Championships	
M 70 (progression)	18:15.53	Ron Robertson	New Zealand	3 June 1941	70	9 July 2011	Sacramento, United States	World Masters Championships	
M 70 (progression)	18:09.41	Eddy Vierendeels	Belgium	7 November 1952	71	23 June 2024	Beveren, Belgium	Belgian Masters Championships	
M 75 (progression)	18:50.07	Cees Stolwijk	Netherlands	10 January 1950	75	21 September 2025	Breda, Netherlands	Masters club competition final	
M 80 (progression)	20:20.01	José Vicente Rioseco López	Spain	30 April 1941	80	4 September 2021	Pontevedra, Spain	Galicia Control de marcas	
M 85 (progression)	23:51.51	Fokke Kramer	Germany	13 April 1938	85	9 July 2023	Kiel, Germany	Regional Masters Championships SHLV/HLV/LVMV	
M 90 (progression)	29:28.60	David Carr	Australia	15 June 1932	90	13 October 2022	Perth, Australia	ECAC Meet	
M 95	39:42.52	Antonio Nacca	Italy	16 December 1923	95	4 May 2019	Novara, Italy	Trofeo Dellomodarme	
M 100	49:57.39	Fauja Singh	Great Britain	1 April 1911	100	13 October 2011	Toronto, Canada	OMA Fauja Singh Invitational Meet	

=== 10000 metres ===
Age group	Record	Athlete	Nationality	Birthdate	Age	Date	Place	Meet	Ref.
M 35 (progression)	26:51.20	Haile Gebrselassie	Ethiopia	18 April 1973	35	24 May 2008	Hengelo, Netherlands	Fanny Blankers-Koen Games	
M 40 (progression)	27:49.35	Bernard Lagat	United States	12 December 1974	41	1 May 2016	Stanford, United States	Payton Jordan Invitational	
M 45 (progression)	29:39.43	Mustafa Mohamed	Sweden	1 March 1979	45	27 July 2024	Uddevalla, Sweden	KP Games	
M 50 (progression)	30:48.87	Sean Wade	United States	2 February 1966	50	1 April 2016	San Francisco, United States	San Francisco State Distance Carnival	
M 55 (progression)	31:51.86	Keith Bateman	Australia	29 June 1955	55	26 March 2011	Sydney, Australia	NSW Championships	
M 60 (progression)	33:32.09	John Meagher	Australia	13 September 1963	60	28 July 2024	Melbourne, Australia	Team Challenge Invitation	
M 65 (progression)	34:42.2	Derek Turnbull	New Zealand	5 December 1926	65	15 March 1992	Christchurch, New Zealand	NZL Masters Championships	
M 70 (progression)	38:04.13	Ed Whitlock	Canada	6 March 1931	70	9 July 2001	Brisbane, Australia	WAVA Championships	
M 70 (progression)	37:39.85	Eddy Vierendeels	Belgium	7 November 1952	70	30 September 2023	Frasnes-lez-Anvaing, Belgium	Championat Provincial 10000m	
M 70 (progression)	36:55.60	Eddy Vierendeels	Belgium	7 November 1952	70	8 May 2024	Leuven, Belgium	Belgian Masters Championships 10000m	
M 75 (progression)	39:08.28	Cees Stolwijk	Netherlands	10 January 1950	75	25 September 2025	Hengelo, Netherlands	Trackmeeting LAAC	
M 80 (progression)	42:39.95	Ed Whitlock	Canada	6 March 1931	80	11 July 2011	Sacramento, United States	World Masters Athletics Championships	
M 85 (progression)	51:07.53	Ed Whitlock	Canada	6 March 1931	86	12 August 2016	Toronto, Canada	Canadian Masters Championship	
M 90 (progression)	1:02:48.93	David Carr	Australia	15 June 1932	90	11 August 2022	Cannington, Australia	ECAC Meet	
M 90 (progression)	1:02:21.5	Alfred Althaus	Germany	17 November 1903	90	3 June 1994	Athens, Greece	European Masters Athletics Championships	

=== Marathon ===
Age group	Record	Athlete	Nationality	Birthdate	Age	Date	Place	Meet	Ref.
M 35 (progression)	2:01:09	Eliud Kipchoge	Kenya	5 November 1984	37	25 September 2022	Berlin, Germany	Berlin Marathon	
M 40 (progression)	2:04:19	Kenenisa Bekele	Ethiopia	13 June 1982	41	3 December 2023	Valencia, Spain	Valencia Marathon	
M 40 (progression)	2:04:15	Kenenisa Bekele	Ethiopia	13 June 1982	41	21 April 2024	London, United Kingdom	London Marathon	
M 45 (progression)	2:14:23	Bernard Lagat	United States	12 December 1974	45	29 February 2020	Atlanta, United States	United States Olympic Trials	
M 45 (progression)	2:09:12	Mark Kiptoo	Kenya	21 June 1976	46	23 April 2023	Zurich, Switzerland	Zürich Marathon	
M 45 (progression)	2:09:10	Mark Kiptoo	Kenya	21 June 1976	47	17 March 2024	Seoul, South Korea	Seoul International Marathon	
M 45 (progression)	2:11:15	Mark Kiptoo	Kenya	21 June 1976	45	24 April 2022	Madrid, Spain	Rock 'n' Roll Madrid Marathon	
M 45 (progression)	2:12:47	Kenneth Mungara	Kenya	7 September 1973	45	18 February 2019	Hong Kong	Hong Kong Marathon	
M 45 (progression)	2:14:16	Jackson Kipngok	Kenya	14 December 1960	45	5 March 2006	Torreón, Mexico	Lala Marathon	
M 50 (progression)	2:19:29	Titus Mamabolo	South Africa	11 January 1941	50	20 July 1991	Durban, South Africa	WAVA Championships	
M 50 (progression)	2:15:24	Mark Kiptoo	Kenya	21 June 1976	50	25 October 2026	Frankfurt, Germany	Frankfurt Marathon	
M 55 (progression)	2:25:56	Piet van Alphen	Netherlands	16 August 1930	55	19 April 1986	Rotterdam, Netherlands	Rotterdam Marathon	
M 55 (progression)	2:24:05	Aleksandr Rogoten	Russia	22 September 1969	55	29 September 2024	Berlin, Germany	Berlin Marathon	
M 60 (progression)	2:30:02	Tommy Hughes	Ireland	8 January 1960	60	25 October 2020	Lisburn, Ireland	Lisburn Festival of Running Marathon	
M 60 (progression)	2:28:28	Mohammed El Yamani	France	4 September 1964	61	15 February 2026	Seville, Spain	Seville Marathon	
M 65 (progression)	2:41:57	Derek Turnbull	New Zealand	5 December 1926	65	12 April 1992	London, United Kingdom	London Marathon	
M 70 (progression)	2:54:18	Shin Haeng-cheol	South Korea	1955	70	15 March 2026	Seoul, South Korea	Seoul International Marathon	
M 75 (progression)	3:04:54	Ed Whitlock	Canada	6 March 1931	76	15 April 2007	Rotterdam, Netherlands	Rotterdam Marathon	
M 80 (progression)	3:15:54	Ed Whitlock	Canada	6 March 1931	80	16 October 2011	Toronto, Canada	Toronto Waterfront Marathon	
M 85 (progression)	3:56:38	Ed Whitlock	Canada	6 March 1931	85	16 October 2016	Toronto, Canada	Toronto Waterfront Marathon	
M 90	4:35:14 (4:30.31c)	Giuseppe Damato	Italy	9 January 1936	90	12 April 2026	Milan, Italy	Milano Marathon	
M 100	8:25:17	Fauja Singh	Great Britain	1 April 1911	100	16 October 2011	Toronto, Canada	Toronto Waterfront Marathon	

=== 80 metres hurdles ===
Age group	Record	Athlete	Nationality	Birthdate	Age	Date	Place	Meet	Ref.
M 70 30" (progression)	12.58 (−1.0 m/s)	Ward Hazen	Canada	28 July 1954	71	10 August 2025	Charlottesville, United States	USATF Masters Championships Combined Events	
M 75 30" (progression)	13.62	James Stookey	United States	20 January 1930	75	4 September 2005	McLean, United States	Potomac Valley Games	
M 80 27" (progression)	14.75 (+0.1 m/s)	Melvin Larsen	United States	12 June 1924	81	31 August 2005	San Sebastián, Spain	World Masters Championships	
M 85 27" (progression)	17.33 (−0.1 m/s)	Anthony Bowman	Great Britain	2 September 1935	85	8 June 2021	Stretford, United Kingdom	Trafford Sprints Grand Prix	
M 90 27" (progression)	21.62 (−1.2 m/s)	Ralph Maxwell	United States	26 November 1919	91	7 July 2011	Sacramento, United States	World Masters Championships	

=== 100 metres hurdles ===
Age group	Record	Athlete	Nationality	Birthdate	Age	Date	Place	Meet	Ref.	Video
M 50 36" (progression)	13.49 (+1.3 m/s)	Joe Appiah	Great Britain	26 October 1970	51	11 June 2022	London, United Kingdom	London Schools Championships		
M 55 36" (progression)	13.75 (+1.2 m/s)	Joe Appiah	Great Britain	26 October 1970	55	9 August 2026	Stratford, United Kingdom	Stratford Speed GP4		
M 60 33" (progression)	14.37 (+0.4 m/s)	Thaddeus Wilson	United States	22 December 1950	60	29 July 2011	Berea, United States	USA Masters Championships		
M 65 33" (progression)	15.08 (+1.0 m/s)	Peter Grimes	United States	10 February 1959	65	19 July 2024	Sacramento, United States	USA Masters Championships		

=== 110 metres hurdles ===
Age group	Record	Athlete	Nationality	Birthdate	Age	Date	Place	Meet	Ref.
M 35 39" (progression)	12.96 (42") (+0.4 m/s)	Allen Johnson	United States	1 March 1971	35	17 September 2006	Athens, Greece	IAAF World Cup	
M 40 39" (progression)	13.73 (−0.5 m/s)	David Ashford	United States	24 January 1963	40	11 July 2003	Carolina, Puerto Rico	World Masters Athletics Championships	
M 45 39" (progression)	14.26 (+0.3 m/s)	Jan Schindzielorz	Germany	8 August 1978	45	13 August 2023	Mönchengladbach, Germany	Germany Masters Championships	

=== 200 metres hurdles ===
Age group	Record	Athlete	Nationality	Birthdate	Age	Date	Place	Meet	Ref.
M 80	36.06 (+1.4 m/s)	John MacDermott	Ireland	12 March 1944	80	17 August 2024	Gothenburg, Sweden	World Masters Championships	
M 85
M 85	42.70 (+0.4 m/s)	Earl Fee	Canada	22 March 1929	85	23 August 2014	San José, Costa Rica	NCCWMA Championships	
M 90	51.31 A	Ralph Maxwell	United States	26 November 1919	90	23 July 2010	Fort Collins, United States	Rocky Mountain Master Games	

=== 300 metres hurdles ===
Age group	Record	Athlete	Nationality	Birthdate	Age	Date	Place	Meet	Ref.
M 60 (progression)	42.31	Guido Müller	Germany	22 December 1938	60	1 August 1999	Gateshead, United Kingdom	World Masters Athletics Championships	
M 65 (progression)	43.88	Guido Müller	Germany	22 December 1938	65	25 July 2004	Aarhus, Denmark	European Masters Athletics Championships	
M 70 (progression)	45.24	Guido Müller	Germany	22 December 1938	70	10 July 2009	Vaterstetten, Germany	Germany Masters Athletics Championships	
M 75 (progression)	49.65	Guido Müller	Germany	22 December 1938	75	12 July 2014	Erfurt, Germany	Germany Masters Athletics Championships	
event defunct, age group now doing 200 m officially
M 80
M 80	56.92	Earl Fee	Canada	22 March 1929	80	11 October 2009	Sydney, Australia	World Masters Games	
M 80	62.61	Dan Bulkley	United States	4 May 1917	82	1 August 1999	Gateshead, United Kingdom	WAVA Championships	
M 85	67.99	Hugo Delgado Flores	Peru	9 June 1924	85	2 August 2009	Lahti, Finland	World Masters Athletics Championships	
M 90	2:01.71	Ilmari Koppinen	Finland	8 January 1918	90	9 August 2008	Orimattila, Finland	Masters Meet	

=== 400 metres hurdles ===
Age group	Record	Athlete	Nationality	Birthdate	Age	Date	Place	Meet	Ref.	Video
M 35 (progression)	48.13	Danny McFarlane	Jamaica	14 February 1972	37	28 July 2009	Monaco	Herculis		
M 35 (progression)	48.10	Félix Sánchez	Dominican Republic	30 August 1977	35	13 August 2013	Moscow, Russia	World Championships		
M 40 (progression)	49.69	Danny McFarlane	Jamaica	14 February 1972	40	29 June 2012	Kingston, Jamaica	Jamaican Olympic Trials		Video on YouTube
M 45 (progression)	53.57	Aramis Diaz	Italy	22 November 1974	45	5 September 2020	Rome, Italy	Meeting 'Caccia al Minimo' 2		
M 50 (progression)	54.91	Ian Weakley	United States	24 February 1974	50	17 August 2024	Gothenburg, Sweden	World Masters Championships		
M 50 (progression)	54.75	Ian Weakley	United States	24 February 1974	50	16 July 2024	Berea, United States	PanAmerican Masters Games		
M 55 (progression)	57.49	Toine van Beckhoven	Netherlands	1 January 1970	56	25 May 2026	Tilburg, Netherlands	Synchroon TMeeting		

=== 2000 metres steeplechase ===
Age group	Record	Athlete	Nationality	Birthdate	Age	Date	Place	Meet	Ref.
M 60	6:30.21	Ron Robertson	New Zealand	3 June 1941	60	14 July 2001	Brisbane, Australia	WAVA Championships	
M 65	7:09.29	Richard Lee	United States	10 March 1961	65	22 August 2026	Daegu, South Korea	World Masters Championships	
M 70	7:10.03	Ron Robertson	New Zealand	3 June 1941	70	17 July 2011	Sacramento, United States	World Masters Championships	
M 75	8:29.26	José Vicente Rioseco López	Spain	30 April 1941	78	28 June 2019	Sagunto, Spain	Spanish Masters Championships	
M 80	9:35.1	David Carr	Australia	15 June 1932	80	1 February 2013	Perth, Australia	Strive Meet	
M 85	10:53.3 h	David Carr	Australia	15 June 1932	85	21 December 2017	Perth, Australia	ECAC Meet	
M 90	12:26.57	David Carr	Australia	15 June 1932	90	15 September 2022	Perth, Australia	ECAC Meet	

=== 3000 metres steeplechase ===
Age group	Record	Athlete	Nationality	Birthdate	Age	Date	Place	Meet	Ref.
M 35	8:04.95	Simon Vroemen	Netherlands	11 May 1969	36	26 August 2005	Brussels, Belgium	Memorial Van Damme	
M 40	8:38.40	Angelo Carosi	Italy	20 January 1964	40	11 July 2004	Florence, Italy	National Championships	
M 45	8:58.65	Max King	United States	24 February 1980	46	18 April 2026	Eugene, United States	Oregon Team Invitational	
M 50	9:38.8	Nils Undersåker	Norway	11 April 1939	50	10 June 1989	Stjørdal, Norway		
M 55	9:55.05	Ron Robertson	New Zealand	3 June 1941	56	27 July 1997	Durban, South Africa	WAVA Championships	

=== High jump ===
progression of masters high jump records

Age group	Record	Athlete	Nationality	Birthdate	Age	Date	Place	Meet	Ref.	Video
M 35 (progression)	2.31	Dragutin Topić	Serbia	12 March 1971	38	28 July 2009	Kragujevac, Serbia	Serbian Senior meet		
M 35 (progression)	2.31	Jamie Nieto	United States	2 November 1976	35	9 June 2012	New York City, United States	Diamond League		
M 40 (progression)	2.28	Dragutin Topić	Serbia	12 March 1971	41	20 May 2012	Belgrade, Serbia	Serbian Clubs Championships		
M 40 (progression)	2.28	Donald Thomas	Bahamas	1 July 1984	40	27 April 2025	Mobile, United States	Jaguar Invitational		
M 45 (progression)	2.05	Charles Austin	United States	19 December 1967	46	21 June 2014	San Marcos, United States	Texas Masters Championships		
M 50 (progression)	1.98	Thomas Zacharias	Germany	2 January 1947	50	17 May 1997	Baunatal, Germany			
M 50 (progression)	2.00 i	Thomas Zacharias	Germany	2 January 1947	50	2 March 1997	Birmingham, United Kingdom	European Masters Championships		
M 55 (progression)
M 55 (progression)	1.91	Marco Segatel	Italy	23 March 1962	55	8 July 2017	Orvieto, Italy	Italian Masters Championships		
M 60 (progression)	1.82	Rüdiger Weber	Germany	19 June 1963	60	16 June 2024	Erding, Germany	German Masters Championships		
M 65 (progression)	1.68	Bruce McBarnette	United States	7 October 1957	65	6 August 2023	Columbia, United States	Maryland Senior Olympics		
M 65 (progression)	1.68	Manfred Ziegler	Germany	19 December 1959	65	31 May 2025	Vohenstrauß, Germany	Kreismeisterschaften U14 open		
M 65 (progression)	1.69 i (Note: Superior indoor marks of 1.70 and 1.73 were achieved by Oleg Fedorko on 22 December 2019 and 9 February 2020 respectively, but those performances were never ratified by WMA.)	Marco Claudio Mastrolorenzi	Italy	27 December 1960	65	7 March 2026	Ancona, Italy	Italian Indoor Masters Championships		
M 70 (progression)	1.60	Dušan Prezelj	Slovenia	25 January 1949	71	22 July 2020	Ptuj, Slovenia	Masters Meet		Video on YouTube
M 75 (progression)	1.49	Carl-Erik Särndal	Sweden	17 July 1937	76	17 September 2013	Lund, Sweden	Sydsvenska Ungdomsspelen		
M 75 (progression)	1.53 i	Dušan Prezelj	Slovenia	25 January 1949	75	2 March 2024	Zagreb, Croatia	Croatian Masters Open Indoor Championships		Video on YouTube
M 80 (progression)	1.38	Carl-Erik Särndal	Sweden	17 July 1937	80	20 August 2017	Karlskrona, Sweden	Swedish Masters Championships		
M 80 (progression)	1.40 i	Carl-Erik Särndal	Sweden	17 July 1937	81	3 March 2019	Malmö, Sweden	Swedish Masters Championships		
M 85 (progression)	1.28	Carl-Erik Särndal	Sweden	17 July 1937	85	24 July 2022	Ystad, Sweden	Ystad Games		
M 90 (progression)	1.12	Brian Greaves	Australia		90	18 April 2025	Adelaide, Australia	Australian Masters Championships		
M 90 (progression)	1.15 A	Donald Pellmann	United States	12 August 1915	90	4 September 2005	Fort Collins, United States	Rocky Mountain Master Games		
M 95 (progression)	1.00	Emmerich Zensch	Austria	20 December 1919	95	14 August 2015	Lyon, France	World Masters Championships		
M 100 (progression)	0.90	Donald Pellmann	United States	12 August 1915	100	20 September 2015	San Diego, United States	San Diego Senior Olympics		Video on YouTube

=== Pole vault ===
Age group	Record	Athlete	Nationality	Birthdate	Age	Date	Place	Meet	Ref.	Video
M 35 (progression)	5.90	Björn Otto	Germany	16 October 1977	35	1 June 2013	Eugene, United States	Prefontaine Classic		
M 35 (progression)	5.91 i	Renaud Lavillenie	France	18 September 1986	38	28 February 2025	Clermont-Ferrand, France	All Star Perche		
M 40 (progression)	5.70	Jeff Hartwig	United States	25 September 1967	40	29 June 2008	Eugene, United States	United States Olympic Trials		
M 40 (progression)	5.71 i	Jeff Hartwig	United States	25 September 1967	40	31 May 2008	Jonesboro, United States	Vaultstock		
M 45 (progression)	5.25	Oscar Janson	Sweden	22 July 1975	47	13 August 2022	Mölndal, Sweden	Sky Is The Limit		
M 50 (progression)	4.75	Gary Hunter	United States	26 February 1956	51	4 August 2007	Orono, United States	USATF Masters Championships		
M 50 (progression)	4.90 i	Jonas Asplund	Sweden	14 February 1973	53	31 March 2026	Toruń, Poland	European Masters indoor Championships		
M 55 (progression)	4.60	Wolfgang Ritte	Germany	7 January 1953	55	8 June 2008	Voerde, Germany	Pole vault meet		
M 60 (progression)	4.32	Wolfgang Ritte	Germany	7 January 1953	60	19 May 2013	Wipperfürth, Germany	Pole vault meet		
M 65 (progression)	4.05	Wolfgang Ritte	Germany	7 January 1953	65	19 May 2018	Wipperfürth, Germany	Pole vault meet		
M 70 (progression)	3.53	Wolfgang Ritte	Germany	7 January 1953	70	25 September 2023	Pescara, Italy	European Masters Championships		
M 70 (progression)	3.56 i	Wolfgang Ritte	Germany	7 January 1953	70	31 March 2023	Toruń, Poland	World Masters Championships		
M 75 (progression)	3.20	Don Isett	United States	16 May 1939	75	31 May 2014	Dallas, United States	USATF Southwestern Association Championships		
M 75 (progression)	3.23	Don Isett	United States	16 May 1939	75	7 June 2014	Belton, United States	Summer fun		
M 80 (progression)	2.75	Bud Held	United States	25 October 1927	80	4 October 2008	Santa Barbara, United States	Club West Masters Meet		
M 80 (progression)	2.80 i (Note: Competition at USATF Masters Outdoor Championships moved indoors)	Arthur Parry	United States	4 April 1946	80	19 July 2026	Geneva, United States	USATF Masters Championships		
M 85 (progression)	2.28	Frank Dickey	United States	7 January 1932	85	9 April 2017	San Antonio, United States	Texas Senior Games		
M 85 (progression)	2.44 i	William Bell	United States	19 March 1922	85	23 March 2007	Boston, United States	USATF National Indoor Masters Championships		
M 90 (progression)	2.05	William Bell	United States	19 March 1922	91	12 July 2013	Olathe, United States	USATF National Masters Championships		
M 95	1.35	William Bell	United States	19 March 1922	95	15 July 2017	Baton Rouge, United States	USATF National Masters Championships		

=== Long jump ===
Age group	Record	Athlete	Nationality	Birthdate	Age	Date	Place	Meet	Ref.	Video
M 35 (progression)	8.50 (+1.9 m/s)	Larry Myricks	United States	10 March 1956	35	15 June 1991	New York City, United States	New York Games		
M 35 (progression)	8.50 (−1.3 m/s)	Carl Lewis	United States	1 July 1961	35	29 July 1996	Atlanta, United States	Olympic Games		@ 1:57:15
M 40 (progression)	7.68 (+1.5 m/s) A	Aaron Sampson	United States	20 September 1961	40	21 June 2002	Cedar City, United States	Utah Summer Games		
M 40 (progression)	7.77 (+1.8 m/s)	Kafetien Gomis	France	23 March 1980	41	5 June 2021	Pierre-Bénite, France	Meeting National Envol		
M 45 (progression)	7.27 (+1.2 m/s)	Tapani Taavitsainen	Finland	17 June 1944	46	21 August 1990	Bern, Switzerland			
M 50 (progression)	6.84 (+1.7 m/s)	Tapani Taavitsainen	Finland	17 June 1944	50	18 June 1994	Geneve, Switzerland			
M 55 (progression)	6.50 (±0.0 m/s)	Gianni Becatti	Italy	27 August 1963	55	9 September 2018	Málaga, Spain	World Masters Championships		
M 60 (progression)	6.18 (+2.0 m/s)	Gianni Becatti	Italy	27 August 1963	61	7 September 2024	Pietrasanta, Italy	Meeting Città di Pietrasanta		
M 65 (progression)	5.54 (+0.5 m/s)	Stanislaw Chmielewski	Poland	2 July 1959	66	5 July 2025	Gorzów, Poland	Poland Masters Championships		
M 70 (progression)	5.19 (−0.8 m/s)	Melvin Larsen	United States	12 June 1924	70	12 August 1994	Eugene, United States	USATF Masters Championships		
M 70 (progression)	5.22 i	Vladimir Popov	Russia	3 July 1932	71	20 March 2004	Moscow, Russia	Russia Masters Championships indoor		
M 75 (progression)	4.83 (+0.8 m/s)	Saburo Ishigami	Japan	15 August 1930	75	25 August 2005	Osaka, Japan	Japan Masters Championships		
M 80 (progression)	4.45 (+0.3 m/s)	Eberhard Linke	Germany	3 January 1944	80	30 May 2024	Kreuztal, Germany	FLVW Team Finale Senior/Seniorinnen		
M 85 (progression)	3.83 (+1.1 m/s)	Mamoru Saito	Japan	October 1936	85	11 September 2022	Maebashi, Japan	38° Gunma Masters Championships		
M 90 (progression)	3.26 A	Donald Pellmann	United States	12 August 1915	90	4 September 2005	Fort Collins, United States	Rocky Mountain Master Games		
M 95	2.31 (+0.1 m/s)	William Platts	United States	18 April 1928	95	9 October 2023	St.George, United States	Huntsman World Senior Games		
M 100	1.78 (±0.0 m/s)	Donald Pellmann	United States	12 August 1915	100	20 September 2015	San Diego, United States	San Diego Senior Olympics		

=== Triple jump ===
progression of masters triple jump records

Age group	Record	Athlete	Nationality	Birthdate	Age	Date	Place	Meet	Ref.
M 35 (progression)	17.92 (+0.7 m/s)	Jonathan Edwards	Great Britain	10 May 1966	35	6 August 2001	Edmonton, Canada	World Championships	
M 40 (progression)	16.93 (−0.3 m/s)	Fabrizio Donato	Italy	14 August 1976	40	6 September 2016	Rovereto, Italy	Palio della Quercia	
M 40 (progression)	17.13 i	Fabrizio Donato	Italy	14 August 1976	40	5 March 2017	Belgrade, Serbia	European Championships	
M 40 (progression)	17.32 (+1.1 m/s)	Fabrizio Donato	Italy	14 August 1976	40	9 June 2017	Pierre-Bénite, France	Jumps Meet	
M 45 (progression)	15.34 (+1.2 m/s)	Tosin Oke	Nigeria	1 October 1980	45	4 July 2026	Bedford, United Kingdom	England Athletics U20 and Senior Track and Field and Combined Events	
M 50 (progression)	14.44 (±0.0 m/s)	Wolfgang Knabe	Germany	12 July 1959	50	18 July 2009	Lübeck, Germany	Norddeutsche Meisterschaften	
M 55 (progression)	14.13 (+0.7 m/s)	Wolfgang Knabe	Germany	12 July 1959	55	28 August 2014	İzmir, Turkey	European Masters Championships	
M 60 (progression)	12.82 (+0.2 m/s)	Wolfgang Knabe	Germany	12 July 1959	61	10 July 2021	Garbsen, Germany	NLV Jumps Cup	
M 65 (progression)	12.16 (+1.1 m/s)	Wolfgang Knabe	Germany	12 July 1959	66	23 August 2025	Gotha, Germany	German Masters Championships	
M 70 (progression)	10.77 (+1.0 m/s)	Arne Tefre	Norway	3 June 1955	70	19 October 2025	Madeira, Portugal	European Masters Championships	
M 70 (progression)	10.88 i	Pertti Ahomäki	Finland	26 February 1946	70	2 April 2016	Ancona, Italy	European Masters Championships indoor	
M 70 (progression)	10.90 (+1.0 m/s)	Adam Adamec	Poland	22 May 1947	70	9 September 2017	Zielona Góra, Poland	Wine's Meeting Masters	
M 75 (progression)	10.12 (+1.6 m/s)	Olle Borg	Sweden	1 October 1947	76	12 September 2024	Arvika, Sweden	Klubbtävling veteraner	
M 80 (progression)	9.29 (−0.1 m/s)	Eberhard Linke	Germany	3 January 1944	80	15 June 2024	Erding, Germany	German Masters Championships	
M 85 (progression)	8.17 (+0.7 m/s)	Aatos Saino	Finland	7 June 1925	85	4 July 2010	Tampere, Finland	Finland Masters Championships	
M 90 (progression)	7.10 (+0.6 m/s)	Aatos Saino	Finland	7 June 1925	90	22 July 2015	Kangasala, Finland	Bruunon Games	
M 90 (progression)	7.24 (−0.3 m/s)	Yoshiyuki Shimizu	Brazil	14 July 1928	91	3 November 2019	Porto Alegre, Brazil	Trofeu Brasil de Atletismo Masters	
M 90 (progression)	7.23 (+0.1 m/s)	Yoshiyuki Shimizu	Brazil	14 July 1928	90	18 November 2018	São Bernardo do Campo, Brazil	National Masters Championships	
M 95	5.23 (+1.1 m/s)	Emmerich Zensch	Austria	20 December 1919	95	9 August 2015	Lyon, France	World Masters Championships	
M 95	5.31 i	Emmerich Zensch	Austria	20 December 1919	95	27 March 2015	Toruń, Poland	European Masters Championships indoor	
M 100	3.52 (+1.7 m/s)	Giuseppe Ottaviani	Italy	20 May 1916	100	8 July 2016	Arezzo, Italy	Italian Masters Championships	
M 100	3.54 (+0.3 m/s)	Giuseppe Ottaviani	Italy	20 May 1916	100	30 May 2016	Urbino, Italy	Masters Meet	

=== Shot put ===
Age group	Record	Athlete	Nationality	Birthdate	Age	Date	Place	Meet	Ref.	Video
M 35 (progression)	22.58	Joe Kovacs	United States	28 June 1989	36	31 May 2026	Rabat, Morocco	Meeting International Mohammed VI d'Athlétisme de Rabat		Video on YouTube
M 35 (progression)	22.67	Kevin Toth	United States	29 December 1967	35	19 April 2003	Lawrence, United States	Kansas Relay		
M 40 (progression)	21.41	Brian Oldfield	United States	1 June 1945	40	22 August 1985	Innsbruck, Austria	Alpenrosen		
M 45 (progression)	20.77	Ivan Ivančić	Yugoslavia	6 December 1937	45	31 August 1983	Koblenz, Germany	Rot Weiss Meet		
M 50 (progression)	18.90	Andy Dittmar	Germany	5 July 1974	51	20 September 2025	Ohrdruf, Germany	Herbstsportfest		
M 55 (progression)	17.38	Klaus Liedtke	Germany	5 January 1941	55	22 June 1996	Gelsenkirchen, Germany			
M 60 (progression)	18.37	Klaus Liedtke	Germany	5 January 1941	60	23 June 2001	Cologne, Germany			
M 65 (progression)	16.66	Quenton Torbert	United States	2 December 1951	65	30 April 2017	Eugene, United States	Hayward Classic		
M 70 (progression)	16.33	Quenton Torbert	United States	2 December 1951	70	7 May 2022	Eugene, United States	Hayward Classic		
M 75 (progression)	14.24	Karl-Heinz Marg	Germany	20 May 1938	75	12 July 2013	Mönchengladbach, Germany	Germany Masters Championships		
M 75 (progression)	14.48 i	Karl-Heinz Marg	Germany	20 May 1938	75	26 March 2014	Budapest, Hungary	European Indoor Athletics Masters Championships		
M 80 (progression)	13.98	Leo Saarinen	Finland	27 June 1929	80	15 August 2009	Kangasala, Finland	Finland Masters Championships		
M 85 (progression)	12.38	Roland Heiler	Germany	20 December 1938	85	14 June 2024	Erding, Germany	German Masters Championships		
M 85 (progression)	12.50 i	Östen Edlund	Sweden	26 November 1934	85	11 January 2020	Sätra, Sweden	IVDM		
M 90 (progression)	10.49	Östen Edlund	Sweden	26 November 1934	90	13 June 2025	Tingstäde, Sweden	Throws Pentathlon		
M 95	8.21	Donald Pellmann	United States	12 August 1915	95	27 March 2011	Palo Alto, United States	Bay Area Senior Games		
M 100	6.56	Donald Pellmann	United States	12 August 1915	100	20 September 2015	San Diego, United States	San Diego Senior Olympics		Video on YouTube
M 105	3.25	Hidekichi Miyazaki	Japan	22 September 1910	105	23 September 2015	Kyoto, Japan	Kyoto Masters Autumn Meet		
M 105	4.29	Sawang Janpram	Thailand	8 May 1920	105	22 May 2025	Taipei, Taiwan	World Masters Games		
M 105	4.27	Stanisław Kowalski	Poland	10 April 1910	105	28 June 2015	Toruń, Poland	Poland Masters Championships		

=== Discus throw ===
Age group	Record	Athlete	Nationality	Birthdate	Age	Date	Place	Meet	Ref.	Video
M 35 (progression)	71.56	Virgilijus Alekna	Lithuania	13 February 1972	35	25 July 2007	Kaunas, Lithuania	Kaunas Permit Meeting		
M 40 (progression)	70.28	Virgilijus Alekna	Lithuania	13 February 1972	40	23 June 2012	Klaipėda, Lithuania	Klaipėda Championships		
M 45 (progression)	66.12	Al Oerter	United States	19 September 1936	45	28 March 1982	Westfield, United States			
M 45 (progression)	67.90	Al Oerter	United States	19 September 1936	46	12 November 1982	Long Branch, United States			
M 50 (progression)	68.40	Klaus Weiffenbach	Germany	21 January 1945	52	10 May 1997	Medelby, Germany			
M 55 (progression)	64.58	Klaus Liedtke	Germany	5 January 1941	59	8 October 2000	Medelby, Germany			
M 60 (progression)	66.36	Klaus Liedtke	Germany	5 January 1941	60	19 May 2001	Schwerte-Ergste, Germany			
M 65 (progression)	59.75	Klaus Liedtke	Germany	5 January 1941	66	17 August 2007	Oer-Erkenschwick, Germany			
M 70 (progression)	55.27	Carmelo Rado	Italy	4 August 1933	74	30 September 2007	Chiuro, Italy	Regional Masters Championships		
M 75 (progression)	49.21	Carmelo Rado	Italy	4 August 1933	75	5 October 2008	Besana in Brianza, Italy	Regional Masters Championships		
M 80 (progression)	41.13	Östen Edlund	Sweden	26 November 1934	81	21 June 2016	Tingstäde, Sweden	Throws Pentathlon Meet		
M 85 (progression)	35.92	Carmelo Rado	Italy	4 August 1933	86	13 September 2019	Caorle, Italy	European Masters Championships		
M 90 (progression)	28.49	Ian Reed	United States	10 July 1927	90	16 September 2017	San Diego, United States	San Diego Senior Olympics		
M 95	20.35 (Note: record set during Throws Pentathlon competition)	William Platts	United States	18 April 1928	95	6 October 2023	Las Vegas, United States	Nevada Senior Games		
M 100	14.86	Donald Pellmann	United States	12 August 1915	100	20 September 2015	San Diego, United States	San Diego Senior Olympics		Video on YouTube
M 105	7.59	Sawang Janpram	Thailand	8 May 1920	106	27 August 2026	Daegu, South Korea	World Masters Championships		
M 105	8.61	Sawang Janpram	Thailand	8 May 1920	105	21 May 2025	Taipei, Taiwan	World Masters Games		

=== Hammer throw ===
Age group	Record	Athlete	Nationality	Birthdate	Age	Date	Place	Meet	Ref.
M 35 (progression)	83.62	Igor Astapkovich	Belarus	4 January 1963	35	20 June 1998	Minsk, Belarus	Memorial Klim	
M 40 (progression)	82.23	Igor Astapkovich	Belarus	4 January 1963	41	10 July 2004	Minsk, Belarus		
M 45 (progression)	79.42	Aleksandr Dryhol	Ukraine	25 April 1966	46	29 April 2012	Jablonec nad Nisou, Czech Republic	Throws Meet	
M 50 (progression)	73.70	Aleksandr Dryhol	Israel	25 April 1966	52	8 July 2018	Dnipro, Ukraine	National Masters Championships	
M 50 (progression)	77.35	Aleksandr Dryhol	Israel	25 April 1966	53	6 July 2019	Dnipro, Ukraine	Ukrainian Summer Games	
M 55 (progression)	67.27	Jud Logan	United States	19 July 1959	55	21 September 2014	Ashland, United States	Ashland Summer Series	
M 60 (progression)	63.32	Arild Busterud	Norway	26 January 1948	60	28 July 2008	Ljubljana, Slovenia	European Masters Championships	
M 65 (progression)	60.65	Arild Busterud	Norway	26 January 1948	65	23 July 2013	Tønsberg, Norway	Throws Meet	
M 70 (progression)	59.04	Ed Burke	United States	4 March 1940	70	7 August 2010	Lisle, United States	USATF Masters Throws Pentathlon Championships	
M 75 (progression)	51.88	Jerzy Jabłoński	Poland	23 April 1945	77	28 March 2023	Toruń, Poland	World Masters Championships	
M 75 (progression)	52.22 (Note: record set during Throws Pentathlon competition)	Arild Busterud	Norway	26 January 1948	75	29 April 2023	Tønsberg, Norway	Throws Pentathlon	
M 80 (progression)	50.96	Heimo Viertbauer	Austria	6 November 1943	80	29 September 2024	Moosach, Germany	Moosach Throws series	
M 85 (progression)	43.17	Walter Krifka	Austria	16 December 1936	85	18 June 2022	Linz, Austria	Voest Weight Pentathlon	
M 90 (progression)	28.97	Lothar Huchthausen	Germany	13 March 1935	90	17 October 2025	Madeira, Portugal	European Masters Championships	
M 95	22.01	Antonio Fonseca	Brazil	18 October 1914	96	13 July 2011	Sacramento, United States	World Masters Championships	
M 100	11.32	Trent Lane	United States	28 March 1910	101	21 June 2011	Humble, United States	National Senior Games	

=== Javelin throw ===
Age group	Record	Athlete	Nationality	Birthdate	Age	Date	Place	Meet	Ref.
M 35 (progression)	92.80	Jan Železný	Czech Republic	16 June 1966	35	12 August 2001	Edmonton, Canada	World Championships	
M 40 (progression)	85.92	Jan Železný	Czech Republic	16 June 1966	40	9 August 2006	Gothenburg, Sweden	European Championships	
M 45 (progression)	77.15	Peter Blank	Germany	10 April 1962	45	28 May 2007	Rehlingen, Germany	Pfingst Sportfest	
M 50 (progression)	62.13	Stellan Back	Sweden	19 May 1975	51	31 May 2026	Huddinge, Sweden	Huddingespelen	
M 50 (progression)	76.16 (old design)	Roald Bradstock	Great Britain	24 April 1962	50	2 June 2012	Clermont, United States	NTC Last Chance Meet	
M 55 (progression)	50.39	Mark Jeffery	Australia	1970	56	2 September 2026	Daegu, South Korea	World Masters Championships	
M 55 (progression)	66.76 (old design)	Roald Bradstock	Great Britain	24 April 1962	55	13 May 2017	Clermont, Florida, United States	NTC Sprint Elite Meet	
M 60 (progression)
M 60 (progression)	62.47	Esa Kiuru	Finland	14 April 1947	60	21 July 2007	Koria (Elimäki), Finland	Masters Meet	
M 60 (progression)	62.56	Larry Stuart	United States	19 October 1937	61	12 June 1999	Los Angeles; Eagle Rock, United States	Southern California; USATF Masters Championships	
M 65 (progression)	58.58	Esa Kiuru	Finland	14 April 1947	65	27 May 2012	Helsinki, Finland		
M 70 (progression)	54.47	Esa Kiuru	Finland	14 April 1947	74	10 July 2021	Orivesi, Finland	Orivesi Games	
M 75 (progression)	52.15	Esa Kiuru	Finland	14 April 1947	75	20 August 2022	Vilppula (Mänttä-Vilppula), Finland	Masters Throws Meet	
M 80 (progression)	45.85	Jouni Tenhu	Finland	30 April 1939	80	9 September 2019	Caorle, Italy	European Masters Championships	
M 85 (progression)	40.09	Jouni Tenhu	Finland	30 April 1939	85	19 August 2024	Gothenburg, Sweden	World Masters Championships	
M 85 (progression)	41.36	Jouni Tenhu	Finland	30 April 1939	85	21 July 2024	Tallinn, Estonia	Estonia-Finland Masters Throws Match	
M 90 (progression)	31.46	William Platts	United States	18 April 1928	90	27 July 2018	Spokane, United States	USATF Masters Championships	
M 95	25.26	William Platts	United States	18 April 1928	95	7 May 2023	Eugene, United States	38th Hayward Classic	
M100	12.42	Takashi Shimokawara	Japan	25 July 1906	101	26 October 2007	Yamaguchi, Japan	Japan Masters Championships	
M100	12.75	Takashi Shimokawara	Japan	25 July 1906	101	26 June 2008	Iwate, Japan		
M105	10.04	Sawang Janpram	Thailand	8 May 1920	106	29 August 2026	Daegu, South Korea	World Masters Championships	
M105	11.25	Sawang Janpram	Thailand	8 May 1920	105	9 November 2025	Chennai, India	Asia Masters Championships	

=== Weight throw ===
Age group	Record	Athlete	Nationality	Birthdate	Age	Date	Place	Meet	Ref.	Video
M 35	25.17	Jüri Tamm	Estonia	5 February 1957	35	11 July 1992	Mäntyharju, Finland			
M 40	21.66	Chris Harmse	South Africa	31 May 1973	43	1 April 2017	Pretoria, South Africa	GNMA Championships		
M 45	20.79	Aleksandr Dryhol	Ukraine	25 April 1966	45	12 September 2011	Lignano Sabbiadoro, Italy	European Masters Games		
M 50	24.24	Jud Logan	United States	19 July 1959	50	17 October 2009	Bowling Green, United States	Falcon Weight meet		
M 50	26.16	Aleksandr Dryhol	Israel	25 April 1966	53	7 July 2019	Dnipro, Ukraine	Ukrainian Summer Games		
M 55	23.03	Mariusz Walczak	Poland	27 February 1971	55	27 March 2026	Toruń, Poland	European Masters Championships indoor		
M 60	24.20	Arild Busterud	Norway	26 January 1948	60	25 July 2008	Ljubljana, Slovenia	European Masters Championships		
M 65	22.10	Arild Busterud	Norway	26 January 1948	67	5 August 2015	Lyon, France	World Masters Championships		
M 70	23.15	Arild Busterud	Norway	26 January 1948	70	11 September 2018	Málaga, Spain	World Masters Championships		
M 75	20.69	Arild Busterud	Norway	26 January 1948	75	29 September 2023	Pescara, Italy	European Masters Championships		
M 75	20.93	Arild Busterud	Norway	26 January 1948	75	25 June 2023	Geithus, Norway	National Masters Championships		
M 75	20.99 i	Arild Busterud	Norway	26 January 1948	75	26 March 2023	Toruń, Poland	World Masters Championships		
M 80	20.01	Jerzy Jabłoński	Poland	23 April 1945	80	24 August 2025	Warsaw, Poland	I Blekitny Miting Rzutowy Masters		
M 85	16.65	Carmelo Rado	Italy	4 August 1933	85	15 September 2018	Ancona, Italy	Regional Throws Pentathlon Championships		
M 85	17.14	Walter Krifka	Austria	16 December 1936	85	2 July 2022	Tampere, Finland	World Masters Championships		
M 90	12.13	Östen Edlund	Sweden	26 November 1934	90	13 June 2025	Tingstäde, Sweden	Throws Pentathlon		
M 95	8.25 (Note: record set during Throws Pentathlon competition)	William Platts	United States	18 April 1928	95	6 October 2023	Las Vegas, United States	Nevada Senior Games		
M 100	5.27	Lauri Helle	Finland	1 May 1925	100	8 June 2025	Salo, Finland	Throws competition		

=== Pentathlon ===
Note: Points are given using the 2023 WMA age factors; old point totals are given in brackets.

Age group	Record	Athlete	Nationality	Birthdate	Age	Date	Place	Meet	Ref.
M 35	3647 (old: 3669)	Franz Mayr	Germany	6 October 1955	35	25 August 1991	Aichach, Germany		
M 35	Long jump (wind) / Javelin / 200m (wind) / Discus / 1500m; 6.57 m / 51.28 m / 23.58 / 39.58 m / 4:25.39								
M 40	3921 (old: 3937)	Mattias Sunneborn	Sweden	27 September 1970	40	15 June 2011	Sätra, Sweden		
M 40	Long jump (wind) / Javelin / 200m (wind) / Discus / 1500m; 7.14 m (+0.9 m/s) / 46.79 m / 22.06 (+2.3 m/s) / 37.52 m / 4:57.73								
M 45	3762 (old: 3820)	Thomas Stewens	Germany	10 September 1966	46	29 September 2012	Nieder-Olm, Germany		
M 45	Long jump (wind) / Javelin / 200m (wind) / Discus / 1500m; 6.13 m (±0.0 m/s) / 45.84 m / 24.84 (+0.8 m/s) / 35.85 m / 4:43.26								
M 50	vacant (Note: No record has yet been ratified for this age group using the new javelin design.)								
M 50	Long jump (wind) / Javelin / 200m (wind) / Discus / 1500m								
M 50	4033 (old javelin design)	Paul Jeffery	Australia	14 January 1974	51	2 March 2025	Perth, Australia	Western Australia State Masters Championships	
M 50	Long jump (wind) / Javelin / 200m (wind) / Discus / 1500m; 5.80 m (−1.0 m/s) / 55.76 m / 24.90 (+0.2 m/s) / 44.86 m / 5:15.92								
M 55	vacant								
M 55	Long jump (wind) / Javelin / 200m (wind) / Discus / 1500m								
M 55	4049 (old: 4102) (old javelin design)	Thomas Stewens	Germany	10 September 1966	55	28–29 May 2022	Stendal, Germany	Stendaler Hanse-Cup	
M 55	Long jump (wind) / Javelin / 200m (wind) / Discus / 1500m; 5.41 m (+0.7 m/s) / 48.04 m / 26.16 (−0.8 m/s) / 39.69 m / 4:58.06								
M 60	4144	Dieter Bartzsch	Germany	12 October 1939	60	18 June 2000	Lage, Germany		
M 60	Long jump (wind) / Javelin / 200m (wind) / Discus / 1500m; 5.42 m (+1.5 m/s) / 48.25 m / 25.38 (+1.3 m/s) / 44.61 m / 5:43.85								
M 65	3853 (old: 4072)	Wim Threels	Netherlands	26 February 1952	68	27 September 2020	Stendal, Germany	Stendaler Hanse-Cup	
M 65	Long jump (wind) / Javelin / 200m (wind) / Discus / 1500m; 5.04 m (−0.2 m/s) / 38.47 m / 27.49 (+0.9 m/s) / 33.37 m / 5:40.12								
M 70	3827 (old: 4165)	Wim Threels	Netherlands	26 February 1952	70	29 May 2022	Stendal, Germany	Stendaler Hanse-Cup	
M 70	Long jump (wind) / Javelin / 200m (wind) / Discus / 1500m; 4.28 m (+0.9 m/s) / 38.96 m / 28.70 (−0.4 m/s) / 32.69 m / 5:43.77								
M 75	3620 (old: 4060)	Sherwood Sagedahl	United States	17 March 1939	75	17 July 2014	Winston-Salem, United States	USATF Masters Championships	
M 75	Long jump (wind) / Javelin / 200m (wind) / Discus / 1500m; 3.72 m (−1.7 m/s) / 32.57 m / 31.12 (−0.7 m/s) / 30.45 m / 6:01.04								
M 80	3444	Basilius Balschalarski	Germany	15 January 1946	80	4 October 2026	Aichach, Germany	South German and Bavarian Masters Combined Events Championships	
M 80	Long jump (wind) / Javelin / 200m (wind) / Discus / 1500m; 3.62 m (+0.5 m/s) / 33.84 m / 34.65 (−0.3 m/s) / 32.01 m / 7:52.39								

=== Decathlon ===
Note: per 1-1-2023 new scorings are in use, scorings from 2010/2014 are given between brackets.

Age group	Record	Athlete	Nationality	Birthdate	Age	Date	Place	Meet	Ref.
M 35	8511* (hs 1.06)	Lev Lobodin	Russia	1 April 1969	35	29–30 May 2004	Götzis, Austria	Hypo-Meeting	
M 35	100m (wind) / Long jump (wind) / Shot put / High jump / 400m / 110m H (wind) / Discus / Pole vault / Javelin / 1500m; 10.98 (+0.5 m/s) / 7.35 m (+0.6 m/s) / 15.21 m / 2.03 m / 49.59 / 14.20 (+0.3 m/s) / 46.03 m / 5.20 m / 53.43 m / 4:43.28								
M 35	8802* (hs 1.06)	Damian Warner	Canada	4 November 1989	35	31 May–1 June 2025	Götzis, Austria	Hypo-Meeting	
M 35	100m (wind) / Long jump (wind) / Shot put / High jump / 400m / 110m H (wind) / Discus / Pole vault / Javelin / 1500m; 10.39 (−1.0 m/s) / 7.51 m (+0.9 m/s) / 14.41 m / 2.00 m / 47.57 / 13.76 (+0.5 m/s) / 47.34 m / 4.70 m / 62.30 m / 4:38.44								
M 40	8451 (old: 8542)	Kip Janvrin	United States	8 July 1965	40	24 August 2005	San Sebastián, Spain	World Masters Championships	
M 40	100m (wind) / Long jump (wind) / Shot put / High jump / 400m / 110m H (wind) / Discus / Pole vault / Javelin / 1500m; 11.56 (−0.8 m/s) / 6.78 m (+1.0 m/s) / 14.01 m / 1.80 m / 49.46 / 15.40 (+0.2 m/s) / 42.70 m / 4.70 m / 58.43 m / 4:25.87								
M 45	7719 (old: 7867)	Paul Jeffery	Australia	14 January 1974	45	24 July 2019	Perth, Australia	Western Meet	
M 45	100m (wind) / Long jump (wind) / Shot put / High jump / 400m / 110m H (wind) / Discus / Pole vault / Javelin / 1500m; 11.55 (+2.6 m/s) / 6.05 m (+0.7 m/s) / 11.41 m / 1.70 m / 53.97 / 16.75 (+1.5 m/s) / 38.49 m / 3.80 m / 55.87 m / 4:58.91								
M 50	7124	Eric Roso	France	31 May 1976	50	24–25 August 2026	Daegu, South Korea	World Masters Championships	
M 50	100m (wind) / Long jump (wind) / Shot put / High jump / 400m / 110m H (wind) / Discus / Pole vault / Javelin / 1500m; 12.62 (+0.8 m/s) / 5.49 m (+0.1 m/s) / 12.26 m / 1.60 m / 59.31 / 15.27 (+0.1 m/s) / 40.69 m / 3.30 m / 48.53 m / 5:35.52								
M 50	8140 (old: 8247) (old javelin design)	Mattias Sunneborn	Sweden	27 September 1970	50	21–22 August 2021	Copenhagen, Denmark	DM Multiple events	
M 50	100m (wind) / Long jump (wind) / Shot put / High jump / 400m / 110m H (wind) / Discus / Pole vault / Javelin / 1500m; 11.63 (+0.4 m/s) / 6.28 m (±0.0 m/s) / 12.88 m / 1.76 m / 51.67 / 14.79 (−1.9 m/s) / 38.93 m / 3.11 m / 47.99 m / 5:17.03								
M 55	6921	Mark Jeffery	Australia	1970	56	1–2 September 2026	Daegu, South Korea	World Masters Championships	
M 55	100m (wind) / Long jump (wind) / Shot put / High jump / 400m / 110m H (wind) / Discus / Pole vault / Javelin / 1500m; 13.10 (+0.9 m/s) / 5.17 m (+0.4 m/s) / 12.11 m / 1.54 m / 1:02.25 / 21.23 (+0.2 m/s) / 40.97 m / 3.60 m / 50.39 m / 6:12.87								
M 55	8158 (old: 8312) (old javelin design)	Thomas Stewens	Germany	10 September 1966	55	19 September 2021	Bad Nauheim, Germany	27. Jedermann-Zehnkampf	
M 55	100m (wind) / Long jump (wind) / Shot put / High jump / 400m / 110m H (wind) / Discus / Pole vault / Javelin / 1500m; 12.80 (+0.1 m/s) / 5.52 m (+0.8 m/s) / 13.27 m / 1.65 m / 57.01 / 15.41 (±0.0 m/s) / 32.45 m / 3.60 m / 46.05 m / 5:02.23								
M 55	8266* (old: 8425*) (old javelin design)	Rolf Geese	Germany	19 February 1944	55	4 July 1999	Göttingen, Germany		
M 55	100m (wind) / Long jump (wind) / Shot put / High jump / 400m / 100m H (wind) / Discus / Pole vault / Javelin / 1500m; 12.41 (+0.7 m/s) / 5.66 m (+1.2 m/s) / 11.59 m / 1.61 m / 56.21 / 15.1 h (+0.4 m/s) / 40.80 m / 3.62 m / 44.14 m* / 5:07.79; *Note: 800g javelin								
M 60	7735 (old: 8123)	Wolfgang Ritte	Germany	7 January 1953	61	1 June 2014	Stendal, Germany	Stendaler Hanse-Cup	
M 60	100m (wind) / Long jump (wind) / Shot put / High jump / 400m / 100m H (wind) / Discus / Pole vault / Javelin / 1500m; 12.76 (−0.5 m/s) / 5.52 m (±0.0 m/s) / 12.64 m / 1.55 m / 62.27 / 15.33 (+1.5 m/s) / 38.74 m / 4.00 m / 35.98 m / 7:06.64								
M 60	7801 (old: 8202)	Hubert Indra	Italy	24 March 1957	61	3 June 2018	Arezzo, Italy	Italian Masters Multiple Events Championships	
M 60	100m (wind) / Long jump (wind) / Shot put / High jump / 400m / 110m H (wind) / Discus / Pole vault / Javelin / 1500m; 13.62 (+0.8 m/s) / 4.83 m (+2.2 m/s) / 11.58 m / 1.66 m / 62.19 / 15.60 (+1.3 m/s) / 41.19 m / 3.80 m / 41.16 m / 5:42.63								
M 60	7752 (old: 8158)	Hubert Indra	Italy	24 March 1957	61	5 September 2018	Málaga, Spain	World Masters Championships	
M 60	100m (wind) / Long jump (wind) / Shot put / High jump / 400m / 110m H (wind) / Discus / Pole vault / Javelin / 1500m; 13.58 (+0.3 m/s) / 4.90 m (−1.6 m/s) / 11.60 m / 1.67 m / 62.35 / 15.94 (−1.5 m/s) / 42.15 m / 3.70 m / 41.25 m / 5:46.27								
M 65	7780	Vytautas Zaniauskas	Lithuania	31 May 1960	65	11 October 2025	Madeira, Portugal	European Masters Championships	
M 65	100m (wind) / Long jump (wind) / Shot put / High jump / 400m / 110m H (wind) / Discus / Pole vault / Javelin / 1500m; 13.04 (−0.8 m/s) / 5.06 m (+0.5 m/s) / 11.54 m / 1.47 m / 1:05.20 / 15.83 (+2.3 m/s) / 40.30 m / 3.00 m / 32.78 m / 6:20.72								
M 70	7501 (old: 7837)	Valdis Cela	Latvia	1 February 1948	70	26–27 May 2018	Stendal, Germany	Stendaler Hanse-Cup	
M 70	100m (wind) / Long jump (wind) / Shot put / High jump / 400m / 80m H (wind) / Discus / Pole vault / Javelin / 1500m; 14.50 (+1.8 m/s) / 4.57 m (±0.0 m/s) / 10.64 m / 1.45 m / 70.53 / 14.27 (−0.1 m/s) / 30.55 m / 3.30 m / 33.84 m / 6:25.93								
M 75	7752 (old: 8538)	Rolf Geese	Germany	19 February 1944	75	2 June 2019	Stendal, Germany	Stendaler Hanse-Cup	
M 75	100m (wind) / Long jump (wind) / Shot put / High jump / 400m / 80m H (wind) / Discus / Pole vault / Javelin / 1500m; 14.64 (+0.9 m/s) / 4.10 m (±0.0 m/s) / 10.60 m / 1.28 m / 70.05 / 14.55 (−2.9 m/s) / 33.21 m / 2.80 m / 29.62 m / 6:30.47								
M 80	7052 (old: 8302)	Robert Hewitt	United States	30 March 1933	80	23 June 2013	Charlotte, United States	USATF National Decathlon / Heptathlon Championships	
M 80	100m (wind) / Long jump (wind) / Shot put / High jump / 400m / 80m H (wind) / Discus / Pole vault / Javelin / 1500m; 15.39 (−0.1 m/s) / 4.16 m (−0.7 m/s) / 10.18 m / 1.25 m / 1:20.16 / 15.98 (±0.0 m/s) / 26.53 m / 2.35 m / 26.51 m / 8:46.90								
M 80	7221 (old: 8494)	Osmo Villanen	Finland	28 March 1936	80	19 July 2016	Aanekoski, Finland	Finland Masters Decathlon / Heptathlon Championships	
M 80	100m (wind) / Long jump (wind) / Shot put / High jump / 400m / 80m H (wind) / Discus / Pole vault / Javelin / 1500m; 16.26 (−0.5 m/s) / 3.83 m (+1.2 m/s) / 11.03 m / 1.27 m / 1:19.87 / 15.63 (+1.5 m/s) / 24.75 m / 2.40 m / 32.13 m / 7:53.8								
M 85	6401	Willi Klaus	Germany	6 November 1938	85	22 September 2024	Herzogenaurach, Germany	International Jedermann Multiple Events	
M 85	100m (wind) / Long jump (wind) / Shot put / High jump / 400m / 80m H (wind) / Discus / Pole vault / Javelin / 1500m; 17.76 (−2.0 m/s) / 3.39 m (+0.1 m/s) / 8.57 m / 1.19 m / 1:28.77 / 19.88 (−0.7 m/s) / 19.42 m / 2.00 m / 18.49 m / 8:05.66								
M 90	5320 (old: 7069)	Ralph Maxwell	United States	26 November 1919	91	7 July 2011	Sacramento, United States	World Masters Championships	
M 90	100m (wind) / Long jump (wind) / Shot put / High jump / 400m / 80m H (wind) / Discus / Pole vault / Javelin / 1500m; 19.69 (−0.9 m/s) / 2.63 m (+1.4 m/s) / 6.17 m / 1.03 m / 1:49.24 / 21.62 (−1.5 m/s) / 13.98 m / 1.40 m / 18.30 m / 11:35.51								

=== Throws pentathlon ===
Note: per 1-1-2023 new scorings are in use, scorings from 2010/2014 are given between brackets.

Age group	Record	Athlete	Nationality	Birthdate	Age	Date	Place	Meet	Ref.
M 35	4396 (old: 4415)	Alfred Kruger III	United States	18 February 1979	35	21 September 2014	Ashland, United States		
M 35		Hammer / Shot put / Discus / Javelin / Weight; 70.81m / 14.28m / 47.47m / 46.84m / 22.48m							
M 40	4699 (old: 4852)	Chris Harmse	South Africa	31 May 1973	41	16 May 2015	Port Elizabeth, South Africa	South Africa Masters Championships	
M 40		Hammer / Shot put / Discus / Javelin / Weight; 72.24m / 14.87m / 49.53m / 47.84m / 20.84m							
M 45	4421 (old: 4616)	Iver Hytten	Norway	3 January 1966	46	28 April 2012	Tønsberg, Norway		
M 45		Hammer / Shot put / Discus / Javelin / Weight; 46.10m / 14.85m / 48.05m / 56.50m / 16.58m							
M 50	3801	Ralf Mordhorst	Germany	11 May 1973	53	2 September 2026	Daegu, South Korea	World Masters Championships	
M 50		Hammer / Shot put / Discus / Javelin / Weight; 39.22 m / 13.98 m / 51.48 m / 48.43 m / 14.69 m							
M 50	4553 (old: 4696) (old javelin design)	Norbert Demmel	Germany	10 May 1963	53	14 May 2016	Dingolfing, Germany		
M 50		Hammer / Shot put / Discus / Javelin / Weight; 52.51m / 16.18m / 55.66m / 50.10m / 18.78m							
M 55	4414	Eric Cole	United States	7 May 1970	56	1 August 2026	Rock Island, United States	USA Masters Throws Championships	
M 55		Hammer / Shot put / Discus / Javelin / Weight; 54.72 m / 13.48 m / 49.49 m / 33.32 m / 20.08 m							
M 55	4910 (old: 5103) (old javelin design)	Norbert Demmel	Germany	10 May 1963	55	14 September 2018	Málaga, Spain	World Masters Championships	
M 55		Hammer / Shot put / Discus / Javelin / Weight; 51.06m / 14.91m / 54.02m / 55.57m / 18.56m							
M 60	4726 (old 5034)	Norbert Demmel	Germany	10 May 1963	60	20 May 2023	Linz, Austria	3° VÖEST Throws Pentathlon	
M 60		Hammer / Shot put / Discus / Javelin / Weight; 51.94m / 15.05m / 59.62m / 40.50m / 21.86m							
M 65	4912 (old: 5255)	Arild Busterud	Norway	26 January 1948	65	26 October 2013	Porto Alegre, Brazil	World Masters Championships	
M 65		Hammer / Shot put / Discus / Javelin / Weight; 57.70m / 14.46m / 50.43m / 32.87m / 21.54m							
M 70	4657 (old: 5067)	Arild Busterud	Norway	26 January 1948	70	15 September 2018	Málaga, Spain	World Masters Championships	
M 70		Hammer / Shot put / Discus / Javelin / Weight; 56.72m / 14.22m / 43.35m / 29.71m / 21.52m							
M 75	4805 (old: 5182)	Carmelo Rado	Italy	4 August 1933	75	26 October 2008	Biella, Italy	Throws Pentathlon Meet	
M 75		Hammer / Shot put / Discus / Javelin / Weight; 44.93m / 12.86m / 43.77m / 35.90m / 17.80m							
M 80	4412 (old: 5317)	Hermann Albrecht	Germany	6 April 1940	80	18 July 2020	Osnabrück, Germany	Masters Throws Pentathlon	
M 80		Hammer / Shot put / Discus / Javelin / Weight; 50.69m / 11.92m / 28.24m / 32.52m / 18.45m							
M 80	4425 (old: 5258)	Carmelo Rado	Italy	4 August 1933	80	8 September 2013	Aosta, Italy	Grand Prix Throws Pentathlon Master	
M 80		Hammer / Shot put / Discus / Javelin / Weight; 38.08m / 12.49m / 39.46m / 30.60m / 17.92m							
M 85	4617 (old: 5460)	Östen Edlund	Sweden	26 November 1934	85	19 September 2020	Sollentuna, Sweden	Masters Throws Pentathlon	
M 85		Hammer / Shot put / Discus / Javelin / Weight; 36.75m / 11.71m / 34.61m / 25.55m / 15.41m							
M 90	4238	Osten Edlund	Sweden	26 November 1934	90	6 July 2025	Tumba, Sweden	Masters Throws Pentathlon	
M 90		Hammer / Shot put / Discus / Javelin / Weight; 27.19 m / 9.92 m / 27.98 m / 20.18 m / 10.75 m							
M 95	4470 (old: 5459)	William Platts	United States	18 April 1928	95	6 October 2023 (Note: by official result source; 10 July 2023 by WMA source, a typo)	Las Vegas, United States	Nevada Senior Games	
M 95		Hammer / Shot put / Discus / Javelin / Weight; 20.46m / 7.76m / 20.35m / 5.17m / 8.25m							
M 100	2453	Lauri Helle	Finland	1 May 1925	100	6 June 2025	Salo, Finland	Throws Meet	
M 100		Hammer / Shot put / Discus / Javelin / Weight; 8.36m / 4.63m / 9.46m / 6.78m / 5.27m							

=== 4×100 metres relay ===
Age group	Record	Athlete	Nationality	Birthdate	Date	Place	Meet	Ref.	Video
M 35	40.92	Takahito Aragaki, Masayuki Yano, Munenori Yamakawa, Hiroki Toma	Japan	20 Sep 1984; 5 Nov 1986; 1 Sep 1987; 23 Jun 1987	10 September 2023	Okinawa, Japan	Okinawa Masters Championships		
M 40	41.89	Marcus Barnes, Tom Gates, Keith Major, Antoine Echols	United States	28 Dec 1982; 26 Apr 1983; 12 March 1985; 6 Aug 1982	27 August 2026	Daegu, South Korea	World Masters Championships		
M 40	41.4	Speedwest TC: Aaron Thigpen; Kevin Morning; Kettrell Berry; Willie Gault	United States	18 September 1964; 28 June 1956; 27 December 1962; 5 September 1960	11 June 2005	Culver City, United States	USATF Southern California Masters Age-Group Championships		
M 45	43.27	Takeshi Fukuzato, Masato Minakuchi, Narufusa Koga, Nobuharu Asahara	Japan	12 January 1971; 8 April 1974; 26 November 1971; 21 June 1972	6 December 2019	Kuching, Malaysia	Asia Masters Championships		
M 50	44.08	Masashi Sato, Masato Minakuchi, Hiroaki Akabori, Takeshi Fukuzato	Japan	10 October 1972; 8 April 1974; 21 June 1972; 12 January 1971	17 August 2024	Gothenburg, Sweden	World Masters Championships		
M 55	45.07	Reginald Pendland, Arif Husain, Lloyd Hightower, David Gibbon	United States	29 June 1969; 25 December 1968; 13 April 1968; 10 December 1969	17 August 2024	Gothenburg, Sweden	World Masters Championships		
M 60	47.93	Ralph Peterson, Thaddeus Wilson, Charles Allie, Leo Sanders	United States	22 August 1949; 22 December 1950; 20 August 1947; 26 January 1951	17 July 2011	Sacramento, United States	World Masters Championships		
M 65	49.22	Pat Logan, John Wright, Ricardo Huskisson, Andy Hunter	Great Britain	31 July 1960; 15 June 1959; 31 October 1959; 3 December 1959	18 October 2025	Madeira, Portugal	European Masters Championships		
M 70	51.12	Thomas Jones, Michael Kish, Steven Snow, Ron Stevens	United States	28 November 1953; 9 February 1951; 23 June 1954; 23 February 1954	17 August 2024	Gothenburg, Sweden	World Masters Championships		
M 75	55.44	Hermann Beckering, Klaus Dieter Lange, Karl Schmid, Guido Müller	Germany	23 March 1939; 1 May 1939; 23 January 1938; 22 December 1938	31 August 2014	İzmir, Turkey	European Masters Championships		
M 80	61.83	Horst Albrecht, Gerhard Herbst, Kurt Schumacher, Rudolf Breder	Germany	14 July 1923; 14 January 1924; 5 July 1924; 17 March 1923	1 August 2004	Aarhus, Denmark	European Masters Championships		
M 85	1:07.03	Yasuyuki Ishida, Hiroo Tanaka, Hitoshi Masuda, Tadashi Ishikawa	Japan	11 July 1930; 8 December 1930; 16 June 1932; 18 September 1933	28 October 2018	Nara City, Japan	International Gold Masters		
M 90	1:27.37 (Note: by official result source; 1:27.36 by WMA source, probably a typo)	Roberto Maiocchi, Francesco Paderno, Vincenzo Vanda, Remo Marchioni	Italy	31 October 1934; 24 March 1935; 15 March 1934; 30 September 1935	25 October 2025	Novara, Italy	1° Meeting Regionale di Staffetta		

=== 4×400 metres relay ===
Age group	Record	Athlete	Nationality	Birthdate	Date	Place	Meet	Ref.	Video
M 35	3:16.53	Damaine Benjamin, Craig Cox, Lewis Robson, Dale Willis	Great Britain	12 March 1988; 27 December 1986; 9 January 1988; 17 June 1988	25 August 2024	Gothenburg, Sweden	World Masters Championships		
M 40	3:20.83	Sal Allah, Kevin Morning, Ed Gonera, Ray Blackwell	United States	1 January 1960; 28 June 1956; 15 May 1952; 15 May 1958	28 April 2001	Philadelphia, United States	Penn Relays		
M 45	3:22.79	Anthony Karnell Vickers, Mark Gomes, Lee Bridges, Allen Woodard	United States	21 February 1967; 30 November 1970; 20 March 1967; 16 January 1969	29 April 2017	Philadelphia, United States	Penn Relays		
M 50	3:31.76	Michael Sullivan, Corey Moody, Darnell Gatling, Ray Blackwell	United States	26 February 1961; 7 April 1961; 1 May 1960; 15 May 1958	17 July 2011	Sacramento, United States	World Masters Championships		
M 55	3:40.62	Charles Allie, George Haywood, Bill Collins, Horace Grant	United States	20 August 1947; 30 September 1952; 20 November 1950; 15 January 1953	23 April 2010	Philadelphia, United States	Penn Relays		
M 60	3:51.19	Ted Spitzer, Peter Oberließen, Rainer Strehle, Roland Gröger	Germany	3 September 1963; 29 December 1960; 12 February 1964; 7 August 1964	25 August 2024	Gothenburg, Sweden	World Masters Championships		
M 65	4:01.03	David Ortman, Thomas Jones, George Haywood, Charles Allie	United States	28 March 1953; 28 November 1953; 30 September 1952; 20 August 1947	1 September 2019	Alexandria, United States	Potomac Valley Games		
M 70	4:17.47	Willi Scheidt, Adolf Nehren, Willi Klaus, Guido Müller	Germany	7 July 1939; 19 February 1939; 6 November 1938; 22 December 1938	8 August 2009	Lahti, Finland	World Masters Championships		
M 75	4:47.85	Karl Jakob, Willi Klaus, Dr. Hartmann Knorr, Guido Müller	Germany	2 October 1939; 6 November 1938; 21 March 1940; 22 December 1938	16 August 2015	Lyon, France	World Masters Championships		
M 80	5:32.29	Leo Coffey, Richard Hughes, David Carr, George Harrod	Australia	4 February 1930; 8 March 1932; 15 June 1932; 20 August 1929	5 November 2012	Gold Coast, Australia	Pan Pacific Master Games		
M 85	6:53.22	Giancarlo Vecchi, Remo Marchioni, Benito Bertaggia, Francesco Paderno	Italy	24 April 1936; 30 September 1935; 5 April 1937; 24 March 1935	8 October 2022	Pistoia, Italy	Italian Masters Championships Throws Pentathlon		
M 90	8:17.56	Andrea Corvetti, Vincenzo Vanda, Remo Marchioni, Francesco Paderno	Italy	28 October 1932; 15 March 1934; 30 September 1935; 24 March 1935	25 October 2025	Novara, Italy	1° Meeting Regionale di Staffetta		

=== 4×800 metres relay ===
Age group	Record	Athlete	Nationality	Birthdate	Date	Place	Meet	Ref.
M 35	7:34.86	Harry Wakefield; David Scott; Matthew Revier; David Proctor	Great Britain	17 October 1989; 20 May 1988; 5 May 1989; 22 October 1985	24 August 2025	Bury, United Kingdom	Bury Track Mile	
M 40	7:54.17	John Hinton; Brian Pope; Kevin Paulk; Tony Young	United States	1 May 1962; 3 December 1962; 28 July 1960; 12 April 1962	27 June 2004	Eugene, United States	Hayward Classic	
M 45	8:10.98	Pat Davis; David Locker; James Thie; Charlie Thurstan	Great Britain	14 December 1975; 28 March 1975; 27 June 1978; 11 February 1975	25 August 2023	Redditch, United Kingdom	Edgar Nicholls Open	
M 50	8:25.79	Gunnar Durén; Patrik Johansson; Mats Olsson; Per Björkman	Sweden	16 September 1963; 15 February 1965; 16 December 1965; 2 March 1965	20 August 2016	Upplands Väsby, Sweden	Väsbyspelen	
M 55	8:46.03	Stephen Allen; Andrew Ridley; Adrian Haines; Stephen Atkinson	Great Britain	18 January 1968; 24 July 1964; 21 April 1967; 4 April 1967	25 August 2023	Redditch, United Kingdom	Edgar Nicholls Open	
M 60	9:04.92	Robert McHarg; Rob Andrew; Andrew Ridley; David Clarke	Great Britain	12 January 1964; 28 May 1963; 24 July 1964; 6 November 1959	14 September 2024	Birmingham, United Kingdom	British Masters Pentathlon & 5000m Champs BMAF	
M 65	10:16.67	Tim Owen; Robert Whitaker; Michael Lebold; David Westenberg	United States	12 March 1959; 1959; 7 August 1957; 28 November 1957	18 July 2024	Sacramento, United States	USATF Masters Championships	
M 70	10:35.59	Graham Webster; Stewart Thorp; Derek Jackson; David Oxland	Great Britain	2 April 1952; 16 March 1952; 23 May 1951; 21 May 1951	9 July 2022	Birmingham, United Kingdom	University of Birmingham Track and Field Festival	
M 75	12:27.64	Mark Stewart; Terry Riggins; Fred Pawluk; Pat Harton	Canada	22 July 1944; 26 June 1947; 6 July 1947; 11 September 1941	28 August 2022	Surrey, Canada	Masters Track and Combined Events Meet	
M 80	14:01.14	Heinz Ebermann; Herbert Müller; Alfred Girault; Werner Beecker	Germany	16 August 1931; 12 November 1929; 15 September 1933; 25 June 1932	27 September 2013	Essen-Stoppenberg, Germany		
M 85	23:28.41	Joe Cordero; William Masterson; Ram Satyaprasad; Robert Randall	United States	5 March 1938; 11 May 1938; 4 July 1938; 1937	18 July 2024	Sacramento, United States	USATF Masters Championships	
M 90	22:30.90	Andrea Corvetti, Vincenzo Vanda, Remo Marchioni, Francesco Paderno	Italy	28 October 1932; 15 March 1934; 30 September 1935; 24 March 1935	20 June 2026	Novara, Italy	Regional Meeting - 35° Trofeo Dellomodarme	

=== 5000 metres race walk ===
Age group	Record	Athlete	Nationality	Birthdate	Age	Date	Place	Meet	Ref.
M 35
M 35	18:22.41	Yohann Diniz	France	1 January 1978	37	10 May 2015	Tourcoing France	Interclubs Nord Championships	
M 35	18:30.43	Maurizio Damilano	Italy	6 April 1957	35	11 June 1992	Caserta Italy		
M 40	19:45.65	Willi Sawall	Australia	7 November 1941	42	31 March 1984	Melbourne Australia		
M 40	19:41.61	Tim Berrett	Canada	23 January 1965	40	29 July 2005	Edmonton Canada	World Masters Games	
M 40	18:57.13	Yohann Diniz	France	1 January 1978	40	20 May 2018	Reims France	Interclubs Nord Championships	
M 45	20:28.28	Alex Florez Studer	Spain	11 May 1971	46	3 June 2017	Palma de Mallorca Spain	Balears Athletics Championships	
M 45	19:52.98	Joao Vieira	Portugal	20 February 1976	45	3 July 2021	Guimarães Portugal	National Teams Championship	
M 50	20:57.13	Takahiro Sato	Japan	13 September 1974	51	2 September 2026	Daegu, South Korea	World Masters Championships	
M 55	22:11.5 h	Willi Sawall	Australia	7 November 1941	55	26 January 1997	Ballarat Australia	Victorian Track & Field Championships	
M 60	22:38.7 h	Arthur Jamieson	Australia	13 June 1946	60	1 March 2007	Melbourne Australia	Victoria Championships	
M 65	24:13.10	Ian Richards	Great Britain	12 April 1948	65	18 October 2013	Porto Alegre Brazil	World Masters Athletics Championships	
M 70	25:48.50	Ian Richards	Great Britain	12 April 1948	70	26 August 2018	Birmingham, United Kingdom	British Masters Athletics Championships	
M 75	27:40.0 h	James Grimwade	Great Britain	17 May 1912	75	28 June 1987	Solihull, United Kingdom		
M 80	29:24.1 h	James Grimwade	Great Britain	17 May 1912	80	7 June 1992	Solihull, United Kingdom	Midland Masters Championships	
M 85	33:15.0 h	Augustus Theobald	Australia	5 March 1897	85	10 April 1982	Perth Australia	Australian Athletics Masters Championships	
M 90	35:10.0 h	Augustus Theobald	Australia	5 March 1897	90	18 April 1987	Sydney Australia	Australian Athletics Masters Championships	
M 95	42:58.7 h	Philip Rabinowitz	South Africa	16 February 1904	96	28 April 2000	Oudtshoorn South Africa	South Africa Masters Championships	
M 95	39:39.0 h	Philip Rabinowitz	South Africa	16 February 1904	95	28 May 1999	Port Elizabeth South Africa	South Africa Masters Athletics Championships	
M 100	47:59.2 h	Philip Rabinowitz	South Africa	16 February 1904	100	13 November 2004	Parow South Africa		

== Women ==
=== 100 metres women ===
Age group	Record	Athlete	Nationality	Birthdate	Age	Date	Place	Meet	Ref.
W 35 (progression)	10.62 (+0.4 m/s)	Shelly-Ann Fraser-Pryce	Jamaica	27 Dec 1986	35	10 August 2022	Monaco	Herculis	
W 40 (progression)	11.09 (+2.0 m/s)	Merlene Ottey	Slovenia	10 May 1960	44	3 August 2004	Naimette-Xhovemont (Liège), Belgium	Meeting International d'Athlétisme de la Province de Liège	
W 40 (progression)	10.99 (−1.2 m/s)	Merlene Ottey	Slovenia	10 May 1960	40	30 August 2000	Thessaloniki, Greece	Olympic Meeting Thessaloniki	
W 45 (progression)	11.34 (+1.8 m/s)	Merlene Ottey	Slovenia	10 May 1960	46	12 August 2006	Glasgow, United Kingdom	Scottish Championships	
W 50 (progression)	11.67 (+0.9 m/s)	Merlene Ottey	Slovenia	10 May 1960	50	13 July 2010	Novo Mesto, Slovenia	Krka Meet	
W 55 (progression)	12.24 (+1.9 m/s)	Julie Brims	Australia	7 January 1966	55	13 February 2021	Canberra, Australia	AACT Open Championships	
W 55 (progression)	12.15 (+1.9 m/s)	Mandy Mason	Australia	16 December 1967	55	1 December 2023	Perth, Australia	Strive Program c	
W 60 (progression)	13.20 (±0.0 m/s)	Nicole Alexis	France	9 January 1960	62	30 June 2022	Tampere, Finland	World Masters Championships	
W 60 (progression)	13.17 (+2.0 m/s)	Nicole Alexis	France	9 January 1960	62	28 May 2022	Antony, France	Championnat départemental	
W 60 (progression)	13.05 (+1.0 m/s)	Nicole Alexis	France	9 January 1960	62	11 June 2022	Montgeron, France	Championnats d'ïle-de-France Senior	
W 65 (progression)	13.79 (+1.8 m/s)	Nicole Alexis	France	9 January 1960	65	31 May 2025	Les Sables-d'Olonne, France	Meeting du SEC Athlétisme	
W 70 (progression)	14.37 (−0.6 m/s)	Sara Montecinos	Chile	8 March 1954	71	24 November 2025	Santiago, Chile	Sudamericano Master Championships	
W 75 (progression)	15.03 (+0.6 m/s)	Carol LaFayette-Boyd	Canada	17 May 1942	76	4 August 2018	Surrey, Canada	National Masters Championships	
W 80 (progression)	16.23 (+1.3 m/s)	Kathy Bergen	United States	24 December 1939	81	19 September 2021	San Diego, United States		
W 80 (progression)	16.23 (+1.6 m/s)	Carol LaFayette-Boyd	Canada	17 May 1942	80	30 July 2022	Regina, Canada	National Masters Championships	
W 85 (progression)	17.97 (−0.8 m/s)	Kathy Bergen	United States	24 December 1939	85	18 July 2025	Huntsville, United States	USATF National Masters Championships	
W 90	21.25 (+1.1 m/s)	Emiko Saito	Japan	13 March 1931	90	16 October 2021	Ageo, Japan	Saitama Masters Autumn Record Meeting	
W 95	28.85 (−0.6 m/s)	Shizuko Kawamoto	Japan	1 September 1927	95	11 June 2023	Hiroshima, Japan	Hiroshima Masters Championships	
W 100	39.62 (+0.2 m/s)	Julia Hawkins	United States	9 February 1916	101	10 June 2017	Birmingham, United States	USATF National Senior Games	
W 100	36.71 (−1.6 m/s)	Diane Friedman	United States	18 July 1921	100	15 August 2021	Rochester, United States	Michigan Senior Olympics	
W 105	1:02.95 (+1.3 m/s)	Julia Hawkins	United States	9 February 1916	105	11 November 2021	Louisiana, United States	Louisiana Senior Games	

=== 200 metres women ===
Age group	Record	Athlete	Nationality	Birthdate	Age	Date	Place	Meet	Ref.
W 35 (progression)	21.81 (+0.6 m/s)	Shelly-Ann Fraser-Pryce	Jamaica	27 Dec 1986	35	21 July 2022	Eugene, United States	World Championships	
W 40 (progression)	22.72 (+1.4 m/s)	Merlene Ottey	Slovenia	10 May 1960	44	23 August 2004	Athens, Greece	Olympic Games	
W 40 (progression)	22.71 (+2.0 m/s)	Lorène Dorcas Bazolo	Portugal	4 May 1983	42	7 June 2025	Salamanca, Spain	Memorial Gil	
W 40 (progression)	22.61 (+0.8 m/s)	Lorène Dorcas Bazolo	Portugal	4 May 1983	42	29 June 2025	Madrid, Spain	European Team Championships	
W 45 (progression)	23.82 (−0.2 m/s)	Merlene Ottey	Slovenia	10 May 1960	46	27 August 2006	Banská Bystrica, Slovakia	Athletic Bridge	
W 50 (progression)	24.33 (+0.9 m/s)	Merlene Ottey	Slovenia	10 May 1960	50	18 July 2010	Velenje, Slovenia	Slovenian Championships	
W 55 (progression)	25.07 (+1.5 m/s)	Julie Brims	Australia	7 January 1966	55	7 March 2021	Brisbane, Australia	QMA State T&F Championships	
W 55 (progression)	24.63 (+1.7 m/s)	Mandy Mason	Australia	16 December 1967	55	25 November 2023	Perth, Australia	Strive Special Program	
W 60 (progression)	27.30 (+1.8 m/s)	Iris Opitz	Germany	23 April 1966	60	19 July 2026	Mönchengladbach, Germany	Germany Masters Championships	
W 65 (progression)	28.53 (+1.2 m/s)	Karla Del Grande	Canada	27 March 1953	65	5 August 2018	Surrey, Canada	National Masters Championships	
W 70 (progression)	30.05 (+0.6 m/s)	Karla Del Grande	Canada	27 March 1953	70	29 June 2024	Toronto, Canada	Ontario Masters Championships	
W 75 (progression)	31.56 (−0.7 m/s)	Carol LaFayette-Boyd	Canada	17 May 1942	76	9 September 2018	Málaga, Spain	World Masters Championships	
W 80 (progression)	34.38 (+0.5 m/s)	Carol LaFayette-Boyd	Canada	17 May 1942	80	31 July 2022	Regina, Canada	National Masters Championships	
W 80 (progression)	33.93 (−0.8 m/s)	Carol LaFayette-Boyd	Canada	17 May 1942	81	15 July 2023	Saskatoon, Canada	Saskatchewan Athletics Championships	
W 85 (progression)	39.55 (+1.4 m/s)	Mary Smith	United States	9 November 1940	85	19 July 2026	Geneva, United States	USATF Masters Championships	
W 90 (progression)	50.33 (+0.2 m/s)	Emma Mazzenga	Italy	1 August 1933	90	2 June 2024	Mestre, Italy	Regional Masters Championships	
W 95	1:12.99 (−0.4 m/s)	Diane Friedman	United States	18 July 1921	96	22 July 2017	Bedford, United States	Lake Erie Open & Masters Championships	
W 100	1:29.79 (−0.5 m/s)	Diane Friedman	United States	18 July 1921	100	15 August 2021	Rochester, United States	Michigan Senior Olympics	

=== 400 metres women ===
Age group	Record	Athlete	Nationality	Birthdate	Age	Date	Place	Meet	Ref.
W 35 (progression)	49.46	Allyson Felix	United States	18 November 1985	35	6 August 2021	Tokyo, Japan	Olympic Games	
W 40 (progression)	53.68 A	Sara Montecinos	Chile	8 March 1954	40	20 March 1994	Cali, Colombia	Sudamerica Masters Championships	
W 40 (progression)	52.50	Geisa Aparecida Coutinho	Brazil	1 June 1980	40	9 April 2021	Bragança Paulista, Brazil	Open de Velocidade	
W 40 (progression)	53.52	Sonja Keil	Germany	12 June 1985	40	29 June 2025	Sankt Wendel, Germany	South German Championships	
W 40 (progression)	53.05 A	Maria Magnólia Figueiredo	Brazil	11 November 1963	40	10 July 2004	Bogotá, Colombia	SAM Grand Prix	
W 45 (progression)	56.14	Angee Henry-Nott	United States	21 December 1975	45	23 July 2021	Ames, United States	USATF Masters Championships	
W 50 (progression)	57.55	Sally Cooke	Great Britain	9 April 1970	52	12 June 2022	Derby, United Kingdom	British Masters Championships	
W 55 (progression)	59.36	Julie Brims	Australia	7 January 1966	55	23 January 2021	Brisbane, Australia	Queensland Shield Series: Dane Bird-Smith Shield	
W 55 (progression)	57.86	Mandy Mason	Australia	16 December 1967	56	31 March 2024	Hobart, Australia	Australia Masters Championships	
W 60 (progression)	1:01.73	Susan McDonald	United States	29 March 1963	60	19 July 2024	Sacramento, United States	USA Masters Championships	
W 65 (progression)	1:07.23	Elizabeth Deak	United States	24 February 1958	65	21 July 2023	Greensboro, United States	USA Masters Championships	
W 65 (progression)	1:06.94 i	Edel Maguire	Ireland	1959	66	30 March 2025	Gainesville, United States	World Masters Championships indoor	
W 70 (progression)	1:08.36	Sara Montecinos	Chile	8 March 1954	72	9 August 2026	Santiago, Chile	Torneo Eugenio Muñoz	
W 75 (progression)	1:17.71	Michelle Peroni-Edoh	France	7 August 1947	76	26 September 2023	Pescara, Italy	European Masters Championships	
W 75 (progression)	1:15.21	Michelle Peroni-Edoh	France	7 August 1947	75	24 June 2023	Laval, France	France Masters Championships	
W 80 (progression)	1:28.63	Marjorie Allison	Australia	13 September 1944	80	8 September 2025	Brisbane, Australia	Oceania Masters Championships	
W 85 (progression)	1:37.34	Kathleen Stewart	Great Britain	7 August 1939	85	21 June 2025	Jarrow, United Kingdom	North East Masters AA	
W 90	2:12.71	Emiko Saito	Japan	13 March 1931	91	3 April 2022	Ishioka, Japan	Ibaraki Masters Meet	
W 95	3:10.21	Heather Lee	Australia	17 November 1926	95	15 October 2022	Sydney, Australia	Treloar Shields Round 2	

=== 800 metres women ===
Age group	Record	Athlete	Nationality	Birthdate	Age	Date	Place	Meet	Ref.
W 35 (progression)	1:56.53	Lyubov Gurina	Russia	6 August 1957	36	30 July 1994	Hechtel, Belgium	KBC Night of Athletics	
W 40 (progression)	1:59.25	Yekaterina Podkopayeva	Russia	11 June 1952	42	30 June 1994	Luxembourg, Luxembourg		
W 45 (progression)	2:02.82	Yekaterina Podkopayeva	Russia	11 June 1952	46	26 June 1998	Moscow, Russia	Russian Junior Open Championships	
W 50 (progression)	2:12.50	Eva Trost	Germany	30 January 1968	50	3 August 2018	Neustadt, Germany	Neustadter Laufermeeting	
W 55 (progression)	2:19.63	Anne Gilshinan	Ireland	6 April 1964	55	8 June 2019	Dublin, Ireland	Le Chéile International	
W 60 (progression)	2:22.52	Sue McDonald	United States	29 March 1963	60	6 May 2023	Los Angeles, United States	Oxy invitational	
W 65 (progression)	2:38.05	Nancy Simmonds	United States	12 July 1959	66	19 October 2025	Montecito, United States	Beverley Lewis Memorial	
W 70 (progression)	2:50.22	Alison Bourgeois	Switzerland	30 April 1953	70	24 June 2023	Laval, France	France Masters Championships	
W 75 (progression)	2:58.12	Sarah Roberts	Great Britain	6 October 1949	75	5 May 2025	Stevenage, United Kingdom	Hertfordshire County Championships	
W 75 (progression)	2:57.32 i	Sarah Roberts	Great Britain	6 October 1949	75	22 February 2025	London, United Kingdom	British Masters Championships	
W 80 (progression)	3:30.41	Yoko Nakano	Japan	1 December 1935	82	11 September 2018	Málaga, Spain	World Masters Championships	
W 80 (progression)	3:25.80	Yolande Marchal	France	10 September 1939	81	10 October 2020	Chalon-sur-Saône, France	National Masters Championships	
W 80 (progression)	3:18.74 i	Yolande Marchal	France	10 September 1939	80	11 January 2020	Miramar, France	Pré Régionaux Individuels en salle	
W 85 (progression)	3:36.14	Yolande Marchal	France	10 September 1939	85	30 May 2025	Cannes, France	Championnats Départementaux	
W 90	4:27.78	Yoko Nakano	Japan	1 December 1935	90	11 April 2026	Tokyo, Japan	Tokyo Masters Spring Meet	
W 95	6:49.14	Heather Lee	Australia	17 November 1926	95	22 October 2022	Homebush, Australia	Treloar Shields Round 3	
W 95	6:35.34	Heather Lee	Australia	17 November 1926	96	5 February 2023	Campbelltown, Australia	NSW Masters Championships	

=== 1500 metres women ===
Age group	Record	Athlete	Nationality	Birthdate	Age	Date	Place	Meet	Ref.
W 35 (progression)	3:57.73	Maricica Puica	Romania	29 July 1950	35	30 August 1985	Brussels, Belgium	Memorial Van Damme	
W 40 (progression)	3:59.78	Yekaterina Podkopayeva	Russia	11 June 1952	42	18 July 1994	Nice, France	Nikaia Meeting Grand Prix	
W 45 (progression)	4:05.44	Yekaterina Podkopayeva	Russia	11 June 1952	46	3 August 1998	Moscow, Russia	Russian Championships	
W 50 (progression)	4:35.40	Nicole Weijling-Dissel	Netherlands	16 June 1967	50	11 August 2017	Utrecht, Netherlands	Utrecht Track Meeting 4	
W 55 (progression)	4:41.46	Anne Gilshinan	Ireland	6 April 1964	55	22 June 2019	Belfast, Ireland	Belfast Irish Milers Meet	
W 60 (progression)	4:56.09	Clare Elms	Great Britain	26 December 1963	62	22 July 2026	Wimbledon, United Kingdom	Dave Clarke Mile	
W 65 (progression)	5:25.65	Kathryn Martin	United States	30 September 1951	65	12 August 2017	Toronto, Canada	NCCWMA	
W 65 (progression)	5:25.29 i	Kathryn Martin	United States	30 September 1951	65	25 March 2017	Daegu, South Korea	World Masters Championships indoor	
W 70 (progression)	5:46.9 h	Angela Copson	Great Britain	20 April 1947	70	4 June 2017	Nuneaton, United Kingdom	Midland Masters Championships	
W 75 (progression)	5:59.45	Sarah Roberts	Great Britain	6 October 1949	75	21 September 2025	Hemel Hempstead, United Kingdom	Dacorum AC Club Champs	
W 75 (progression)	5:58.15 i	Sarah Roberts	Great Britain	6 October 1949	75	23 February 2025	London, United Kingdom	British Masters Championships	
W 80 (progression)	6:52.77	Yoko Nakano	Japan	1 December 1935	80	17 July 2016	Tokyo, Japan	Kanto Masters Championships	
W 85 (progression)	7:37.31	Yoko Nakano	Japan	1 December 1935	85	13 November 2021	Tokyo, Japan	Tokyo Masters Meet	
W 90 (progression)	9:20.99	Yoko Nakano	Japan	1 December 1935	90	11 April 2026	Tokyo, Japan	Tokyo Masters Spring Meet	
W 95	12:46.55	Heather Lee	Australia	17 November 1926	95	6 November 2022	Campbelltown, Australia	Treloar Shields Round 4	

=== Mile women ===
Age group	Record	Athlete	Nationality	Birthdate	Age	Date	Place	Meet	Ref.
W 35	4:17.33	Maricica Puica	Romania	29 July 1950	35	21 August 1985	Zurich, Switzerland	Weltklasse Zürich	
W 40	4:23.78	Yekaterina Podkopayeva	Russia	11 June 1952	40	9 June 1993	Rome, Italy	Golden Gala	
W 45	4:48.42	Yekaterina Podkopayeva	Russia	11 June 1952	45	13 September 1997	Fukuoka, Japan	IAAF Grand Prix Final	
W 50	4:57.83	Nicole Weijling-Dissel	Netherlands	16 June 1967	50	27 August 2017	Lisse, Netherlands	Nazomerwedstrijd	
W 55	5:08.47	Anne Gilshinan	Ireland	6 April 1964	55	7 August 2019	Dublin, Ireland		
W 60	5:17.25	Clare Elms	Great Britain	26 December 1963	62	22 July 2026	Wimbledon, United Kingdom	Dave Clarke Mile	
W 65	5:54.59	Angela Copson	Great Britain	20 April 1947	68	19 July 2015	Solihull, United Kingdom	Inter-Area Match	
W 65	5:51.74 i	Kathryn Martin	United States	30 September 1951	65	2 March 2017	New York City, United States	NYRR Night at the races	
W 70	6:33.46	Anna Garnier	Great Britain	21 August 1954	70	23 July 2025	Wimbledon, United Kingdom	Dave Clarke Mile	
W 75	6:40.32	Sarah Roberts	Great Britain	6 October 1949	75	24 May 2025	Horspath, United Kingdom	BMAF champs Multiple Events/10000	
W 80	7:17.19	Jan Holmqvist	United States	18 May 1944	80	8 June 2024	Concord, United States	Adrian Martinez Classic	
W 85	9:46.65	Norma Minkowitz	United States	19 October 1937	86	13 July 2024	New Britain, United States	Nutmeg State Games	
W 90	12:48.59	Heather Lee	Australia	17 November 1926	93	11 January 2020	Wollongong, Australia	Illawarra Track Challenge Mile NSW Championship	
W 95	13:41.36	Heather Lee	Australia	17 November 1926	96	3 December 2022	Sydney, Australia	Albie Thomas Mile	

=== 3000 metres women ===
Age group	Record	Athlete	Nationality	Birthdate	Age	Date	Place	Meet	Ref.
W 35	8:27.83	Maricica Puica	Romania	29 July 1950	35	7 September 1985	Rome, Italy	Golden Gala	
W 35	8:23.23	Edith Masai	Kenya	4 April 1967	35	19 July 2002	Monaco	Herculis	
W 40 (progression)	9:03.40	Nuria Fernández	Spain	16 August 1976	40	24 June 2017	Lille, France	European Team Championships	
W 40 (progression)	9:01.1+ h	Joanne Pavey	Great Britain	20 September 1973	40	4 June 2014	Rome, Italy	Golden Gala	
W 40 (progression)	8:58.20 i	Nuria Fernández	Spain	16 August 1976	40	3 March 2017	Beograd, Serbia	European Indoor Championships	
W 45 (progression)	9:17.27	Yekaterina Podkopayeva	Russia	11 June 1952	45	22 June 1997	Munich, Germany	European Cup	
W 45 (progression)	9:11.67 i	Nicole Leveque	France	27 January 1951	45	11 February 1996	Paris, France	France International Championships	
W 50 (progression)	9:47.20	Gitte Karlshøj	Denmark	14 May 1959	50	19 May 2009	Aarhus, Denmark	ABC Staevne 1	
W 55 (progression)	10:03.90	Silke Schmidt	Germany	7 August 1959	55	10 July 2015	Utrecht, Netherlands	Utrecht Track Meeting	
W 60 (progression)	10:28.76	Clare Elms	Great Britain	26 December 1963	62	5 July 2026	Catford, United Kingdom	Ron Hale Open	
W 65 (progression)	11:19.82	Maryse Le Gallo	France	27 April 1960	65	4 May 2025	Auray, France		
W 70 (progression)	12:13.12	Angela Copson	Great Britain	20 April 1947	70	1 September 2018	Solihull, United Kingdom	Midland Veterans' League Final	
W 75 (progression)	12:38.84	Sarah Roberts	Great Britain	6 October 1949	75	13 July 2025	Cambridge, United Kingdom	Southern Athletics League Division 2 North & East	
W 75 (progression)	12:28.82 i	Sarah Roberts	Great Britain	6 October 1949	75	26 March 2025	Gainesville, United States	World Masters Indoor Championships	
W 80 (progression)	14:27.49	Yoko Nakano	Japan	1 December 1935	81	27 October 2017	Wakayama, Japan	Japan Masters Championships	
W 85	16:39.15	Yoko Nakano	Japan	1 December 1935	85	23 October 2021	Tokyo, Japan	21° East Japan Masters Championships	
W 90	19:28.87	Yoko Nakano	Japan	1 December 1935	90	28 June 2026	Tokyo, Japan	East Japan Masters Championships	

=== 5000 metres women ===
Age group	Record	Athlete	Nationality	Birthdate	Age	Date	Place	Meet	Ref.	Video
W 35 (progression)	14:33.84	Edith Masai	Kenya	4 April 1967	39	2 June 2006	Oslo, Norway	Bislett Games		
W 40 (progression)	15:04.87	Joanne Pavey	Great Britain	20 September 1973	40	5 June 2014	Rome, Italy	Golden Gala		
W 45 (progression)	15:55.71	Nicole Leveque	France	27 January 1951	45	1 June 1996	Angers, France			
W 50 (progression)	16:51.17	Gitte Karlshøj	Denmark	14 May 1959	50	23 June 2009	Aarhus, Denmark			
W 50 (progression)	16:19.51	Monica Joyce	United States	16 July 1958	50	17 April 2009	Walnut, United States	Mt. SAC Relays		
W 55 (progression)	17:29.28	Silke Schmidt	Germany	7 August 1959	55	27 June 2015	Eindhoven, Netherlands	Eef Kamerbeek Games		
W 60 (progression)	17:50.72	Sally Gibbs	New Zealand	5 June 1963	60	22 March 2024	Christchurch, New Zealand	Don Greig Twilight Challenge		
W 65 (progression)	19:21.72	Mariko Yugeta	Japan	13 May 1958	65	5 May 2024	Ageo, Japan	Saitama Masters record meet		
W 70 (progression)	20:56.13	Angela Copson	Great Britain	20 April 1947	70	25 June 2017	Birmingham, United Kingdom	British Masters Championships		
W 75	21:25.8h	Sarah Roberts	Great Britain	6 October 1949	75	25 September 2025	Hemel Hempstead, United Kingdom	Dacorum AC Club Champs 5000m		
W 80	25:40.14	Yoko Nakano	Japan	1 December 1935	81	12 September 2018	Málaga, Spain	World Masters Championships		
W 85	27:38.13	Yoko Nakano	Japan	1 December 1935	85	13 November 2021	Tokyo, Japan	Tokyo Masters Meet		
W 90
W 90	54:46.35	Margaret Hagerty	United States	25 March 1923	90	26 September 2013	Cary, United States	North Carolina Senior Games		
W 95	44:03.75	Heather Lee	Australia	17 November 1926	96	12 March 2023	Homebush, Australia	Australia Masters Championships		

=== 10000 metres women ===
Age group	Record	Athlete	Nationality	Birthdate	Age	Date	Place	Meet	Ref.
W 35 (progression)	30:53.20	Joanne Pavey	Great Britain	20 September 1973	38	3 August 2012	London, United Kingdom	Olympic Games	
W 35 (progression)	30:30.26	Edith Masai	Kenya	4 April 1967	38	6 August 2005	Helsinki, Finland	World Championships	
W 40 (progression)	31:25.49	Sinead Diver	Australia	17 February 1977	42	28 September 2019	Doha, Qatar	World Championships	
W 45 (progression)	32:34.06	Evy Palm	Sweden	31 January 1942	46	4 September 1988	Helsinki, Finland	Finland vs Sweden Teams	
W 50 (progression)	35:05.7	Fiona Matheson	Great Britain	25 April 1961	50	16 October 2011	Coatbridge, United Kingdom	Scottish Masters Harriers Championships	
W 55 (progression)	36:38.32	Michelle Rohl	United States	12 November 1965	59	14 June 2025	Portland, United States	Portland Track Festival	
W 60 (progression)	37:38.98 Mx	Sally Gibbs	New Zealand	5 June 1963	60	19 November 2023	Wellington, New Zealand	Agency Group 10000m Festival	
W 65 (progression)	39:57.40	Mariko Yugeta	Japan	13 May 1958	65	26 May 2024	Ageo, Japan	Saitama Championships Long distances	
W 70 (progression)	44:25.14	Angela Copson	Great Britain	20 April 1947	70	28 July 2017	Aarhus, Denmark	European Masters Championships	
W 75 (progression)	45:59.81	Sarah Roberts	Great Britain	6 October 1949	75	24 May 2025	Horspath, United Kingdom	BMAF champs Multiple Events/10000	
W 80 (progression)	51:46.65	Yoko Nakano	Japan	1 December 1935	82	6 May 2018	Tokyo, Japan	Tokyo Masters Mixed Championship	
W 85	1:26:15.07	Vladylena Kokina	Ukraine	13 October 1926	87	21 September 2014	Kyiv, Ukraine		

=== Marathon women ===
Age group	Record	Athlete	Nationality	Birthdate	Age	Date	Place	Meet	Ref.
W 35 (progression)	2:19:19	Irina Mikitenko	Germany	23 August 1972	36	28 September 2008	Berlin, Germany	Berlin Marathon	
W 35 (progression)	2:17:23	Mary Ngugi-Cooper	Kenya	17 December 1988	37	11 October 2026	Chicago, United States	Chicago Marathon	
W 35 (progression)	2:17:01	Mary Jepkosgei Keitany	Kenya	12 January 1982	35	23 April 2017	London, United Kingdom	London Marathon	
W 40 (progression)	2:22:27	Mariya Konovalova	Russia	14 August 1974	40	8 March 2015	Nagoya, Japan	Nagoya Marathon	
W 40 (progression)	2:19:52	Helalia Johannes	Namibia	13 August 1980	40	6 December 2020	Valencia, Spain	Valencia Marathon	
W 40 (progression)	2:22:11	Lydia Cheromei	Kenya	11 May 1977	41	2 December 2018	Valencia, Spain	Valencia Marathon	
W 45 (progression)	2:29:00	Tatyana Pozdnyakova	Ukraine	4 March 1955	46	13 October 2002	Providence, United States	Providence Marathon	
W 45 (progression)	2:28:34	Catherine Bertone	Italy	4 May 1972	45	23 September 2017	Berlin, Germany	Berlin Marathon	
W 45 (progression)	2:21:34	Sinead Diver	Australia	17 February 1977	45	4 December 2022	Valencia, Spain	Valencia Marathon	
W 50 (progression)	2:31:05	Tatyana Pozdnyakova	Ukraine	4 March 1955	50	6 March 2005	Los Angeles, United States	Los Angeles Marathon	
W 55 (progression)	2:45:51 (2:45:27c)	Jenny Hitchings	United States	1 July 1963	59	23 April 2023	London, United Kingdom	London Marathon	
W 60 (progression)	2:49:45 (2:49:43c)	Jenny Hitchings	United States	1 July 1963	60	8 October 2023	Chicago, United States	Chicago Marathon	
W 65 (progression)	2:59:02 (2:58:59c)	Mariko Yugeta	Japan	13 May 1958	67	16 November 2025	Kobe, Japan	Kobe Marathon	
W 70 (progression)	3:23:59 (3:23:54c)	Jennifer MacDonell	Canada	17 July 1956	70	18 October 2026	Toronto, Canada	Toronto Waterfront Marathon	
W 75 (progression)	3:48:02 (3:34:32c)	Jeannie Rice	United States	14 April 1948	75	8 October 2023	Chicago, United States	Chicago Marathon	
W 75 (progression)	3:41:55 (3:39:51c)	Vera Nystad	Norway	18 December 1945	75	3 July 2021	Jølster, Norway	NC NOR Masters Marathon	
W 80 (progression)	4:11:45	Yoko Nakano	Japan	1 December 1935	81	26 February 2017	Tokyo, Japan	Tokyo Marathon	
W 85 (progression)	5:14:26	Betty Jean McHugh	Canada	7 November 1927	85	9 December 2012	Honolulu, United States	Honolulu Marathon	
W 90	6:14:49 (6:12:54c)	Yoko Nakano	Japan	1 December 1935	90	14 December 2025	Miyazaki, Japan	Qingdao Pacific Marathon	

=== 80 metres hurdles women ===
Age group	Record	Athlete	Nationality	Birthdate	Age	Date	Place	Meet	Ref.
W 40 (progression)	11.24 (+0.1 m/s)	Monica Pellegrinelli	Switzerland	14 May 1965	40	31 August 2005	San Sebastián, Spain	World Masters Championships	
W 40 (progression)	11.24 (+1.2 m/s)	Olutoyin Augustus	Nigeria	24 December 1979	44	19 July 2024 (Note: by official result source; 18 July 2024 by WMA soure, a typo)	Sacramento, United States	USATF Masters Championships	
W 45 (progression)	11.47 (−1.1 m/s)	Olutoyin Augustus	Nigeria	24 December 1979	45	21 June 2025	Houston, United States	USATF Southwest Region Masters Championships	
W 50 (progression)	12.08 (+2.0 m/s)	Christine Müller	Switzerland	22 July 1958	50	10 July 2009	Vaterstetten Germany	Germany Masters Championships	
W 55 (progression)	12.31 (+0.8 m/s)	Helgi Lamp	Estonia	17 June 1944	55	17 July 1999	Haapsalu Estonia		
W 60 (progression)	12.90 (−0.1 m/s)	Jane Horder	Great Britain	18 January 1957	60	2 August 2017	Aarhus Denmark	European Masters Championships	
W 60 (progression)	12.90 (+0.7 m/s)	Neringa Jakstiene	United States	18 October 1963	60	7 October 2024	St. George, United States	Huntsman Senior Games	
W 65 (progression)	13.22 (+1.8 m/s)	Jane Horder	Great Britain	18 January 1957	65	12 June 2022	Derby, United Kingdom	British Masters Championships	
W 70 (progression)	15.61 (+1.0 m/s)	Somsanga Boonnok	Thailand	7 March 1955	71	23 August 2026	Daegu, South Korea	World Masters Championships	
W 70 (progression)	15.50 (−0.3 m/s)	Eliane Piret Declerck	France	2 December 1950	71	9 July 2022	Tampere, Finland	World Masters Championships	
W 75 (progression)	17.24 (+0.5 m/s)	Riet Jonkers	Netherlands	4 October 1943	75	27 July 2019	Dilbeek Belgium	Belgium Masters Pentathlon Championships	
W 80	18.70 (−0.1 m/s)	Irene Obera	United States	7 December 1933	82	4 November 2016	Perth, Australia	World Masters Championships	
W 85 (progression)	26.69 (+0.6 m/s)	Florence Meiler	United States	7 June 1934	87	22 July 2021	Ames, United States	USATF Masters Championships	
W 90	34.55 (+0.1 m/s) (Note: record set during pentathlon competition)	Florence Meiler	United States	7 June 1934	90	18 July 2024	Sacramento, United States	USATF Masters Championships	

=== 100 metres hurdles women ===
Age group	Record	Athlete	Nationality	Birthdate	Age	Date	Place	Meet	Ref.
W 35 (progression)
W 35 (progression)	12.40 (+1.2 m/s)	Gail Devers	United States	19 November 1966	35	2 July 2002	Lausanne, Switzerland	Athletissima	
W 35 (progression)	12.37 (+0.7 m/s)	Nia Ali	United States	23 October 1988	35	30 June 2024	Eugene, United States	USA Olympic trials	

=== 200 metres hurdles women ===
Age group	Record	Athlete	Nationality	Birthdate	Age	Date	Place	Meet	Ref.
W 70	36.71 (+0.7 m/s)	Marge Allison	Australia	13 September 1944	70	12 August 2015	Lyon France	World Masters Championships	
W 70	36.53 (+1.2 m/s)	Carol Davis	Australia	24 January 1951	70	7 March 2021	Brisbane Australia	Queensland Masters Championships	
W 75	39.89 (+0.0 m/s)	Christa Bortignon	Canada	29 January 1937	76	18 May 2013	Kamloops Canada	Kamloops Centennial Track and Field Meet	
W 80	42.24 (+1.2 m/s)	Irene Obera	United States	7 December 1933	80	20 July 2014	Winston-Salem United States	USATF Masters Championships	
W 85	1:42.04 (+0.4 m/s)	Tami Graf	United States	11 July 1936	85	25 July 2021	Ames United States	USATF Masters Championships	

=== 300 metres hurdles women ===
Age group	Record	Athlete	Nationality	Birthdate	Age	Date	Place	Meet	Ref.
W 50 (progression)	44.90	Barbara Gähling	Germany	20 January 1965	50	12 August 2015	Lyon, France	World Masters Championships	
W 55 (progression)	46.74	Barbara Gähling	Germany	20 January 1965	57	8 May 2022	Cologne, Germany	Hurdles/Sprints meeting	
W 60 (progression)	46.64	Barbara Gähling	Germany	20 January 1965	61	17 July 2026	Mönchengladbach, Germany	German Masters Championships	
W 65 (progression)	52.41	Jane Horder	Great Britain	18 January 1957	66	22 September 2023	Pescara, Italy	European Masters Championships	
W 65 (progression)	52.33 (Note: not ratified due to wrong hurdles height)	Jane Horder	Great Britain	18 January 1957	65	5 July 2022	Tampere, Finland	World Masters Championships	
event defunct, age group now doing 200 m officially
W 70	1:07.16	Florence Meiler	United States	1 June 1934	70	8 August 2004	Decatur, United States	USATF Masters Championships	
W 75	1:29.00	Johnnye Valien	United States	24 July 1925	76	25 July 2001	Brisbane, Australia	WAVA Championships	

=== 400 metres hurdles women ===
Age group	Record	Athlete	Nationality	Birthdate	Age	Date	Place	Meet	Ref.
W 35	52.58	Dalilah Muhammad	United States	7 February 1990	35	11 July 2025	Fontvieille, Monaco	Herculis	
W 40 (progression)	58.35	Barbara Gähling	Germany	20 January 1965	42	21 July 2007	Erfurt, Germany	German Championships	
W 40 (progression)	57.59	Elisabeth Slettum	Norway	31 August 1986	40	2 September 2026	Smederevo, Serbia	Continental Tour	
W 45 (progression)
W 45 (progression)	61.28	Barbara Gähling	Germany	20 January 1965	49	1 May 2014	Moers, Germany	Kreis Meisterschaften Lange Hürden	
W 45 (progression)	62.85	Barbara Gähling	Germany	20 January 1965	45	27 June 2010	Kaiserslautern, Germany	German Masters Championships	

=== 2000 metres steeplechase women ===
Age group	Record	Athlete	Nationality	Birthdate	Age	Date	Place	Meet	Ref.
W 35	6:27.11	Victoria Mitchell	Australia	25 April 1982	35	3 December 2017	Sydney, Australia	NSW Club & Combined Event Championships	
W 35	6:08.25	Emma Coburn	United States	19 October 1990	35	30 August 2026	Berlin,Germany	ISTAF Berlin	
W 40	6:49.58	Lisa Ryan	United States	6 November 1969	41	17 July 2011	Sacramento, United States	World Masters Championships	
W 40	6:46.15	Clarisse Pinho Cruz	Portugal	9 July 1978	42	8 August 2020	Lisbon, Portugal	Portuguese Championships	
W 45	6:50.81	Kirstie Booth (Note: by official result source; Kristie Booth by WMA source)	Great Britain	10 February 1978	45	15 July 2023	Yeovil, United Kingdom	National Athletics League Championship	
W 50	7:30.45	Nuria Etxegarai Carbajo	Spain	28 May 1973	52	20 June 2025	La Nucia, Spain	Spanish Masters Championships	
W 55	7:51.91	Lisa Margaret Thomas	Great Britain	31 March 1965	56	15 August 2021	Perivale, United Kingdom	Southern Athletics League	
W 60	8:16.93	Sue McDonald	United States	29 March 1963	60	15 October 2023	Montecito, United States	Club West Master's & Open Meet	
W 65	8:52.49	Kathryn Martin	United States	30 September 1951	65	12 August 2017	Toronto, Canada	NCCWMA	
W 70	9:46.79	Marlene Gourlay	Australia	7 October 1951	70	20 March 2022	Melbourne, Australia	Victorian Masters Championships	
W 70	9:43.19	Loris Reed	New Zealand	26 April 1947	70	12 November 2017	Timaru, New Zealand	South Island Masters Championships	
W 75	11:01.5 h	Gillian Young	Australia	21 July 1947	75	11 March 2023	Sydney, Australia	Australia Masters Championships	
W 80	13:38.34	Anne Martin	Great Britain	9 January 1936	80	6 November 2016	Perth, Australia	World Masters Championships	
W 80	12:26.27	Marie-Louise Michelsohn	United States	8 October 1941	80	17 October 2021	Santa Barbara, United States	Club West Masters Meet	
W 85	16:55.73	Anne Martin	Great Britain	9 January 1936	85	8 July 2022	Tampere, Finland	World Masters Championships	
W 90	20:54.78	Florence Meiler	United States	7 June 1934	91	18 July 2025	Huntsville, United States	USATF Masters Championships	

=== 3000 metres steeplechase women ===
Age group	Record	Athlete	Nationality	Birthdate	Age	Date	Place	Meet	Ref.
W 35	9:15.97	Emma Coburn	United States	19 October 1990	35	4 July 2026	Eugene,United States	Prefontaine Classic	
W 35	9:14.24	Alice Finot	France	9 February 1991	35	13 August 2026	Birmingham, United Kingdom	2026 European Athletics Championships	
W 40	10:00.75	Minori Hayakari	Japan	29 November 1972	40	22 November 2013	Kumagaya Japan	Japan Corporate Championships	
W 45	10:22.43	Minori Hayakari	Japan	29 November 1972	46	3 May 2019	Portland United States	Portland Track Festival	

=== High jump women ===
Age group	Record	Athlete	Nationality	Birthdate	Age	Date	Place	Meet	Ref.
W 35 (progression)	2.01	Inga Babakova	Ukraine	27 June 1967	35	27 June 2003	Oslo, Norway	Bislett Games	
W 35 (progression)	2.01	Ruth Beitia	Spain	1 April 1979	35	17 August 2014	Zurich, Switzerland	Weltklasse Zürich	
W 35 (progression)	2.01 i	Anna Chicherova	Russia	22 July 1982	36	17 January 2019	Chelyabinsk, Russia	Memorial Lukashevich & Seryodkin	
W 35 (progression)	2.01 i	Anna Chicherova	Russia	22 July 1982	36	20 January 2019	Moscow, Russia	Battle of the Sexes	
W 35 (progression)	2.02 i	Anna Chicherova	Russia	22 July 1982	36	15 February 2019	Moscow, Russia	Russian Indoor Championships	
W 40 (progression)	1.87	Iryna Mykhalchenko	Ukraine	20 January 1972	40	13 June 2012	Yalta, Ukraine	Ukrainian Championships	
W 40 (progression)	1.90	Venelina Veneva-Mateeva	Bulgaria	13 June 1974	40	12 July 2014; 26 July 2014	Plovdiv, Bulgaria; Pitesti, Romania	Memorial Vulpev; Balkan Championships	
W 40 (progression)	1.94 i	Venelina Veneva-Mateeva	Bulgaria	13 June 1974	40	15 February 2015	Dobrich, Bulgaria	National indoor Championships	
W 40 (progression)	1.94 i	Venelina Veneva-Mateeva	Bulgaria	13 June 1974	40	6 March 2015	Prague, Czech Republic	European Championships indoor	
W 45 (progression)	1.76	Debbie Brill	Canada	10 March 1953	46	6 August 1999	Gateshead, United Kingdom	WAVA Championships	
W 50 (progression)	1.68	Julia Machin	Great Britain	26 March 1970	51	31 May 2021	Bedford, United Kingdom	BIGish High Jump and Throws Fest	
W 50 (progression)	1.70	Julia Machin	Great Britain	26 March 1970	51	20 June 2021	Brighton, United Kingdom	Southern Athletics League - Sussex Coast	
W 55 (progression)	1.64	Julia Machin	Great Britain	26 March 1970	55	14 September 2025	Derby, United Kingdom	BMAF Championships	
W 60 (progression)	1.54	Barbara Gähling	Germany	20 January 1965	60	29 May 2025	Köln, Germany	Christi-Himmelfahrt-Sportfest	
W 65 (progression)	1.42	Weia Reinboud	Netherlands	11 March 1950	65	21 June 2015	Den Helder, Netherlands	SV Noordkop	
W 65 (progression)	1.44 i	Frauke Viebahn	Germany	26 November 1959	66	7 March 2026	Düsseldorf, Germany	DM Halle Masters	
W 70 (progression)	1.34	Weia Reinboud	Netherlands	11 March 1950	71	18 September 2021	Hengelo, Netherlands	Dutch Masters Championships	
W 75 (progression)	1.28	Weia Reinboud	Netherlands	11 March 1950	75	25 May 2025	Oosterhout, Netherlands	Masterscompetitie 1	
W 80 (progression)	1.18	Rietje Dijkman	Netherlands	21 June 1939	82	31 October 2021	Hilversum, Netherlands	Track and Field Meet	
W 80 (progression)	1.20 i	Kathy Bergen	United States	24 December 1939	80	16 February 2020	Houston, United States	Southwest Masters Championships indoor	
W 85 (progression)	1.05	Kathy Bergen	United States	24 December 1939	85	7 June 2025	Moorpark, United States	So Cal Jim Bush Championships	
W 90 (progression)	0.92 (Note: record set during decathlon competition)	Florence Meiler	United States	7 June 1934	90	22 June 2024	Charlottesville, United States	USATF Masters Multiple Events Championships	
W 95 (progression)	0.75	Olga Kotelko	Canada	2 March 1919	95	18 May 2014	Kamloops, Canada	Kamloops Centennial Meet	
W 95 (progression)	0.78 i	Olga Kotelko	Canada	2 March 1919	95	26 March 2014	Budapest, Hungary	World Masters Indoor Championships	

=== Pole vault women ===
Age group	Record	Athlete	Nationality	Birthdate	Age	Date	Place	Meet	Ref.
W 35 (progression)	4.91	Jennifer Suhr	United States	4 February 1982	37	31 March 2019	Austin, United States	Texas Relays	
W 35 (progression)	4.93	Jennifer Suhr	United States	4 February 1982	36	14 April 2018	Austin, United States	Texas invitational	
W 40 (progression)	4.15	Carolin Hingst	Germany	18 September 1980	42	21 May 2023	Diefflen, Germany	Stabhochsprung auf dem Dorfplatz	
W 40 (progression)	4.50	Jennifer Suhr	United States	4 February 1982	40	2 April 2022	Waco, United States	Baylor invitational	
W 40 (progression)	4.60	Jennifer Suhr	United States	4 February 1982	40	23 April 2022	Natchitoches, United States	Leon Johnson Invitational	
W 45 (progression)	3.77	Elisabete Ribeiro Tavares	France	7 March 1980	46	23 May 2026	Tremblay, France	Championnats Zone 93 Individuels	
W 50 (progression)	3.46	Irie Hill	Great Britain	16 January 1969	50	28 September 2019	Holzgerlingen, Germany	Holzgerlinger pole vault meeting	
W 50 (progression)	3.51 i	Irie Hill	Great Britain	16 January 1969	50	30 March 2019	Toruń, Poland	World Masters Indoor Championships	
W 55 (progression)	3.26	Dawn Hartigan	Australia	13 November 1956	56	23 March 2013	Melbourne, Australia	Rare Air Club Meet	
W 55 (progression)	3.30 i	Irie Hill	Great Britain	16 January 1969	55	20 March 2024	Toruń, Poland	European Masters Indoor Championships	
W 60 (progression)	3.12	Nadine O'Connor	United States	5 March 1942	64	22 July 2006	Long Beach United States	USATF West Region	
W 65 (progression)	3.19	Nadine O'Connor	United States	5 March 1942	67	17 July 2009	San Diego United States	San Diego Night Vaults	
W 70 (progression)	2.95	Nadine O'Connor	United States	5 March 1942	70	13 July 2012	San Diego United States	San Diego Night Vaults	
W 75 (progression)	2.03	Florence Meiler	United States	7 June 1934	76	4 July 2010	Valatie United States	East Regional Championships	
W 80 (progression)	1.83	Florence Meiler	United States	7 June 1934	80	21 June 2014	Albany United States	USATF East Region Championships	
W 85	1.55	Florence Meiler	United States	7 June 1934	85	20 June 2019	Albuquerque, United States	National Senior Games	
W 85	1.65 i	Florence Meiler	United States	7 June 1934	85	26 January 2020	Providence, United States	New England Masters Championships indoor	
W 90	1.30	Florence Meiler	United States	7 June 1934	91	20 July 2025	Huntsville, United States	USATF National Masters Championships	
W 90	1.37 i	Florence Meiler	United States	7 June 1934	90	29 March 2025	Gainesville, United States	World Masters Indoor Championships	

=== Long jump women ===
Age group	Record	Athlete	Nationality	Birthdate	Age	Date	Place	Meet	Ref.
W 35 (progression)	6.99 (+1.9 m/s)	Heike Drechsler	Germany	16 December 1964	35	29 September 2000	Sydney, Australia	Olympic Games	
W 40 (progression)	6.55 (+1.2 m/s)	Tatyana Ter-Mesrobyan	Russia	12 May 1968	40	18 July 2008	Kazan, Russia	Russian Championships (q)	
W 40 (progression)	6.64 i	Tatyana Ter-Mesrobyan	Russia	12 May 1968	41	5 January 2010	Saint Petersburg, Russia	St Petersburg Cup	
W 40 (progression)	6.63 (+1.7 m/s)	Tatyana Ter-Mesrobyan	Russia	12 May 1968	44	26 June 2012	Saint Petersburg, Russia		
W 45 (progression)	5.71 (±0.0 m/s)	Melissa Foster	Australia	8 September 1978	45	25 February 2024	Perth, Australia	Western State Championships	
W 45 (progression)	5.75 i	Philipa Raschker	United States	21 February 1947	47	5 March 1994	Chicago, United States		
W 45 (progression)	5.82 (+0.2 m/s)	Tatyana Ter-Mesrobyan	Russia	12 May 1968	45	22 July 2013	Moscow, Russia	Russian Championships (q)	
W 50 (progression)	5.89 (+0.4 m/s)	Sandrine Hennart	Belgium	12 December 1972	53	12 July 2026	Braine-l'Alleud, Belgium	Allianz Championnats LBFA	
W 55 (progression)	5.46 (−1.5 m/s)	Renata Novosel	Croatia	28 November 1967	55	8 July 2023	Varaždin, Croatia	National Masters Championships	
W 60 (progression)	5.07	Petra Bajeat	France	6 March 1966	60	13 June 2026	Epinal, France	France Masters Championships	
W 65 (progression)	4.64 (+0.8 m/s)	Christiane Schmalbruch	Germany	8 January 1937	65	16 August 2002	Potsdam, Germany	European Masters Championships	
W 70 (progression)	4.26 (+1.9 m/s)	Carol LaFayette-Boyd	Canada	17 May 1942	70	10 August 2012	Saint John, Canada	NCCWMA	
W 75 (progression)	4.09 (+0.1 m/s)	Carol LaFayette-Boyd	Canada	17 May 1942	75	12 August 2017	Toronto, Canada	NCCWMA	
W 80 (progression)	3.69 (+0.9 m/s)	Carol LaFayette-Boyd	Canada	17 May 1942	80	30 July 2022	Regina, Canada	National Masters Championships	
W 85 (progression)	3.11 (−0.7 m/s)	Christa Bortignon	Canada	29 January 1937	86	24 August 2023	Abbotsford, Canada	British Columbia 55+ track & field	
W 90	2.54 (+1.7 m/s)	Rosa Pedersen	Denmark	25 February 1930	91	8 June 2021	Odense, Denmark	Master holdturnering	
W 90	2.60 (+1.3 m/s)	Rosa Pedersen	Denmark	25 February 1930	90	23 June 2020	Odense, Denmark		
W 95	1.28 (+1.5 m/s)	Olga Kotelko	Canada	2 March 1919	95	17 May 2014	Kamloops, Canada	Kamloops Centennial Meet	
W 95	1.57 i	Olga Kotelko	Canada	2 March 1919	95	27 March 2014	Budapest, Hungary	World Masters Athletics Championships indoor	

=== Triple jump women ===
Age group	Record	Athlete	Nationality	Birthdate	Age	Date	Place	Meet	Ref.
W 35 (progression)	14.73 (+0.5 m/s)	Caterine Ibarguen	Colombia	14 February 1984	35	5 October 2019	Doha Qatar	World Championships	
W 35 (progression)	14.89 (+0.0 m/s)	Caterine Ibarguen	Colombia	14 February 1984	35	5 July 2019	Lausanne Switzerland	Athletissima	
W 35 (progression)	14.79 (−0.2 m/s)	Caterine Ibarguen	Colombia	14 February 1984	35	13 June 2019	Oslo Norway	Bislett Games	
W 35 (progression)	14.82 i	Yamilé Aldama	Great Britain	14 August 1972	39	10 March 2012	Istanbul Turkey	World Championships	
W 40 (progression)	14.06 (+1.5 m/s)	Yamilé Aldama	Great Britain	14 August 1972	40	1 June 2013	Eugene United States	Prefontaine Classic	
W 45 (progression)	12.30 (+0.1 m/s)	Barbara Lah	Italy	24 March 1972	45	11 May 2019	San Biagio di Callalta Italy	Italian Athletics Clubs Championships	
W 45 (progression)	12.75 (+1.1 m/s)	Tatyana Ter-Mesrobyan	Russia	12 May 1968	45	10 July 2013	Saint Petersburg Russia	Saint Petersburg Championships	
W 45 (progression)	12.42 (+1.0 m/s)	Murielle Glovil	France	7 July 1968	45	18 May 2014	Aix les Bains France	Clubs Championships	
W 45 (progression)	12.39 (±0.0 m/s)	Murielle Glovil	France	7 July 1968	47	27 June 2015	Amiens France	National Meet	
W 50 (progression)	11.66	Akiko Ohinata	Japan	14 December 1949	54	8 August 2004	Shikishima Japan	Gunma Masters Championships	
W 50 (progression)	11.69 i	Andrea Szirbucz	Hungary	7 May 1972	50	30 March 2023	Toruń Poland	World Masters Indoor Championships	
W 55 (progression)	10.97	Akiko Ohinata	Japan	14 December 1949	56	25 June 2006	Kōfu, Japan	Yamanashi Masters Championships	
W 55 (progression)	11.09 i	Neringa Jakstiene	United States	18 October 1963	55	28 March 2019	Toruń, Poland	World Masters Championships indoor	
W 60 (progression)	11.04 (+1.0 m/s)	Akiko Ohinata	Japan	14 December 1949	60	6 June 2010	Tajimi, Japan	Tokai Masters Championships	
W 65 (progression)	10.12 (+1.9 m/s)	Petra Herrmann	Germany	2 September 1959	65	28 September 2024	Neukieritzsch, Germany	Landesoffener Bahnabschluss	
W 70 (progression)	8.98 (−0.3 m/s)	Akiko Ohinata	Japan	14 December 1949	71	1 May 2021	Tajimi, Japan	Gifu Masters Championships	
W 75 (progression)	8.48 (+1.5 m/s)	Akiko Ohinata	Japan	14 December 1949	75	24 August 2025	Fukui City, Japan	Fukui Masters Championships	
W 80 (progression)	7.45 (−3.0 m/s)	Carol LaFayette-Boyd	Canada	17 May 1942	80	17 July 2022	Saskatoon, Canada	Saskatchewan Championships	
W 80 (progression)	7.66 i	Carol LaFayette-Boyd	Canada	17 May 1942	80	3 February 2023	Regina, Canada	Regina Indoor Games	
W 85 (progression)	6.62 (±0.0 m/s)	Christa Bortignon	Canada	29 January 1937	86	25 August 2023	Abbotsford, Canada	British Columbia 55+ track & field	
W 90	4.55 (±0.0 m/s)	Florence Meiler	United States	7 June 1934	91	1 August 2025	Ames, United States	National Senior Games	
W 95	3.37 (+0.4 m/s)	Olga Kotelko	Canada	2 March 1919	95	18 May 2014	Kamloops, Canada	Kamloops Centennial Meet	
W 95	3.68 i	Olga Kotelko	Canada	2 March 1919	95	29 March 2014	Budapest, Hungary	World Masters Athletics Championships indoor	

=== Shot put women ===
Age group	Record	Athlete	Nationality	Birthdate	Age	Date	Place	Meet	Ref.
W 35 (progression)	21.46	Larisa Peleshenko	Russia	29 February 1964	36	26 August 2000	Moscow, Russia	Memorial Kuts	
W 35 (progression)	21.47 i	Helena Fibingerová	Czech Republic	13 July 1949	35	9 February 1985	Jablonec nad Nisou, Czechoslovakia	National Championships	
W 40 (progression)	19.05	Antonina Ivanova	Soviet Union	25 December 1932	40	23 August 1973	Orel, Soviet Union		
W 40 (progression)	19.16 i	Antonina Ivanova	Soviet Union	25 December 1932	41	24 February 1974	Moscow, Russia		
W 45 (progression)	16.95	Zdeňka Šilhavá	Czech Republic	15 June 1954	45	26 June 1999	Ostrava, Czechoslovakia	National Championships	
W 50 (progression)	15.15	Alexandra Marghieva	Moldova	27 June 1959	50	4 August 2009	Lahti, Finland	World Masters Championships	
W 50 (progression)	15.17 i	Alexandra Marghieva	Moldova	27 June 1959	51	18 March 2011	Ghent, Belgium	European Masters Championships Indoor	
W 55 (progression)	14.47	Sigrin Kofink	Germany	23 April 1935	56	21 July 1991	Turku, Finland	WAVA Championships	
W 55 (progression)	14.53 i	Mihaela Loghin	Romania	1 June 1952	58	18 March 2011	Ghent, Belgium	European Masters Championships Indoor	
W 60 (progression)	13.68	Mihaela Loghin	Romania	1 June 1952	60	9 June 2012	Bucharest, Romania	National Masters Championships	
W 60 (progression)	13.70 i	Mihaela Loghin	Romania	1 June 1952	62	23 March 2015	Toruń, Poland	European Masters Championships Indoor	
W 65 (progression)	13.36	Mihaela Loghin	Romania	1 June 1952	65	1 July 2017	Bucharest, Romania	National Masters Championships	
W 70 (progression)	11.32	Monica Kendall	United States	24 December 1955	70	19 July 2026	Geneva, United States	USATF Masters Championships	
W 75 (progression)	12.12	Marianne Maier	Austria	25 December 1942	75	4 September 2018	Málaga, Spain	World Masters Championships	
W 75 (progression)	12.29	Marianne Maier	Austria	25 December 1942	77	5 September 2020	Götzis, Austria	Internationale VLV Masters Stadionmeisterschaften	
W 80	10.67	Marianne Maier	Austria	25 December 1942	81	8 June 2024	Höchst, Austria	Internationale Meeting Open	
W 80	10.84 i	Marianne Maier	Austria	25 December 1942	82	22 February 2025	Dornbirn, Austria	VLV Masters Meet	
W 85	9.42	Evaun B. Williams	Great Britain	19 December 1937	85	17 August 2024	Gothenburg, Sweden	World Masters Championships	
W 90	6.58 (Note: record set during pentathlon competition)	Myrtle Acton	Canada	9 October 1932	90	11 August 2023	Langley, Canada	Canada Masters Championships	
W 90	6.82	Nora Kutti	Estonia	9 October 1922	90	15 June 2013	Vändra, Estonia		
W 95	5.32	Gabre Gabric	Italy	14 October 1914	95	17 July 2010	Nyíregyháza, Hungary	European Masters Championships	
W 100
W 100	4.48	Ruth Frith	Australia	23 August 1909	100	21 March 2010	Nathan, Australia	Queensland Open and Masters Championships	
W 100	4.10	Ruth Frith	Australia	23 August 1909	100	22 August 2010	Southport, Australia	QMA Coastal South Throws Pentathlon	

=== Discus throw women ===
Age group	Record	Athlete	Nationality	Birthdate	Age	Date	Place	Meet	Ref.
W 35 (progression)	69.60	Faina Melnik	Soviet Union	9 July 1945	35	9 September 1980	Donetsk, Soviet Union	Soviet Championships	
W 40 (progression)	67.89	Iryná Yatchenko	Belarus	31 October 1965	42	29 June 2008	Minsk, Belarus		
W 45 (progression)	65.96	Mélina Robert-Michon	France	18 July 1979	46	9 April 2026	Ramona, United States	Oklahoma Throws Series	
W 50 (progression)	46.11	Olga Chernyavskaya	Russia	17 September 1963	51	11 August 2015	Lyon, France	World Masters Championships	
W 50 (progression)	48.98	Olga Chernyavskaya	Russia	17 September 1963	51	11 February 2015	Adler, Russia	Memorial Lunyov	
W 50 (progression)	48.06	Odette Domingos	Brazil	5 September 1934	52	23 June 1987	São Paulo, Brazil		
W 55 (progression)	43.36	Tamara Danilova	Russia	30 July 1939	57	10 August 1996	Prien am Chiemsee, Germany		
W 60 (progression)	40.76	Carol Finsrud	United States	20 February 1957	60	14 October 2017	San Marcos, United States	Texas vs The World Championships	
W 65 (progression)	37.62	Tamara Danilova	Russia	30 July 1939	66	28 August 2005	San Sebastián, Spain	World Masters Championships	
W 70 (progression)	33.55	Tamara Danilova	Russia	30 July 1939	70	21 July 2010	Nyíregyháza, Hungary	European Veterans Championships	
W 70 (progression)	33.80	Tamara Danilova	Russia	30 July 1939	70	6 August 2009	Lahti, Finland	World Masters Championships	
W 75 (progression)	31.56	Tamara Danilova	Russia	30 July 1939	76	16 October 2015	Nice, France	European Masters Games	
W 75 (progression)	32.09	Tamara Danilova	Russia	30 July 1939	76	28 August 2015	Chelyabinsk, Russia	Russian Masters Championships	
W 80 (progression)	26.53	Anne Chatrine Rühlow	Germany	30 September 1936	80	25 May 2017	Paderborn, Germany	Offene Westfälische Masters Championships	
W 85	22.42	Evaun B. Williams	Great Britain	19 December 1937	86	18 August 2024	Gothenburg, Sweden	World Masters Championships	
W 90	15.83	Myrtle Acton	Canada	9 October 1932	90	24 August 2023	Abbotsford, Canada	British Columbia 55+ Games	
W 95	12.86	Gabre Gabric	Italy	14 October 1914	95	21 July 2010	Nyíregyháza, Hungary	European Veterans Championships	
W 100	9.30	Ruth Frith	Australia	23 August 1909	101	2 April 2011	Brisbane, Australia	QMA Championships (in throws pentathlon)	

=== Hammer throw women ===
Age group	Record	Athlete	Nationality	Birthdate	Age	Date	Place	Meet	Ref.
W 35 (progression)	78.48	Anita Wlodarczyk	Poland	8 August 1985	35	3 August 2021	Tokyo, Japan	Olympic Games	
W 40	75.01	Anita Wlodarczyk	Poland	8 August 1985	40	16 July 2026	Madrid, Spain	Madrid Meeting	
W 45	56.21	Oneithea Lewis	United States	11 June 1960	45	16 July 2005	Denver, United States	Long & Strong Throwers Classic	
W 45	65.99	Yipsi Moreno	Albania	19 November 1980	45	2 September 2026	Taranto, Italy	Mediterranean Games	
W 50	55.57	Angela Herzner	United States	15 August 1974	50	21 June 2025	Mesa, United States	Rise and Shine All Comers	
W 55	51.30	Marja Leena Parviainen	Australia	29 July 1944	58	10 October 2002	Melbourne, Australia	World Masters Games	
W 60 (progression)	47.38	Gonny Mik	Netherlands	23 May 1965	61	5 June 2026	Vught, Netherlands	Netherlands National Masters Championships	
W 65	44.38	Jutta Schäfer	Germany	17 October 1931	65	17 August 1997	Schweinfurt, Germany	Germany Masters Championships	
W 65	44.87	Jutta Schäfer	Germany	17 October 1931	65	13 September 1997	Augsburg, Germany	DRTV throws multiple events	
W 70	39.24	Eva Nohl	Germany	27 November 1948	70	3 October 2019	Effeltrich, Germany	Pantel Rasenkraftsport Dreikampf	
W 75	42.99	Myrle Mensey	United States	13 February 1949	75	10 August 2024	Ladue, United States	Ladue throws competition	
W 80	37.85	Evaun B. Williams	Great Britain	19 December 1937	80	12 September 2018	Málaga, Spain	World Masters Championships	
W 85	31.11 (Note: record set during Throws Pentathlon competition)	Evaun B. Williams	Great Britain	19 December 1937	85	26 September 2023	Pescara, Italy	European Masters Championships	
W 90	20.47 (Note: record set during pentathlon competition)	Myrtle Acton	Canada	9 October 1932	90	11 August 2023	Langley, Canada	Canada Masters Championships	
W 95	14.92	Olga Kotelko	Canada	2 March 1919	95	16 May 2014	Kamloops, Canada	Kamloops Centennial Meet	
W 100	11.30	Ruth Frith	Australia	23 August 1909	101	10 October 2010	Turner, Australia	Australian Masters Winter Throws Championships	

=== Javelin throw women ===
Effective the 2014 season, WMA increased the weight of the javelin for women 60–75. Until the records of the lighter implements are surpassed, two records are officially kept.

Age group	Record	Athlete	Nationality	Birthdate	Age	Date	Place	Meet	Ref.
W 35 (progression)	68.92	Kathryn Mitchell	Australia	10 July 1982	35	11 April 2018	Gold Coast, Australia	Commonwealth Games	
W 40 (progression)	63.08	Barbora Špotáková	Czech Republic	30 June 1981	40	9 July 2021	Monaco	Herculis	
W 45 (progression)	50.47	Elisabeth Wahlander	Sweden	14 March 1960	45	21 August 2005	Helsingborg, Sweden	Swedish Championships	
W 45 (progression)	54.29	Barbora Špotáková	Czech Republic	30 June 1981	45	19 August 2026	Kolin,Czech Republic	90° Kolín Gran Prix	
W 45 (progression)	54.56	Indrė Jakubaitytė	Lithuania	24 January 1976	45	20 May 2021	Birštonas, Lithuania	Throws Meeting	
W 45 (progression)	55.69	Indrė Jakubaitytė	Lithuania	24 January 1976	46	12 June 2022	Klaipėda, Lithuania	Masters Cup Competition	
W 50 (progression)	47.53	Felicia Ureche	Spain	29 September 1967	50	24 March 2018	Madrid, Spain	European Masters Championships	
W 55 (progression)	44.44	Natasa Bezjak	Slovenia	25 November 1945	56	21 August 2002	Potsdam, Germany	European Masters Championships	
W 60; 500g (progression)	41.14	Genowefa Patla	Poland	17 October 1962	60	29 March 2023	Toruń, Poland	World Masters Indoor Championships	
W 60; 400g (progression)	41.28	Gertraud Schönauer	Austria	27 February 1937	60	12 July 1997	Dasing, Germany	World Masters Championships	
W 65; 500g (progression)	37.32	Linda Cohn	United States	7 December 1952	65	13 April 2018	Cerritos, United States	Twilight Open Meet	
W 65; 400g (progression)	38.07	Evaun B. Williams	Great Britain	19 December 1937	68	27 July 2006	Poznań, Poland	European Masters Championships	
W 70; 500g (progression)	34.83	Vanda Srbová Marušová	Czech Republic	8 December 1953	70	22 May 2024	Kladno, Czech Republic	Kladno hází a Kladenské Memoriály	
W 75 (progression)	29.92	Evaun B. Williams	Great Britain	19 December 1937	75	22 October 2013	Porto Alegre, Brazil	World Masters Championships	
W 80 (progression)	27.51	Evaun B. Williams	Great Britain	19 December 1937	80	27 March 2019	Toruń, Poland	World Masters Indoor Championships	
W 85 (progression)	24.78	Evaun B. Williams	Great Britain	19 December 1937	86	19 August 2024	Gothenburg, Sweden	World Masters Championships	
W 90	16.98	Harriet Bloemker	United States	14 April 1932	90	16 July 2022	Lincoln, United States	Cornhusker State Games	
W 95	11.24	Olga Kotelko	Canada	2 March 1919	95	29 March 2014	Budapest, Hungary	World Masters Indoor Championships	
W 100	6.43	Ruth Frith	Australia	23 August 1909	100	23 August 2009	Southport, Australia	Trans Tasman Masters Throws Pentathlon	

=== Weight throw women ===
Age group	Record	Athlete	Nationality	Birthdate	Age	Date	Place	Meet	Ref.
W 35	19.27	Vania Silva	Portugal	8 June 1980	38	14 July 2018	Leiria, Portugal	International Throws Meet	
W 35	23.48 i A	Amber Campbell	United States	5 June 1981	35	4 March 2017	Albuquerque, United States	USA Championships	
W 40	19.09	Oneithea Lewis	United States	11 June 1960	42	28 September 2002	Newark, United States	Delaware Fall Throwers Classic	
W 40	19.40	Vania Silva	Portugal	8 June 1980	40	29 July 2020	Leiria, Portugal	Desafio Mundial de Masters Virtuais de 2020	
W 45	17.88	Oneithea Lewis	United States	11 June 1960	45	13 August 2005	Arlington, United States	USA National Masters Championships Throws Pentathlon	
W 50	18.76	Oneithea Lewis	United States	11 June 1960	51	11 July 2011	Sacramento, United States	World Masters Championships	
W 55	17.50	Gonny Mik	Netherlands	23 March 1965	55	29 July 2020	Dissen, Germany	Senioren-Werfertag	
W 60	18.90	Mirja Kokko	Finland	8 August 1961	60	29 May 2022	Kouvola, Finland	Throws Meet (HT and WT)	
W 65	17.34	Annie van Anholt	Netherlands	22 February 1947	67	22 March 2014	Roermond, Netherlands		
W 70	16.15	Dorn Jenkins	Australia	4 August 1955	70	6 September 2025	Brisbane, Australia	Oceania Masters Championships	
W 75	16.34	Myrle Mensey	United States	13 February 1949	76	19 July 2025	Huntsville, United States	USATF Masters Championships	
W 75	16.59	Myrle Mensey	United States	13 February 1949	75	2 March 2024	Indianapolis, United States	USATF Midwest Masters Championships	
W 80	13.84	Kirsti Viitanen	Finland	21 August 1942	80	6 August 2023 (Note: 6 August 2024 by WMA source, probably false)	Lahti, Finland	Masters Throws Meet	
W 85	11.97	Evaun B. Williams	Great Britain	19 December 1937	86	22 August 2024	Gothenburg, Sweden	World Masters Championships	
W 90	8.57	Rosa Pedersen	Denmark	25 February 1930	92	27 August 2022	Ballerup, Denmark	NC Denmark Masters	
W 90	8.82	Hilja Bakhoff	Estonia	23 December 1926	90	18 February 2017	Viljandi, Estonia	Throws Pentathlon Masters	
W 95	6.72	Olga Kotelko	Canada	2 March 1919	95	15 June 2014	Langley, Canada	Langley Pacific Invitational	
W 95	6.97 i	Olga Kotelko	Canada	2 March 1919	95	30 March 2014	Budapest, Hungary	World Masters Championships indoor	
W 100	4.68	Ruth Frith	Australia	23 August 1909	101	2 April 2011	Brisbane, Australia	QMA Championships Throws Pentathlon	
W 100	4.88	Ruth Frith	Australia	23 August 1909	100	12 October 2009	Sydney, Australia	World Masters Games	

=== Throws pentathlon women ===
Note: per 1-1-2023 new scorings are in use, scorings from 2010/2014 are given between brackets. Effective the 2014 season, WMA had increased the weight of the javelin for women 60–75. Per 2023 records with old implements are no longer official.

Age group	Record	Athlete	Nationality	Birthdate	Age	Date	Place	Meet	Ref.
W 35	3944	Rachel Andres	Canada	21 April 1987	37	31 August 2024	Calgary, Canada	Calgary Throws Festival	
W 35		Hammer / Shot put / Discus / Javelin / Weight; 46.51m / 14.55m / 55.90m / 35.78m / 16.59m							
W 40	4260 A (old: 4841 A)	Oneithea Lewis	United States	11 June 1960	43	23 August 2003	Fort Collins, United States	USA Masters Throws Pentathlon Championships	
W 40		Hammer / Shot put / Discus / Javelin / Weight; 53.30m / 14.39m / 45.26m / 32.97m / 18.16m							
W 45	4222 (old: 4683)	Carol Finsrud	United States	20 February 1957	47	14 August 2004	Reading, United States	USA Masters Throws Pentathlon Championships	
W 45		Hammer / Shot put / Discus / Javelin / Weight; 42.55m / 13.05m / 50.04m / 32.15m / 14.41m							
W 45	4206 (old: 4752)	Oneithea Lewis	United States	11 June 1960	45	13 August 2005	Arlington, United States	USA Masters Throws Pentathlon Championships	
W 45		Hammer / Shot put / Discus / Javelin / Weight; 47.21m / 13.51m / 37.09m / 28.97m / 17.88m							
W 50	4088	Angela Herzner	United States	15 August 1974	50	21 June 2025	Mesa, United States	Rise and Shine All Comers	
W 50		Hammer / Shot put / Discus / Javelin / Weight; 55.57m / 13.78m / 35.94m / 22.62m / 16.96m							
W 55	4241e (old: 4896)	Evaun B. Williams	Great Britain	19 December 1937	56	11 June 1994	Athens, Greece	European Veterans Championships	
W 55		Hammer / Shot put / Discus / Javelin / Weight; 43.50m / 12.13m / 27.38m / 36.22m* / 17.02m; * 400g javelin							
W 60	4450	Donna Beard	United States	15 October 1963	61	3 October 2025	Las Vegas, United States	Silver State Games	
W 60		Hammer / Shot put / Discus / Javelin / Weight; 43.41 m / 11.51 m / 34.22 m / 33.32 m / 13.40 m							
W 65	4780 (old: 5419)	Ann Kirstine Jensen	Denmark	20 June 1954	65	7 July 2019	Silkeborg, Denmark	Denmark Throws Pentathlon Championships	
W 65		Hammer / Shot put / Discus / Javelin / Weight; 38.02m / 11.25m / 31.51m / 32.28m / 14.16m							
W 70; 400g javelin	4967 (old: 5683)	Evaun B. Williams	Great Britain	19 December 1937	70	2 August 2008	Ljubljana, Slovenia	European Masters Championships	
W 70; 400g javelin		Hammer / Shot put / Discus / Javelin / Weight; 37.40m / 9.79m / 27.17m / 31.47m / 13.80m; *Note: 400g Javelin							
W 70; 500g javelin	4163 (old: 4826)	Myrle Mensey	United States	13 February 1949	70	3 August 2019	Lisle, United States	USATF Masters Throws Pentathlon Championships	
W 70; 500g javelin		Hammer / Shot put / Discus / Javelin / Weight; 36.38 / 8.48 / 23.49 / 16.06 / 14.31							
W 75	4465 (old: 5528)	Evaun B. Williams	Great Britain	19 December 1937	75	25 October 2013	Porto Alegre, Brazil	World Masters Championships	
W 75		Hammer / Shot put / Discus / Javelin / Weight; 36.61m / 10.45m / 26.75m / 24.73m / 12.43m							
W 80	4932 (old: 6080)	Evaun B. Williams	Great Britain	19 December 1937	80	12 September 2018	Málaga, Spain	World Masters Championships	
W 80		Hammer / Shot put / Discus / Javelin / Weight; 37.85m / 9.23m / 23.00m / 24.65m / 12.68m							
W 85	5150 (Note: by official result source; 5151 by WMA source) (old 6316)	Evaun B. Williams	Great Britain	19 December 1937	85	26 September 2023	Pescara, Italy (Note: by official result source; İzmir, Turkey by WMA source, a typo)	European Masters Championships	
W 85		Hammer / Shot put / Discus / Javelin / Weight; 31.11m / 8.65m / 20.81m / 20.96m / 11.59m							
W 90	3975	Myrtle Acton	Canada	9 October 1932	90	11 August 2023	Langley, Canada	Canada Masters Championships	
W 90		Hammer / Shot put / Discus / Javelin / Weight; 20.47m / 6.58m / 15.21m / 11.59m / 6.95m							
W 95	3967 (old: 5016)	Olga Kotelko	Canada	2 March 1919	95	16 May 2014	Kamloops, Canada	Kamloops Centennial Meet	
W 95		Hammer / Shot put / Discus / Javelin / Weight; 14.92m / 4.91m / 11.75m / 9.64m / 6.41m							
W 100	3832 (old: 5180)	Ruth Frith	Australia	23 August 1909	101	2 April 2011	Brisbane, Australia	QMA Throws Pentathlon Championships	
W 100		Hammer / Shot put / Discus / Javelin / Weight; 10.14m / 3.96m / 9.30m / 5.63m / 4.68m							
W 100	3916 (old: 5363)	Ruth Frith	Australia	23 August 1909	100	23 August 2009	Gold Coast, Australia	Trans Tasman Masters Throws Pentathlon	
W 100		Hammer / Shot put / Discus / Javelin / Weight; 10.16m / 4.27m / 9.04m / 6.43m / 4.42m							

=== Heptathlon women ===
Note: per 1-1-2023 new scorings are in use, scorings from 2010/2014 are given between brackets. Effective the 2014 season, WMA had increased the weight of the javelin for women 60–75. Per 2023 records with old implements are no longer official.

Age group	Record	Athlete	Nationality	Birthdate	Age	Date	Place	Meet	Ref.
W 35	6622 (old: 6860)	Sabine Braun	Germany	19 June 1965	37	10 August 2002	Munich, Germany	European Championships	
W 35		100m H (wind) / High jump / Shot put / 200m (wind) / Long jump (wind) / Javelin / 800m; 13.58 (−0.3 m/s) / 1.80 m / 14.56 m / 24.69 (−0.1 m/s) / 6.50 m (+1.9 m/s) / 51.23 m / 2:23.24							
W 40	5964	Beatrice Puiu	Romania	22 March 1986	40	25 August 2026	Daegu, South Korea	World Masters Championships	
W 40		80m H (wind) / High jump / Shot put / 200m (wind) / Long jump (wind) / Javelin / 800m; 11.30 (+0.9 m/s) / 1.68 m / 13.35 m / 26.56 (−0.1 m/s) / 5.42 m (−0.1 m/s) / 34.94 m / 2:35.55							
W 45	5856 (old: 6082)	Tatjana Schilling	Germany	5 October 1970	48	8 September 2019	Caorle, Italy	European Masters Championships	
W 45		80m H (wind) / High jump / Shot put / 200m (wind) / Long jump (wind) / Javelin / 800m; 12.34 (+0.1 m/s) / 1.60 m / 10.86 m / 27.05 (−1.4 m/s) / 5.26 m (+0.6 m/s) / 31.06 m / 2:38.83							
W 50	6165	Tatjana Schilling	Germany	5 October 1970	52	24 September 2023	Pescara, Italy	European Masters Championships	
W 50		80m H (wind) / High jump / Shot put / 200m (wind) / Long jump (wind) / Javelin / 800m; 12.87 (−0.1 m/s) / 1.54 m / 12.28 m / 27.10 (+1.1 m/s) / 5.05 m (+0.3 m/s) / 32.25 m / 2:38.54							
W 55	6420	Tatjana Schilling	Germany	5 October 1970	55	12 October 2025	Madeira, Portugal	European Masters Championships	
W 55		80m H (wind) / High jump / Shot put / 200m (wind) / Long jump (wind) / Javelin / 800m; 13.11 (−2.2 m/s) / 1.50 m / 10.85 m / 27.99 (−1.1 m/s) / 4.78 m (+1.0 m/s) / 33.35 m / 2:41.61							
W 60	6826	Barbara Gähling	Germany	20 January 1965	60	9 June 2025	Limburgerhof, Germany	33. Nationale Pfingst-Mehrkämpfe Limburgerhof	
W 60		80m H (wind) / High jump / Shot put / 200m (wind) / Long jump (wind) / Javelin / 800m; 13.51 (+2.4 m/s) / 1.48 m / 12.40 m / 29.27 (+1.0 m/s) / 4.26 m (−0.5 m/s) / 32.24 m / 2:41.03							
W 65	5788	Maria Rosa Escribano Cecha	Spain	29 December 1958	65	14 July 2024	Tarragona, Spain	Campionat de Catalunya Master Multiple Events	
W 65		80m H (wind) / High jump / Shot put / 200m (wind) / Long jump (wind) / Javelin / 800m; 14.42 (±0.0 m/s) / 1.33 m / 8.82 m / 33.35 (+0.9 m/s) / 3.95 m (±0.0 m/s) / 21.45 m / 3:03.29							
W 70	5444 (old: 6375)	Carol Davis	Australia	24 January 1951	70	7 February 2021	Brisbane, Australia	QMA Combined Event Championships	
W 70		80m H (wind) / High jump / Shot put / 200m (wind) / Long jump (wind) / Javelin / 800m; 16.98 (−1.6 m/s) / 1.14 m / 6.55 m / 32.96 (±0.0 m/s) / 3.68 m (−0.1 m/s) / 19.96 m / 3:05.52							
W 75	5436 (old: 6870)	Riet Jonkers	Netherlands	4 October 1943	75	2 June 2019	Stendal, Germany	Stendaler Hanse-Cup	
W 75		80m H (wind) / High jump / Shot put / 200m (wind) / Long jump (wind) / Javelin / 800m; 17.73 (+0.1 m/s) / 1.12 m / 8.49 m / 35.32 (+0.3 m/s) / 3.24 m (+1.5 m/s) / 15.31 m / 3:12.73							
W 80	4142 (old: 6071)	Irene Obera	United States	7 December 1933	82	29 October 2016	Perth, Australia	World Masters Championships	
W 80		80m H (wind) / High jump / Shot put / 200m (wind) / Long jump (wind) / Javelin / 800m; 20.44 (+2.0 m/s) / 0.95 m / 6.65 m / 44.68 (−0.2 m/s) / 2.79 m (+0.4 m/s) / 17.41 m / 4:54.65							
W 85	3631 (old: 5807)	Christa Bortignon	Canada	29 January 1937	85	27 August 2022	Surrey, Canada	Greyhounds Masters Multi-Events Meet	
W 85		80m H (wind) / High jump / Shot put / 200m (wind) / Long jump (wind) / Javelin / 800m; DNF (±0.0 m/s) / 0.95 m / 6.00 m / 40.20 (+0.3 m/s) / 3.03 m (±0.0 m/s) / 10.20 m / DNF							

=== 4×100 metres relay women ===
Age group	Record	Athlete	Nationality	Birthdate	Date	Place	Meet	Ref.
W 35	47.30	Rasheta Butler, Latasha Dodson, Odeika Giscombe, Esther Grant	United States	17 Sep 1988; June 1990; 14 Dec 1988; 30 Mar 1983	27 August 2026	Daegu, South Korea	World Masters Championships	
W 40	48.01	Gianna Mogentale, Julie Brims, Jackie Bezuidenhout, Kylie Strong	Australia	2 December 1963; 7 January 1966; 15 October 1966; 14 May 1967	8 August 2009	Lahti, Finland	World Masters Championships	
W 45	48.92	Giola Motti, Julie Brims, Julie Forster, Gianna Mogentale	Australia	4 March 1965; 7 January 1966; 14 April 1961; 2 December 1963	23 April 2011	Brisbane, Australia	Australia Masters Championships	
W 50	50.70	Mandy Mason, Julie Brims, Lenore Lambert, Janelle Delaney	Australia	16 December 1967; 7 January 1966; 22 December 1969; 31 December 1969	9 July 2022	Tampere, Finland	World Masters Championships	
W 55	53.19	Sharee Maxsimovic, Julie Brims, Stephanie Noon, Julie Forster	Australia	1965; 7 January 1966; January 1966; 14 April 1961	3 April 2022	Brisbane, Australia	Australian Masters Championships	
W 60	54.22	Akiko Homma, Nobuko Kumatoriya, Natsuko Horibe, Naomi Miyata	Japan	1 July 1962; 10 Nov 1965; 23 Aug 1965; 1 Oct 1964	27 August 2026	Daegu, South Korea	World Masters Championships	
W 65	56.88	Susan Turner, Julie Forster, Sukie Southern, Sally Stagles	Australia	3 July 1960; 14 Apr 1961; 17 Apr 1959; 20 Sep 1960	27 August 2026	Daegu, South Korea	World Masters Championships	
W 70	1:04.28	Karin Förster, Petra Zörner, Karin Stump, Ingrid Meier	Germany	12 August 1946; 22 November 1946; 9 December 1945; 1 April 1947	5 August 2017	Aarhus, Denmark	European Masters Championships	
W 75	1:10.19	Irene Obera, Barbara Jordan, Christel Donley, Flo Meiler	United States	7 December 1933; 27 October 1935; 20 January 1935; 1 June 1934	17 July 2011	Sacramento, United States	World Masters Championships	
W 80	1:21.06	Christel Donley, Flo Meiler; Fei-Mei Chou, Irene Obera	United States	20 January 1935; 1 June 1934; 27 October 1935; 7 December 1933	16 August 2015	Lyon France	World Masters Championships	
W 85	1:50.31	Frances Styles, Patricia Peterson, Johnnye Valien, Josephine Stewart	United States	1 September 1927; 14 April 1926; 24 July 1925.. September 1924	26 July 2013	Berea United States	National Senior Games	

=== 4×400 metres relay women ===
Age group	Record	Athlete	Nationality	Birthdate	Date	Place	Meet	Ref.
W 35	3:48.68	Odeika Giscombe, Christina Elder, Christina Trucks, Ercka Charles	United States	14 December 1988; 7 February 1988; 5 March 1984; 8 February 1989	21 July 2024	Sacramento, United States	USATF Masters Championships	
W 40	3:51.85	Christine Hufenbecher, Maureen Zivic, Christina Trucks, Kristy Matthews	United States	May 1980; 10 May 1984; 5 March 1984; March 1973	7 June 2025	Moorpark, United States	So Cal Jim Bush Championships	
W 45	4:01.22	Julie Forster, Giola Motti, Gianna Mogentale, Julie Brims	Australia	14 April 1961; 4 March 1965; 2 December 1963; 7 January 1966	24 April 2011	Brisbane, Australia	Australia Masters Championships	
W 50	4:09.92	Evette Cordy, Julie Brims, Lenore Lambert, Jeanelle Delaney	Australia	28 September 1973; 7 January 1966; 22 December 1969; 31 December 1969	25 August 2024	Gothenburg, Sweden	World Masters Championships	
W 55 (progression)	4:23.52	Susan McDonald, Lisa Valle, Michelle Rohl, Roxanne Brockner	United States	29 March 1963; 29 April 1966; 12 November 1965; 27 December 1965	25 July 2021	Ames, United States	USATF Masters Championships	
W 60	4:30.03	Lisa Margareth Thomas, Christine Anthony, Janice Ellacott, Virginia Mitchell	Great Britain	28 March 1965; 26 January 1963; 5 November 1960; 29 January 1963	19 October 2025	Madeira, Portugal	European Masters Championships	
W 65	4:52.76	Carol Davis, Barbara Blurton, Jeanette Flynn, Evelyn Peake	Australia	24 January 1951; 19 March 1950; 4 November 1951; 14 January 1950	12 June 2017	Darwin, Australia	Australian Masters Championships	
W 70	5:32.95	Peggy Macliver, Jean Hampson, Anne Lang, Marge Allison	Australia	30 March 1944; 2 May 1945; 10 February 1943; 20 April 1939	16 August 2015	Lyon, France	World Masters Championships	
W 75	6:53.27	Mary Robinson, Marina Myles Worsley, Marie Luise Michelsohn, Rose Green	United States	22 March 1942; 17 October 1943; 8 October 1941; 24 May 1938	21 July 2019	Toronto, Canada	NCCWMA	
W 80	7:59.18	Rose Green, Jeanne Daprano, Carolyn Langenwalter, Lynne Hurrell	United States	14 May 1938; 16 September 1936; 17 January 1938; 4 August 1934	16 September 2018	Málaga, Spain	World Masters Championships	

=== 4×800 metres relay women ===
Age group	Record	Athlete	Nationality	Birthdate	Date	Place	Meet	Ref.
W 35	9:16.18	Michelle Cox; Fiona Gettings; Eimear English; Laura Frey	Ireland	17 December 1982; 19 February 1981; 24 January 1989; 2 June 1989	31 July 2024	Dublin, Ireland	Dublin Graded meet	
W 35	9:10.13	Katrijn Van Hoecke; Petra Bruggeman; Katrijn Vande Riviere; Linda Hermans	Belgium	9 December 1986; 26 September 1980; 19 August 1990; 20 November 1984	24 August 2025	Lebbeke, Belgium	PK estafette Lebbeke	
W 40	9:16.91	Shari Boyle; Courtney Babcock; Diane Cummins; Larissa MacMillan	Canada	12 January 1973; 30 June 1972; 19 January 1974; 2 June 1976	29 August 2016	Vancouver, Canada	American Master Games	
W 45	9:26.49	Maria Dunne; Maria McCambridge; Denise Egan; Denise Toner	Ireland	25 October 1977; 10 July 1975; 3 January 1978; 17 April 1978	31 July 2024	Dublin, Ireland	Dublin Graded meet	
W 50	10:14.64	Christine Olen; Aeron Arlin-Genet; Terry Ballou; Lisa Valle	United States	20 December 1967; 28 June 1967; 20 October 1967; 29 April 1966	13 July 2019	Ames, United States	USATF Masters Championships	
W 55	10:35.80	Dominique Saint-Louis; Veronica LeShore; Judy Stobbe; Jennifer Harvey	Central Park Track Club United States	1967; 1967; 3 June 1965; 1968	30 June 2024	Union, United States	USATF New Jersey Masters and Open Championships	
W 60	10:45.23	Judy Stobbe; Lorraine Jasper; Terri Rath; Susan McDonald	United States	3 June 1965; 7 October 1961; 3 December 1963; 29 March 1963	17 July 2025	Huntsville, United States	USATF Masters Championships	
W 65	12:31.46	Susan Loyd; Leandra Funk; Tracey Bernett; Lesley Hinz	United States	13 January 1958; 16 February 1956; 27 September 1955; 16 March 1958	29 June 2024	St. Paul, United States	USATF Minnesota Open & Masters Championships	
W 70	13:26.86 (Note: by WMA source; 13:26.49 by other sources)	Eileen Kenny; Margaret Glavey; Mary Lynch; Brigid McCabe	Ireland	19 November 1949; 5 November 1949; 11 April 1951; 25 January 1954	31 July 2024	Dublin, Ireland	Dublin Graded meet	
W 75	21:24.50	Nancy Berger; Angela Staab; Mary Trotto; Cora Hill	United States	22 February 1945; 12 January 1943; 23 May 1947; 8 May 1943	20 July 2023	Greensboro, United States	USATF Masters Championships	

=== 3000 metres race walk women ===
Age group	Record	Athlete	Nationality	Birthdate	Age	Date	Place	Meet	Ref.
W 35	12:00.53	Kjersti Tysse-Plätzer	Norway	18 January 1972	37	31 July 2009	Lillehammer, Norway	Norwegian Championships	
W 40	12:58.85	Kelly Ruddick	Australia	19 April 1973	42	9 January 2016	Ballarat, Australia	AV Shield Round 8	
W 45	13:19.48	Kelly Ruddick	Australia	19 April 1973	45	23 March 2019	Doncaster, Australia	Victorian Masters Championships	
W 50	13:54.3 h	Lynette Ventris	Australia	2 October 1956	50	24 March 2007	Perth, Australia	Western Masters Championships	
W 55	14:16.41	Lynette Ventris	Australia	2 October 1956	55	24 March 2012	Perth, Australia	Western Masters Championships	
W 55	14:04.28+	Michelle Rohl	United States	12 November 1965	58	27 April 2024	Philadelphia, United States	Penn Relays	
W 60	15:21.94	Heather Carr	Australia	13 August 1949	61	22 January 2011	Ballarat, Australia	Victorian Country Championships	
W 65	16:22.1 h	Brenda Riley	Australia	9 November 1939	66	1 April 2006	Melbourne, Australia	Victorian Masters Championships	
W 70	17:13.55	Janine Vignat	France	22 January 1955	70	4 May 2025	Bourg en Bresse, France	Interclub N2 N3	
W 75	19:18.90	Jacqueline Wilson	New Zealand	22 January 1946	75	26 February 2021	Inglewood, New Zealand	New Zealand Masters Championships	
W 80	21:08.2 h	Aina Engberg	Sweden	2 February 1923	80	30 May 2003	Västerås, Sweden	Arostrampen	
W 85	23:24.89	Heather Lee	Australia	17 November 1926	85	5 November 2012	Southport, Australia	Pan Pacific Masters Games	
W 90	24:45.29	Heather Lee	Australia	17 November 1926	91	10 November 2018	Runaway Bay, Australia	Pan Pacific Masters Games	

=== 5000 metres race walk women ===
Age group	Record	Athlete	Nationality	Birthdate	Age	Date	Place	Meet	Ref.
W 35	20:12.41	Elisabetta Perrone	Italy	3 July 1968	35	2 August 2003	Rieti Italy	Italian Championships	
W 40	21:57.40	Kelly Ruddick	Australia	19 April 1973	40	7 October 2013	Geelong Australia	Australian Masters Games	
W 40	21:46.68	Kelly Ruddick	Australia	19 April 1973	40	29 March 2014	Brisbane Australia	Queensland Track Classic	
W 45	22:47.17	Kelly Ruddick	Australia	19 April 1973	48	26 February 2022	Melbourne Australia	Victorian Championships	
W 50	23:37.78	Lynette Ventris	Australia	2 October 1956	50	7 April 2007	Hobart Australia	Australia Masters Championships	
W 55	23:32.84	Michelle Rohl	United States	12 November 1965	58	27 April 2024	Philadelphia, United States	Penn Relays	
W 60	25:41.58	Lynette Ventris	Australia	2 October 1956	61	27 April 2018	Perth Australia	Australian Masters Championships	
W 60	25:41.20	Siw Ibanez Karlström	Sweden	9 July 1957	61	25 August 2018	Eskilstuna Sweden	Swedish Championships	
W 65	27:19.1 h	Brenda Riley	Australia	9 November 1939	65	12 February 2006	Melbourne Australia	Victorian Masters Championships	
W 70	29:16.0 h	Britta Tibbling	Sweden	10 March 1918	71	21 July 1989	San Diego United States	USA Masters Championships	
W 75	31:58.65	Jacqueline Wilson	New Zealand	22 January 1946	75	28 February 2021	Inglewood, New Zealand	New Zealand Masters Championships	
W 80	34:34.50	Anne Centner	South Africa	1 January 1944	81	20 August 2024	Gothenburg, Sweden	World Masters Championships	
W 85	40:06.97	Heather Lee	Australia	17 November 1926	85	3 November 2012	Southport, Australia	Pan Pacific Masters Games	
W 90	41:04.87	Heather Lee	Australia	17 November 1926	91	27 April 2018	Perth, Australia	Australian Masters Championships	

== See also ==
- List of masters world records in road running
- List of centenarian masters track and field records
- List of European records in masters athletics
- United States records in masters athletics
