= 2016 World Masters Athletics Championships =

Coordinates: 31.94950°S 115.78194°E

- Dates: 26 October - 6 November 2016
- Host city: Perth, Australia
- Venue: Western Australian Athletics Stadium
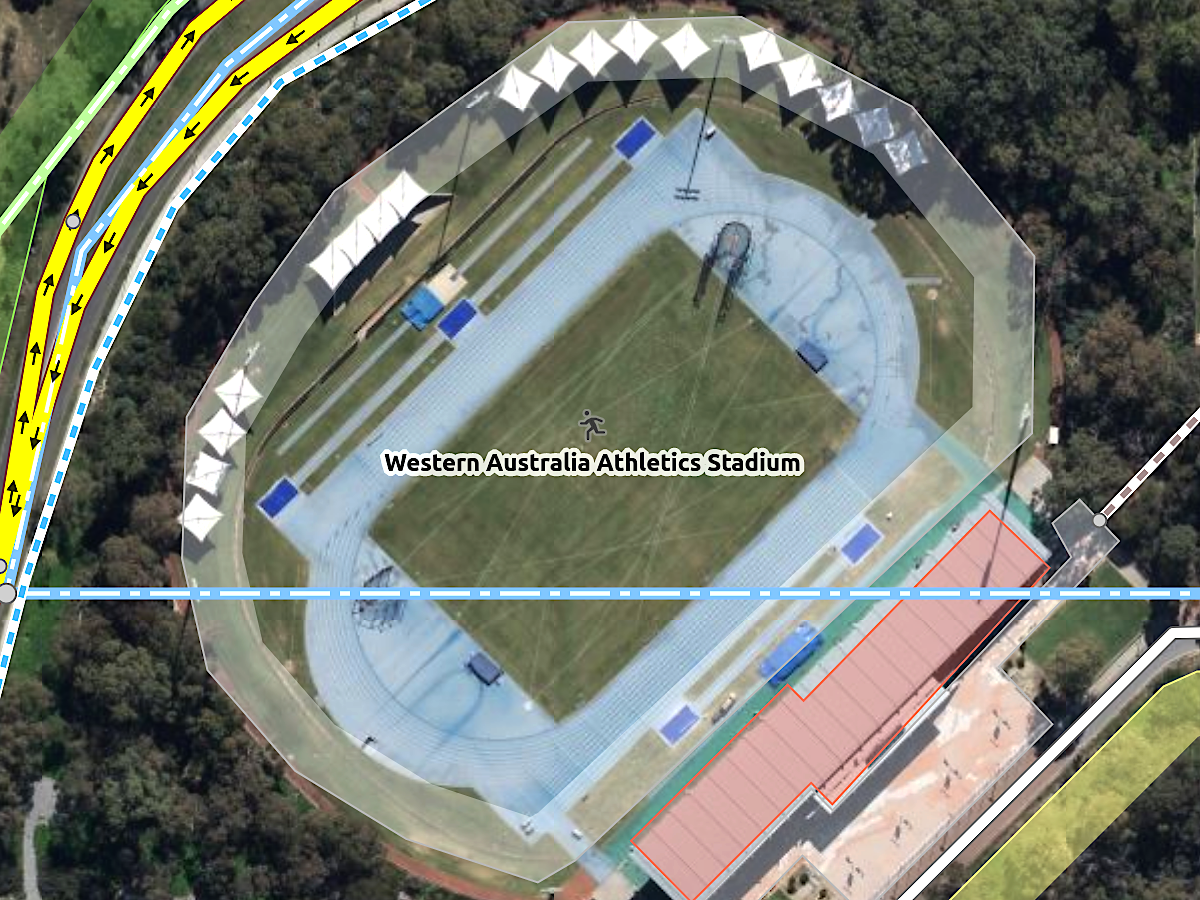
- Level: Masters
- Type: Outdoor
- Participation: 4028 athletes from 90 nations
- Official website: Archived 2016-11-12 at the Wayback Machine

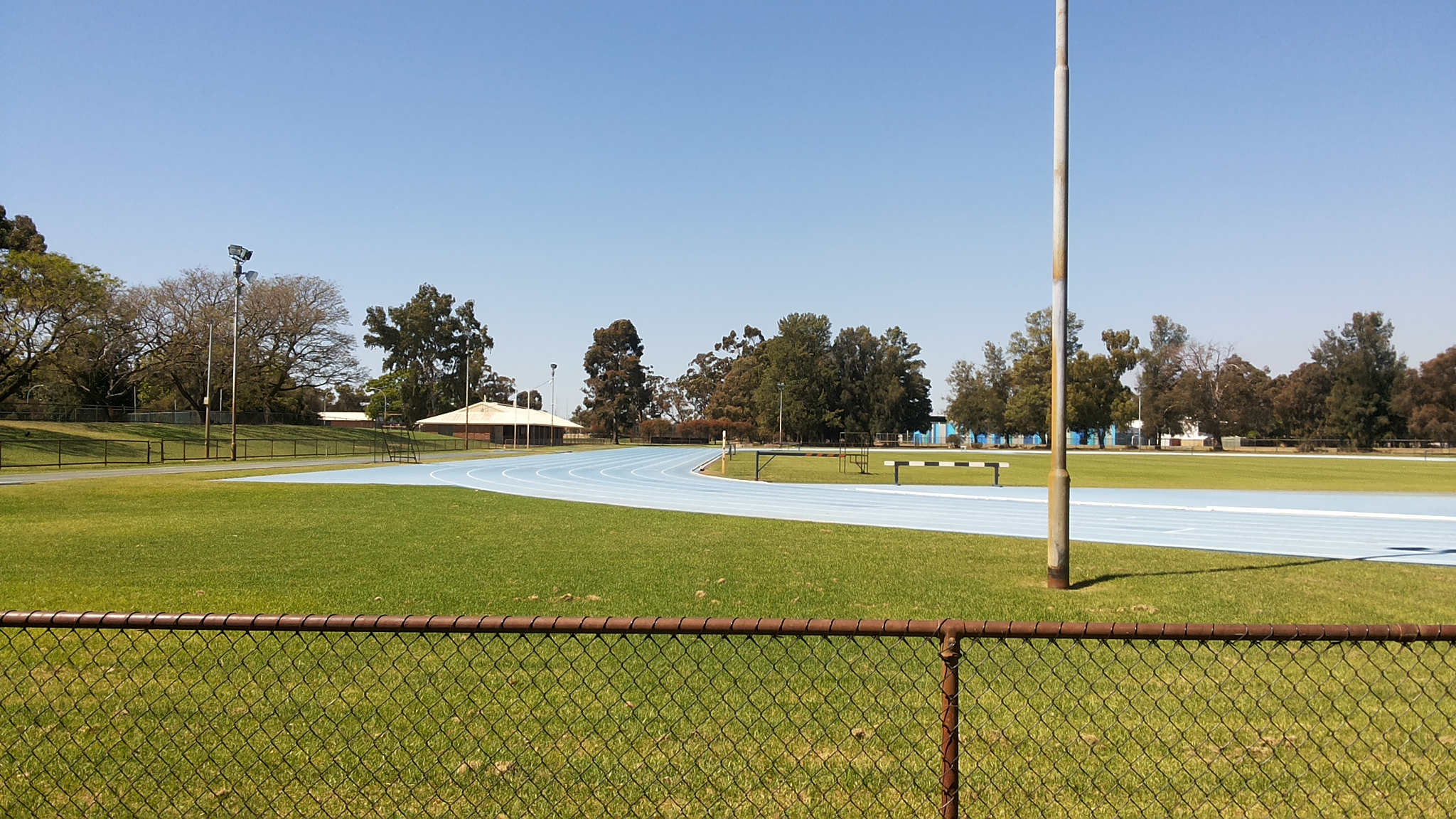
Ern Clark Athletic Track

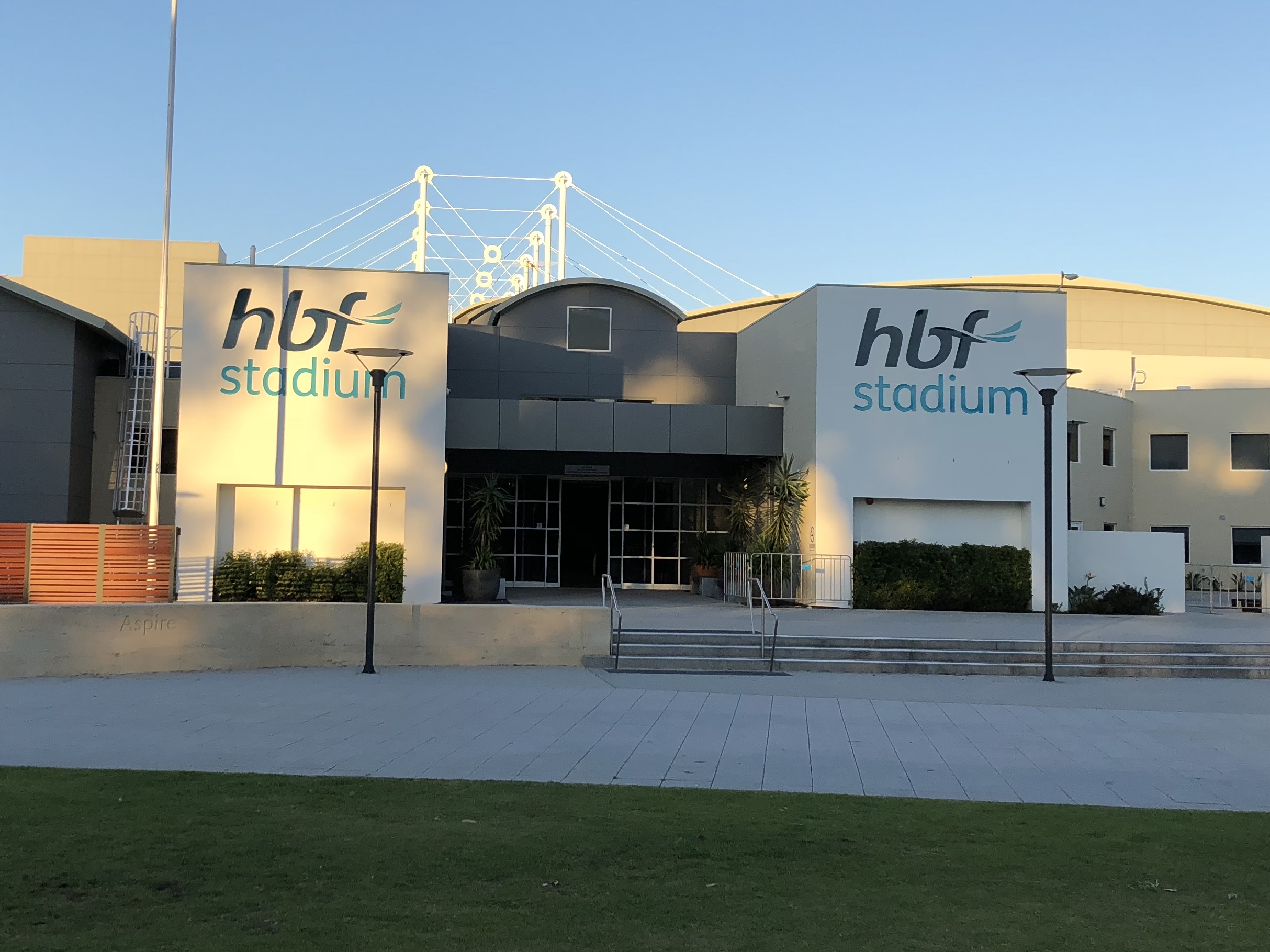
Technical Information Centre

2016 World Masters Athletics Championships was the 22nd in a series of World Masters Athletics Outdoor Championships that took place in Perth, Australia from 26 October to 6 November 2016. Prior to this year, the championships in this biennial series were in odd-numbered years. Beginning in 2016, the championships were held in even-numbered years. The change was made to avoid conflict with the quadrennial World Masters Games, which had been held in odd-numbered years since 2005.

The main venue was Western Australian Athletics Stadium, which had a nine-lane mondotrack laid in 2014. Supplemental venues included Ern Clark Athletic Centre, which also had a recently upgraded eight-lane mondotrack. Road walks and cross country were held at Alderbury and Perry Lakes Reserves in Floreat. Half marathon and marathon followed the banks of the Swan River, with start and finish at the WA Water Sports Club. HBF Stadium served as the technical information centre. Welcoming ceremony was held at Elizabeth Quay.

This championship was organized by World Masters Athletics (WMA) in coordination with a local organising committee.

The WMA is the global governing body of the sport of athletics for athletes 35 years of age or older, setting rules for masters athletics competition. At the general assembly during this championship, a motion was passed to change two events after this edition of the series:

- The marathon would be replaced by a half marathon.
- The 10K road race would be replaced by the 10K race walk.

In addition to a full range of track and field events, non-stadia events included 8K cross country, 10K race walk, 20K race walk, half marathon, and marathon.

== Results ==
Official results are archived at perth2016. Past championships results are archived at WMA. Additional archives are available from British Masters Athletic Federation in HTML format, from Český atletický as a searchable pdf, from documents.pub as a searchable pdf, and from Masters Athletics Western Australia as a pdf book.

Masters world records set at this championships are listed below and are from the list of world records in the pdf book unless otherwise noted. More complete lists of medalists are contained in separate articles for women and for men.

=== Women ===
World records are listed below.

Event	Athlete(s)	Nationality	Performance
W70 400 metres	Aletta Ungerer	RSA	1:13.97
W65 800 metres	Sabra Harvey	USA	2:39.61
W65 5000 metres	Kathryn Martin	USA	20:08.17
W70 80 metres hurdles	Marianne Maier	AUT	15.72
W80 80 metres hurdles	Irene Obera	USA	18.70
W65 2K steeplechase	Kathryn Martin	USA	8:57.54
W75 2K steeplechase	Xuhua Chen	CHN	11:30.55
W80 2K steeplechase	Anne Martin	GBR	13:38.80
W85 2K steeplechase	Clasina Van der Veeken	NZL	18:30.80
W85 5K race walk	Christiane Dauphinet	AUS	41:20.34
W90 5K race walk	Elena Pagu	ROU	44:28.33
W90 10K race walk	Elena Pagu	ROU	1:31:21
W70 20K race walk	Elsa Meyer	RSA	2:10:58
W75 20K race walk	Vey Hildegard	RSA	2:33:39
W65 4 × 400 metres relay	Paula Moorhouse, Carol Davis, Kathryn Heagney, Lyn Peake	AUS	5:06.10
W65 4 × 400 metres relay	Rosalind Tabor, Janette Stevenson, Hendricka White, Caroline Marler	GBR	5:12.77
W80 4 × 400 metres relay	Mary Harada, Christel Donley, Irene Obera, Jean Daprano	USA	8:26.42
W75 high jump	Kathy Bergen	USA	1.22
W80 heptathlon	Irene Obera	USA	6071
W45 half marathon	Carla Machado	POR	1:22:07
W45 half marathon	Hong Li	CHN	1:23:12
W50 half marathon	Sally Gibbs	NZL	1:22:02
W50 half marathon	Zohra Graziani	FRA	1:28:14
W50 half marathon	Soledad Castro Soliño	ESP	1:28:28
W55 half marathon	Robyn Basman	AUS	1:30:45
W55 half marathon	Janet Ferguson	AUS	1:33:02
W60 half marathon	Johanna Clarkson	AUS	1:42:50
W60 half marathon	Helen Stanley	AUS	1:43:16
W60 half marathon	Joy Radford	GBR	1:45:05
W65 half marathon	Kristiina Huttunen	FIN	1:51:52
W70 half marathon	Lavinia Petrie	AUS	1:41:00
W80 half marathon	Sally Gibbs	NZL	1:22:02

=== Men ===
World records are listed below.

Event	Athlete(s)	Nationality	Performance
M85 4 × 400 metres relay	Jinbiao Wang, Guiben Sun, Zhiyong Wang, Pengxue Su	CHN	8:35.23
M75 2K steeplechase	Jean-Louis Esnault	FRA	8:50.65
M50 half marathon	Paul Thompson	GBR	1:12:48
M50 half marathon	Bruce Graham	AUS	1:14:58
M50 half marathon	John Meagher	AUS	1:15:59
M55 half marathon	David Sweeney	AUS	1:13:42
M55 half marathon	John Meagher	KEN	1:15:15
M70 half marathon	Jean Claude Demarque	FRA	1:31:34
M70 half marathon	Albert Anderegg	SUI	1:32:20
M70 half marathon	Martin Ford	GBR	1:37:28
M70 half marathon	Donald Mathewson	AUS	1:37:33
M80 half marathon	Roger Bardin	FRA	2:12:53
M55 throws pentathlon	Burton Haupt	RSA	4800
