= 2016 World Masters Athletics Championships Women =

The twenty-second World Masters Athletics Championships were held in Perth Australia, from October 26–November 6, 2016. This was the first even year of the biennial championship as beginning in 2016, the championships moved to be held in even numbered years. The World Masters Athletics Championships serve the division of the sport of athletics for people over 35 years of age, referred to as Masters athletics.

A full range of track and field events were held, along with a cross country race and a marathon.

== Results ==
=== 100 metres ===
==== W35 100 metres ====
Wind: +3.4

Pos	Athlete	Age	Country	Result
1st place, gold medalist(s)	Dedeh Erawati	W37	Indonesia	12.18
2nd place, silver medalist(s)	Carol de Maul Aldana	W35	Guatemala	12.27
3rd place, bronze medalist(s)	Natasha Hughes	W37	Australia	12.34

==== W40 100 metres ====
Wind: +3.8

Pos	Athlete	Age	Country	Result
1st place, gold medalist(s)	Wendy Seegers	W40	Australia	11.88
2nd place, silver medalist(s)	Heike Martin	W44	Germany	12.30
3rd place, bronze medalist(s)	Karen Long	W41	Australia	12.47

==== W45 100 metres ====
Wind: +1.5

Pos	Athlete	Age	Country	Result
1st place, gold medalist(s)	Emmanuelle McGowan	W48	United States	12.80
2nd place, silver medalist(s)	Michelle Thomas Gabriel	W45	Great Britain	12.91
3rd place, bronze medalist(s)	Monalisa Rivera	W48	Puerto Rico	12.94

==== W50 100 metres ====
Wind: +1.7

Pos	Athlete	Age	Country	Result
1st place, gold medalist(s)	Julie Brims	W50	Australia	12.39
2nd place, silver medalist(s)	Jackie Bezuidenhout	W50	Australia	12.98
3rd place, bronze medalist(s)	Naomi Miyata	W52	Japan	13.01

==== W55 100 metres ====
Wind: +2.3

Pos	Athlete	Age	Country	Result
1st place, gold medalist(s)	Nicole Alexis	W56	France	13.20
2nd place, silver medalist(s)	Sue Turner	W56	Australia	13.76
3rd place, bronze medalist(s)	Nilsa Paris-Millan	W59	Puerto Rico	13.92

==== W60 100 metres ====
Wind: +2.3

Pos	Athlete	Age	Country	Result
1st place, gold medalist(s)	Caroline Powell	W62	Great Britain	14.16
2nd place, silver medalist(s)	Margaret Tweedie	W62	Australia	14.71
3rd place, bronze medalist(s)	Lynne Choate	W63	Australia	14.96

==== W65 100 metres ====
Wind: +2.1

Pos	Athlete	Age	Country	Result
1st place, gold medalist(s)	Carol Davis	W65	Australia	14.54
2nd place, silver medalist(s)	Lyn Peake	W66	Australia	14.65
3rd place, bronze medalist(s)	Siling Bi	W65	China	14.87

==== W70 100 metres ====
Wind: +3.6

Pos	Athlete	Age	Country	Result
1st place, gold medalist(s)	Aletta Ungerer	W70	South Africa	15.26
2nd place, silver medalist(s)	Brenda Fee	W70	Great Britain	15.44
3rd place, bronze medalist(s)	Fuen Teng	W70	China	15.55

==== W75 100 metres ====
Wind: +0.9

Pos	Athlete	Age	Country	Result
1st place, gold medalist(s)	Kathy Bergen	W76	United States	15.56
2nd place, silver medalist(s)	Imoto Yamakawa Sumiko	W78	Brazil	17.56
3rd place, bronze medalist(s)	Miriam Cudmore	W78	Australia	17.73

==== W80 100 metres ====
Wind: +3.3

Pos	Athlete	Age	Country	Result
1st place, gold medalist(s)	Irene Obera	W82	United States	16.67
2nd place, silver medalist(s)	Corinne Collins	W80	Australia	18.44
3rd place, bronze medalist(s)	Jean Daprano	W80	United States	18.51

==== W85 100 metres ====
Wind: +1.9

Pos	Athlete	Age	Country	Result
1st place, gold medalist(s)	Garcia Ramirez Ernestin	W86	Mexico	21.25
2nd place, silver medalist(s)	Anna Du Plooy	W85	South Africa	22.10
3rd place, bronze medalist(s)	der Van Veeken Clasina	W85	New Zealand	23.89

==== W90 100 meters ====
Wind: +1.9

Pos	Athlete	Age	Country	Result
1st place, gold medalist(s)	Shirley Dietderich	W90	United States	31.60
2nd place, silver medalist(s)	Joy Duncan	W91	Australia	1:34.90

=== 200 metres ===
==== W35 200 metres ====
Wind: +3.5

Pos	Athlete	Age	Country	Result
1st place, gold medalist(s)	Garzon Garcia Carolina	W37	Spain	25.27
2nd place, silver medalist(s)	Dedeh Erawati	W37	Indonesia	25.27
3rd place, bronze medalist(s)	Ahndraea Allen	W35	United States	25.49

==== W40 200 metres ====
Wind: +3.7

Pos	Athlete	Age	Country	Result
1st place, gold medalist(s)	Wendy Seegers	W40	Australia	24.35
2nd place, silver medalist(s)	LaTrica Dendy	W43	United States	25.47
3rd place, bronze medalist(s)	Ludmi Nefjodova-Volkova	W40	Latvia	25.76

==== W45 200 metres ====
Wind: +1.9

Pos	Athlete	Age	Country	Result
1st place, gold medalist(s)	Emmanuelle McGowan	W48	United States	25.51
2nd place, silver medalist(s)	Janelle Delaney	W46	Australia	25.82
3rd place, bronze medalist(s)	Kylie Strong	W49	Australia	26.49

==== W50 200 metres ====
Wind: +1.6

Pos	Athlete	Age	Country	Result
1st place, gold medalist(s)	Julie Brims	W50	Australia	25.84
2nd place, silver medalist(s)	Iris Opitz	W50	Germany	26.48
3rd place, bronze medalist(s)	Elizabeth Wilson	W53	New Zealand	26.83

==== W55 200 metres ====
Wind: +3.0

Pos	Athlete	Age	Country	Result
1st place, gold medalist(s)	Nicole Alexis	W56	France	27.27
2nd place, silver medalist(s)	Jeanette Carlisle	W55	South Africa	28.71
3rd place, bronze medalist(s)	Sue Turner	W56	Australia	28.83

==== W60 200 metres ====
Wind: +1.1

Pos	Athlete	Age	Country	Result
1st place, gold medalist(s)	Caroline Powell	W62	Great Britain	28.82
2nd place, silver medalist(s)	Margaret Tweedie	W62	Australia	29.99
3rd place, bronze medalist(s)	Leanne Monk	W60	Australia	30.99

==== W65 200 metres ====
Wind: +4.1

Pos	Athlete	Age	Country	Result
1st place, gold medalist(s)	Lyn Peake	W66	Australia	30.75
2nd place, silver medalist(s)	Siling Bi	W65	China	31.07
3rd place, bronze medalist(s)	Wilma Perkins	W67	Australia	31.11

==== W70 200 metres ====
Wind: +2.4

Pos	Athlete	Age	Country	Result
1st place, gold medalist(s)	Brenda Fee	W70	Great Britain	32.00
2nd place, silver medalist(s)	Aletta Ungerer	W70	South Africa	32.21
3rd place, bronze medalist(s)	Marge Allison	W72	Australia	32.92

==== W75 200 metres ====
Wind: +4.2

Pos	Athlete	Age	Country	Result
1st place, gold medalist(s)	Kathy Bergen	W76	United States	34.39
2nd place, silver medalist(s)	Ruth Johnson	W75	Australia	36.79
3rd place, bronze medalist(s)	Inkeri Janhunen	W75	Finland	36.82

==== W80 200 metres ====
Wind: +4.4

Pos	Athlete	Age	Country	Result
1st place, gold medalist(s)	Irene Obera	W82	United States	37.25
2nd place, silver medalist(s)	Corinne Collins	W80	Australia	38.76
3rd place, bronze medalist(s)	Jean Daprano	W80	United States	39.11

==== W85 200 metres ====
Wind: +2.8

Pos	Athlete	Age	Country	Result
1st place, gold medalist(s)	Garcia Ramirez Ernestin	W86	Mexico	47.89
2nd place, silver medalist(s)	Plooy Du Anna	W85	South Africa	50.04
3rd place, bronze medalist(s)	Ruth Helfenstein	W85	Switzerland	57.07

=== 400 metres ===
==== W35 400 metres ====
Pos	Athlete	Age	Country	Result
1st place, gold medalist(s)	Ahndraea Allen	W35	United States	57.08
2nd place, silver medalist(s)	Garzon Garcia Carolina	W37	Spain	57.47
3rd place, bronze medalist(s)	Den Van Bulk Jeannette	W39	Australia	1:00.04

==== W40 400 metres ====
Pos	Athlete	Age	Country	Result
1st place, gold medalist(s)	LaTrica Dendy	W43	United States	56.90
2nd place, silver medalist(s)	Ludmi Nefjodova-Volkova	W40	Latvia	58.69
3rd place, bronze medalist(s)	Vanessa Story	W42	New Zealand	59.87

==== W45 400 metres ====
Pos	Athlete	Age	Country	Result
1st place, gold medalist(s)	Janelle Delaney	W46	Australia	57.38
2nd place, silver medalist(s)	Lenorë Lambert	W46	Australia	59.19
3rd place, bronze medalist(s)	Lisa Daley	W46	United States	1:00.10

==== W50 400 metres ====
Pos	Athlete	Age	Country	Result
1st place, gold medalist(s)	Elizabeth Wilson	W53	New Zealand	1:02.42
2nd place, silver medalist(s)	Donna Burgess	W54	Australia	1:04.22
3rd place, bronze medalist(s)	Fiona Leonard	W50	Australia	1:06.10

==== W55 400 metres ====
Pos	Athlete	Age	Country	Result
1st place, gold medalist(s)	Elaine Pretorius	W55	South Africa	1:04.84
2nd place, silver medalist(s)	Lorraine Jasper	W55	United States	1:06.97
3rd place, bronze medalist(s)	Sue Bourke	W56	Australia	1:07.80

==== W60 400 metres ====
Pos	Athlete	Age	Country	Result
1st place, gold medalist(s)	Caroline Powell	W62	Great Britain	1:06.18
2nd place, silver medalist(s)	Liz Alexander	W61	South Africa	1:10.26
3rd place, bronze medalist(s)	Margaret Tweedie	W62	Australia	1:11.01

==== W65 400 metres ====
Pos	Athlete	Age	Country	Result
1st place, gold medalist(s)	Lyn Peake	W66	Australia	1:10.99
2nd place, silver medalist(s)	Carol Davis	W65	Australia	1:11.27
3rd place, bronze medalist(s)	Caroline Marler	W65	Great Britain	1:11.34

==== W70 400 metres ====
Pos	Athlete	Age	Country	Result
1st place, gold medalist(s)	Aletta Ungerer	W70	South Africa	1:13.97 WR
2nd place, silver medalist(s)	Brenda Fee	W70	Great Britain	1:17.70
3rd place, bronze medalist(s)	Marge Allison	W72	Australia	1:18.72

==== W75 400 metres ====
Pos	Athlete	Age	Country	Result
1st place, gold medalist(s)	Inkeri Janhunen	W75	Finland	1:25.31
2nd place, silver medalist(s)	Kathleen Stewart	W77	Great Britain	1:25.94
3rd place, bronze medalist(s)	Ruth Johnson	W75	Australia	1:29.78

==== W80 400 metres ====
Pos	Athlete	Age	Country	Result
1st place, gold medalist(s)	Corinne Collins	W80	Australia	1:32.75
2nd place, silver medalist(s)	Jean Daprano	W80	United States	1:35.34
3rd place, bronze medalist(s)	Astrid Nilsson	W80	Sweden	1:51.05

==== W85 400 metres ====
Pos	Athlete	Age	Country	Result
1st place, gold medalist(s)	Ernestin Garcia Ramirez	W86	Mexico	2:06.20
2nd place, silver medalist(s)	Anna Du Plooy	W85	South Africa	2:15.84
3rd place, bronze medalist(s)	der Van Veeken Clasina	W85	New Zealand	2:17.54

=== 800 metres ===
==== W35 800 metres ====
Pos	Athlete	Age	Country	Result
1st place, gold medalist(s)	Aneta Kaczmarek	W35	Poland	2:10.13
2nd place, silver medalist(s)	María Prosiuk Paula	W38	Argentina	2:14.09
3rd place, bronze medalist(s)	Angie Ross	W35	New Zealand	2:19.54

==== W40 800 metres ====
Pos	Athlete	Age	Country	Result
1st place, gold medalist(s)	Belinda Martin	W42	Australia	2:16.76
2nd place, silver medalist(s)	Evi Polito	W40	Germany	2:18.06
3rd place, bronze medalist(s)	Denisa Severová	W40	Czech Republic	2:19.59

==== W45 800 metres ====
Pos	Athlete	Age	Country	Result
1st place, gold medalist(s)	Nicole Weijling-Dissel	W49	Netherlands	2:17.97
2nd place, silver medalist(s)	Simona Prunea	W46	Italy	2:24.83
3rd place, bronze medalist(s)	Christine Gentile	W46	United States	2:28.15

==== W50 800 metres ====
Pos	Athlete	Age	Country	Result
1st place, gold medalist(s)	Salome Vermeulen	W50	South Africa	2:22.70
2nd place, silver medalist(s)	Donna Burgess	W54	Australia	2:29.18
3rd place, bronze medalist(s)	Corinne Debaets	W52	Belgium	2:30.07

==== W55 800 metres ====
Pos	Athlete	Age	Country	Result
1st place, gold medalist(s)	Lorraine Jasper	W55	United States	2:32.14
2nd place, silver medalist(s)	Elaine Pretorius	W55	South Africa	2:33.64
3rd place, bronze medalist(s)	Victoria Gunn	W55	Australia	2:35.49

==== W60 800 metres ====
Pos	Athlete	Age	Country	Result
1st place, gold medalist(s)	Jeanette Flynn	W64	Australia	2:44.51
2nd place, silver medalist(s)	Liz Alexander	W61	South Africa	2:44.96
3rd place, bronze medalist(s)	Margaret Saunders	W62	Australia	2:47.42

==== W65 800 metres ====
Pos	Athlete	Age	Country	Result
1st place, gold medalist(s)	Sabra Harvey	W67	United States	2:39.61 WR
2nd place, silver medalist(s)	Kathryn Martin	W65	United States	2:41.34R
3rd place, bronze medalist(s)	Rosalind Tabor	W67	Great Britain	2:47.38

==== W70 800 metres ====
Pos	Athlete	Age	Country	Result
1st place, gold medalist(s)	Anne Lang	W73	Australia	3:13.32
2nd place, silver medalist(s)	Mizue Matsuda	W70	Japan	3:14.27
3rd place, bronze medalist(s)	Patricia Gallagher	W71	Great Britain	3:18.79

==== W75 800 metres ====
Pos	Athlete	Age	Country	Result
1st place, gold medalist(s)	Inkeri Janhunen	W75	Finland	3:19.52
2nd place, silver medalist(s)	Kathleen Stewart	W77	Great Britain	3:31.47
3rd place, bronze medalist(s)	Kristina Karlsson	W76	Sweden	3:44.97

==== W80 800 metres ====
Pos	Athlete	Age	Country	Result
1st place, gold medalist(s)	Jean Daprano	W80	United States	3:47.07
2nd place, silver medalist(s)	Anne Martin	W80	Great Britain	4:34.67
3rd place, bronze medalist(s)	Mary Harada	W81	United States	5:32.76

==== W85 800 metres ====
Pos	Athlete	Age	Country	Result
1st place, gold medalist(s)	Christiane Dauphinet	W85	Australia	5:35.14
2nd place, silver medalist(s)	der Van Veeken Clasina	W85	New Zealand	5:46.06
3rd place, bronze medalist(s)	Ruth Helfenstein	W85	Switzerland	5:46.60

=== 1500 metres ===
==== W35 1500 metres ====
Pos	Athlete	Age	Country	Result
1st place, gold medalist(s)	Anna Kasapis	W39	Australia	4:41.63
2nd place, silver medalist(s)	Patrycja Wlodarczyk	W36	Poland	4:46.45
3rd place, bronze medalist(s)	Angie Ross	W35	New Zealand	4:49.35

==== W40 1500 metres ====
Pos	Athlete	Age	Country	Result
1st place, gold medalist(s)	Belinda Martin	W42	Australia	4:35.10
2nd place, silver medalist(s)	Kate Seibold	W41	Australia	4:49.51
3rd place, bronze medalist(s)	Martina Schumacher	W40	Germany	4:51.12

==== W45 1500 metres ====
Pos	Athlete	Age	Country	Result
1st place, gold medalist(s)	Nicole Weijling-Dissel	W49	Netherlands	4:40.54
2nd place, silver medalist(s)	Simona Prunea	W46	Italy	4:57.10
3rd place, bronze medalist(s)	María Guardeño Jimenez	W47	Spain	4:57.11

==== W50 1500 metres ====
Pos	Athlete	Age	Country	Result
1st place, gold medalist(s)	Salome Vermeulen	W50	South Africa	4:48.27
2nd place, silver medalist(s)	Lucy Elliott	W50	Great Britain	4:48.55
3rd place, bronze medalist(s)	Sally Gibbs	W53	New Zealand	4:49.97

==== W55 1500 metres ====
Pos	Athlete	Age	Country	Result
1st place, gold medalist(s)	Robyn Basman	W57	Australia	5:07.89
2nd place, silver medalist(s)	Lorraine Jasper	W55	United States	5:08.96
3rd place, bronze medalist(s)	Monica Regonesi	W55	Chile	5:15.06

==== W60 1500 metres ====
Pos	Athlete	Age	Country	Result
1st place, gold medalist(s)	Rosemary Roediger	W62	Australia	5:45.06
2nd place, silver medalist(s)	Rita Schubert	W62	Germany	5:45.51
3rd place, bronze medalist(s)	Danielle Justin	W64	Belgium	5:46.02

==== W65 1500 metres ====
Pos	Athlete	Age	Country	Result
1st place, gold medalist(s)	Sabra Harvey	W67	United States	5:39.71
2nd place, silver medalist(s)	Kathryn Martin	W65	United States	5:40.15
3rd place, bronze medalist(s)	Rosalind Tabor	W67	Great Britain	5:45.77

==== W70 1500 metres ====
Pos	Athlete	Age	Country	Result
1st place, gold medalist(s)	Lavinia Petrie	W73	Australia	6:05.47
2nd place, silver medalist(s)	Mizue Matsuda	W70	Japan	6:40.56
3rd place, bronze medalist(s)	Patricia Gallagher	W71	Great Britain	6:44.27

==== W75 1500 metres ====
Pos	Athlete	Age	Country	Result
1st place, gold medalist(s)	Inkeri Janhunen	W75	Finland	6:53.82
2nd place, silver medalist(s)	Carol Melling	W75	Australia	7:47.64
3rd place, bronze medalist(s)	Ikuko Suzuki	W79	Japan	7:50.45

==== W80 1500 metres ====
Pos	Athlete	Age	Country	Result
1st place, gold medalist(s)	Jean Daprano	W80	United States	7:57.61
2nd place, silver medalist(s)	Denise Leclerc	W83	France	8:02.96
3rd place, bronze medalist(s)	Anne Martin	W80	Great Britain	9:16.34

==== W85 1500 metres ====
Pos	Athlete	Age	Country	Result
1st place, gold medalist(s)	Ruth Helfenstein	W85	Switzerland	11:25.27
2nd place, silver medalist(s)	der Van Veeken Clasina	W85	New Zealand	11:43.93

=== 5000 metres ===
==== W35 5000 metres ====
Pos	Athlete	Age	Country	Result
1st place, gold medalist(s)	Anna Fitzgerald	W39	Australia	18:06.09
2nd place, silver medalist(s)	Patrycja Wlodarczyk	W36	Poland	18:36.64
3rd place, bronze medalist(s)	Denise Tappatà	W36	Italy	19:30.84

==== W40 5000 metres ====
Pos	Athlete	Age	Country	Result
1st place, gold medalist(s)	Belinda Martin	W42	Australia	17:23.59
2nd place, silver medalist(s)	Martina Schumacher	W40	Germany	18:11.62
3rd place, bronze medalist(s)	Cathy Mccourt	W43	Ireland	18:19.30

==== W45 5000 metres ====
Pos	Athlete	Age	Country	Result
1st place, gold medalist(s)	Hong Li	W46	China	18:16.10
2nd place, silver medalist(s)	Francesca Smith	W49	Australia	18:48.08
3rd place, bronze medalist(s)	Caroline Mayers	W45	Great Britain	19:18.45

==== W50 5000 metres ====
Pos	Athlete	Age	Country	Result
1st place, gold medalist(s)	Lucy Elliott	W50	Great Britain	17:31.01
2nd place, silver medalist(s)	Sally Gibbs	W53	New Zealand	17:38.44
3rd place, bronze medalist(s)	Ulla Jacobsen Binderup	W51	Denmark	18:28.34

==== W55 5000 metres ====
Pos	Athlete	Age	Country	Result
1st place, gold medalist(s)	Janet Ferguson	W55	Australia	19:21.05
2nd place, silver medalist(s)	Robyn Basman	W57	Australia	19:21.59
3rd place, bronze medalist(s)	Monica Regonesi	W55	Chile	20:05.73

==== W60 5000 metres ====
Pos	Athlete	Age	Country	Result
1st place, gold medalist(s)	Danielle Justin	W64	Belgium	21:05.81
2nd place, silver medalist(s)	Maureen Moyle	W61	Australia	21:17.44
3rd place, bronze medalist(s)	Rosemary Roediger	W62	Australia	21:19.31

==== W65 5000 metres ====
Pos	Athlete	Age	Country	Result
1st place, gold medalist(s)	Kathyrn Martin	W65	United States	20:08.17 WR
2nd place, silver medalist(s)	Sabra Harvey	W67	United States	20:40.80
3rd place, bronze medalist(s)	Janette Stevenson	W67	Great Britain	21:08.25

==== W70 5000 metres ====
Pos	Athlete	Age	Country	Result
1st place, gold medalist(s)	Lavinia Petrie	W73	Australia	22:00.89
2nd place, silver medalist(s)	Nelis Mc Evelyn	W70	Ireland	24:37.71
3rd place, bronze medalist(s)	Pauline Rich	W71	Great Britain	25:44.77

==== W75 5000 metres ====
Pos	Athlete	Age	Country	Result
1st place, gold medalist(s)	Xuhua Chen	W76	China	25:56.79
2nd place, silver medalist(s)	Joaquina Flores	W76	Portugal	26:17.35
3rd place, bronze medalist(s)	Lorraine Lopes	W76	Australia	26:41.46

==== W80 5000 metres ====
Pos	Athlete	Age	Country	Result
1st place, gold medalist(s)	Denise Leclerc	W83	France	28:17.65
2nd place, silver medalist(s)	Anne Young	W81	Australia	39:03.18

==== W85 5000 metres ====
Pos	Athlete	Age	Country	Result
1st place, gold medalist(s)	Ruth Helfenstein	W85	Switzerland	43:29.32

=== Cross country ===
==== W35 8000 metres Cross Country ====
Pos	Athlete	Age	Country	Result
1st place, gold medalist(s)	Lauren Shelley	W39	Australia	31:49.57
2nd place, silver medalist(s)	Denise Tappatà	W36	Italy	32:28.26
3rd place, bronze medalist(s)	Vanessa Carson	W37	Australia	33:47.32

==== W40 8000 metres Cross Country ====
Pos	Athlete	Age	Country	Result
1st place, gold medalist(s)	Belinda Martin	W42	Australia	29:18.03
2nd place, silver medalist(s)	Cathy Mccourt	W43	Ireland	30:49.52
3rd place, bronze medalist(s)	Kate Seibold	W41	Australia	31:05.38

==== W45 8000 metres Cross Country ====
Pos	Athlete	Age	Country	Result
1st place, gold medalist(s)	Jenny Newton	W46	United States	32:32.94
2nd place, silver medalist(s)	Blomestein van Eulalia	W46	Australia	32:38.11
3rd place, bronze medalist(s)	Sarah Dawson	W49	Australia	32:39.88

==== W50 8000 metres Cross Country ====
Pos	Athlete	Age	Country	Result
1st place, gold medalist(s)	Lucy Elliott	W50	Great Britain	29:39.48
2nd place, silver medalist(s)	Sally Gibbs	W53	New Zealand	29:39.67
3rd place, bronze medalist(s)	Ulla Jacobsen Binderup	W51	Denmark	31:11.59

==== W55 8000 metres Cross Country ====
Pos	Athlete	Age	Country	Result
1st place, gold medalist(s)	Janet Ferguson	W55	Australia	33:12.61
2nd place, silver medalist(s)	Carolyn Smith	W56	New Zealand	35:30.09
3rd place, bronze medalist(s)	Helen Larmour	W57	Australia	35:47.82

==== W60 8000 metres Cross Country ====
Pos	Athlete	Age	Country	Result
1st place, gold medalist(s)	Margie Peat	W60	New Zealand	34:35.46
2nd place, silver medalist(s)	Rosemary Roediger	W62	Australia	36:13.37
3rd place, bronze medalist(s)	Birgit Gruner	W61	Germany	36:17.03

==== W65 8000 metres Cross Country ====
Pos	Athlete	Age	Country	Result
1st place, gold medalist(s)	Kathryn Martin	W65	United States	34:36.30
2nd place, silver medalist(s)	Janette Stevenson	W67	Great Britain	36:06.00
3rd place, bronze medalist(s)	Rosalind Tabor	W67	Great Britain	37:05.64

==== W70 8000 metres Cross Country ====
Pos	Athlete	Age	Country	Result
1st place, gold medalist(s)	Lavinia Petrie	W73	Australia	37:22.01
2nd place, silver medalist(s)	Mizue Matsuda	W70	Japan	41:55.40
3rd place, bronze medalist(s)	Nelis Mc Evelyn	W70	Ireland	41:57.31

==== W75 8000 metres Cross Country ====
Pos	Athlete	Age	Country	Result
1st place, gold medalist(s)	Joaquina Flores	W76	Portugal	44:52.92
2nd place, silver medalist(s)	Lorraine Lopes	W76	Australia	47:15.46
3rd place, bronze medalist(s)	Eva Carlsen	W76	Norway	51:02.30

==== W80 8000 metres Cross Country ====
Pos	Athlete	Age	Country	Result
1st place, gold medalist(s)	Mary Harada	W81	United States	59:46.00
2nd place, silver medalist(s)	Erika Krueger	W81	Germany	1:01:51.86
3rd place, bronze medalist(s)	Anne Young	W81	Australia	1:08:51.71

==== W85 8000 metres Cross Country ====
Pos	Athlete	Age	Country	Result
1st place, gold medalist(s)	Ruth Helfenstein	W85	Switzerland	1:15:17.71
2nd place, silver medalist(s)	Gwendoline Gleeson	W87	Australia	1:16:27.84

=== 10,000 metres ===
==== W35 10000 metres ====
Pos	Athlete	Age	Country	Result
1st place, gold medalist(s)	Anna Fitzgerald	W39	Australia	37:45.45
2nd place, silver medalist(s)	Patrycja Wlodarczyk	W36	Poland	38:35.77
3rd place, bronze medalist(s)	Denise Tappatà	W36	Italy	39:40.59

==== W40 10000 metres ====
Pos	Athlete	Age	Country	Result
1st place, gold medalist(s)	Belinda Martin	W42	Australia	36:32.78
2nd place, silver medalist(s)	Martina Schumacher	W40	Germany	38:05.37
3rd place, bronze medalist(s)	Cathy Mccourt	W43	Ireland	38:50.77

==== W45 10000 metres ====
Pos	Athlete	Age	Country	Result
1st place, gold medalist(s)	Hong Li	W46	China	38:07.61
2nd place, silver medalist(s)	Francesca Smith	W49	Australia	39:04.61
3rd place, bronze medalist(s)	Maria Faustina Ramos	W45	Spain	40:03.21

==== W50 10000 metres ====
Pos	Athlete	Age	Country	Result
1st place, gold medalist(s)	Sally Gibbs	W53	New Zealand	36:35.53
2nd place, silver medalist(s)	Karin Schoen	W54	Sweden	39:07.86
3rd place, bronze medalist(s)	Zohra Graziani	W50	France	39:26.38

==== W55 10000 metres ====
Pos	Athlete	Age	Country	Result
1st place, gold medalist(s)	Monica Regonesi	W55	Chile	41:00.87
2nd place, silver medalist(s)	Helen Larmour	W57	Australia	45:01.42
3rd place, bronze medalist(s)	Johanna Geyer	W57	South Africa	45:13.39

==== W60 10000 metres ====
Pos	Athlete	Age	Country	Result
1st place, gold medalist(s)	Danielle Justin	W64	Belgium	44:05.16
2nd place, silver medalist(s)	Elfie Huether	W62	Germany	44:57.63
3rd place, bronze medalist(s)	Maureen Moyle	W61	Australia	45:22.78

==== W65 10000 metres ====
Pos	Athlete	Age	Country	Result
1st place, gold medalist(s)	Kathryn Martin	W65	United States	42:34.97
2nd place, silver medalist(s)	Sanchez Vaquero Emi	W67	Spain	45:57.67
3rd place, bronze medalist(s)	Judith Stewart	W68	New Zealand	48:38.31

==== W70 10000 metres ====
Pos	Athlete	Age	Country	Result
1st place, gold medalist(s)	Lavinia Petrie	W73	Australia	46:10.17
2nd place, silver medalist(s)	Pauline Rich	W71	Great Britain	54:11.83
3rd place, bronze medalist(s)	Marisa Cruz	W73	Brazil	57:16.24

==== W75 10000 metres ====
Pos	Athlete	Age	Country	Result
1st place, gold medalist(s)	Joaquina Flores	W76	Portugal	54:19.91
2nd place, silver medalist(s)	Xuhua Chen	W76	China	56:06.57
3rd place, bronze medalist(s)	Carol Melling	W75	Australia	1:07:42.80

=== Half marathon ===
==== W35 Half marathon ====
Pos	Athlete	Age	Country	Result
1st place, gold medalist(s)	Lauren Shelley	W39	Australia	1:26:09
2nd place, silver medalist(s)	Lisa Rowe	W38	Australia	1:34:12
3rd place, bronze medalist(s)	Sonja Deiss	W38	Germany	1:36:46

==== W40 Half marathon ====
Pos	Athlete	Age	Country	Result
1st place, gold medalist(s)	Belinda Martin	W42	Australia	1:21:22
2nd place, silver medalist(s)	Cathy Mccourt	W43	Ireland	1:24:59
3rd place, bronze medalist(s)	Lucy Hodgson	W42	Great Britain	1:27:19

==== W45 Half marathon ====
Pos	Athlete	Age	Country	Result
1st place, gold medalist(s)	Carla Machado	W46	Portugal	1:22:07R
2nd place, silver medalist(s)	Hong Li	W46	China	1:23:12
3rd place, bronze medalist(s)	Francesca Smith	W49	Australia	1:25:50

==== W50 Half marathon ====
Pos	Athlete	Age	Country	Result
1st place, gold medalist(s)	Sally Gibbs	W53	New Zealand	1:22:02R
2nd place, silver medalist(s)	Zohra Graziani	W50	France	1:28:14
3rd place, bronze medalist(s)	Soliño Castro M. Soleda	W51	Spain	1:28:28

==== W55 Half marathon ====
Pos	Athlete	Age	Country	Result
1st place, gold medalist(s)	Robyn Basman	W57	Australia	1:30:45R
2nd place, silver medalist(s)	Janet Ferguson	W55	Australia	1:33:02
3rd place, bronze medalist(s)	Carmen Fuhrmann	W57	Germany	1:40:45

==== W60 Half marathon ====
Pos	Athlete	Age	Country	Result
1st place, gold medalist(s)	Johanna Clarkson	W61	Australia	1:42:50R
2nd place, silver medalist(s)	Helen Stanley	W61	Australia	1:43:16
3rd place, bronze medalist(s)	Joy Radford	W63	Great Britain	1:45:05

==== W65 Half marathon ====
Pos	Athlete	Age	Country	Result
1st place, gold medalist(s)	Kristiina Huttunen	W67	Finland	1:51:52R
2nd place, silver medalist(s)	Barbara Brown	W65	Great Britain	1:55:00
3rd place, bronze medalist(s)	Britt Hellmark	W66	Sweden	2:05:13

==== W70 Half marathon ====
Pos	Athlete	Age	Country	Result
1st place, gold medalist(s)	Lavinia Petrie	W73	Australia	1:41:00R
2nd place, silver medalist(s)	Socorro Perez	W71	Mexico	1:57:50
3rd place, bronze medalist(s)	Mizue Matsuda	W70	Japan	1:59:55

==== W75 Half marathon ====
Pos	Athlete	Age	Country	Result
1st place, gold medalist(s)	Jill Bower	W78	Australia	2:43:45

==== W80 Half marathon ====
Pos	Athlete	Age	Country	Result
1st place, gold medalist(s)	Erika Krueger	W81	Germany	2:54:10
2nd place, silver medalist(s)	Pamela Mews	W81	Australia	4:32:01

=== Marathon ===
==== W35 Marathon ====
Pos	Athlete	Age	Country	Result
1st place, gold medalist(s)	Christene Oosthuizen	W37	Australia	2:57:35
2nd place, silver medalist(s)	Denise Tappatà	W36	Italy	3:07:28
3rd place, bronze medalist(s)	Sally Matsubara	W37	Australia	3:21:04

==== W40 Marathon ====
Pos	Athlete	Age	Country	Result
1st place, gold medalist(s)	Katrin Vogler	W44	Germany	3:08:57
2nd place, silver medalist(s)	Katja Sorri	W41	Finland	3:19:23
3rd place, bronze medalist(s)	Julie Gardner	W42	Australia	3:19:36

==== W45 Marathon ====
Pos	Athlete	Age	Country	Result
1st place, gold medalist(s)	Maria Faustina Ramos	W45	Spain	3:12:00
2nd place, silver medalist(s)	Susan McDonald	W49	Great Britain	3:15:02
3rd place, bronze medalist(s)	Jo Newens	W46	Great Britain	3:26:35

==== W50 Marathon ====
Pos	Athlete	Age	Country	Result
1st place, gold medalist(s)	Ulla Jacobsen Binderup	W51	Denmark	3:02:50.00
2nd place, silver medalist(s)	Karin Schoen	W54	Sweden	3:09:37.00
3rd place, bronze medalist(s)	Elena Cigala-Fulgosi	W50	Canada	3:20:04.00

==== W55 Marathon ====
Pos	Athlete	Age	Country	Result
1st place, gold medalist(s)	Monica Regonesi	W55	Chile	3:26:45
2nd place, silver medalist(s)	Angelika Hofmann	W57	Germany	3:48:00
3rd place, bronze medalist(s)	Julie Lorian	W57	Australia	4:20:11

==== W60 Marathon ====
Pos	Athlete	Age	Country	Result
1st place, gold medalist(s)	Christine Pattinson	W60	Australia	3:47:54
2nd place, silver medalist(s)	Sara Gutiérrez Isabel	W62	Colombia	3:52:17
3rd place, bronze medalist(s)	Lorraine Bradbury	W61	Australia	3:53:59

==== W65 Marathon ====
Pos	Athlete	Age	Country	Result
1st place, gold medalist(s)	Luisa Rivas Inés	W65	Chile	3:33:03
2nd place, silver medalist(s)	Sanchez Vaquero Emi	W67	Spain	3:34:45
3rd place, bronze medalist(s)	Elizabeth Neville	W65	Great Britain	3:47:11

==== W70 Marathon ====
Pos	Athlete	Age	Country	Result
1st place, gold medalist(s)	Vera Nystad	W70	Norway	3:57:42
2nd place, silver medalist(s)	Brenda Kinch	W71	Great Britain	4:46:25

==== W75 Marathon ====
Pos	Athlete	Age	Country	Result
1st place, gold medalist(s)	Satsuko Suzuki	W75	Japan	5:47:44

=== Short hurdles ===
==== W40 80 metres hurdles ====
Wind: +2.5

Pos	Athlete	Age	Country	Result
1st place, gold medalist(s)	Rachel Guest	W41	United States	11.42
2nd place, silver medalist(s)	Marsha Baird	W42	Trinidad and Tobago	11.72
3rd place, bronze medalist(s)	Christine Müller	W40	Germany	13.40

==== W45 80 metres hurdles ====
Wind: +2.8

Pos	Athlete	Age	Country	Result
1st place, gold medalist(s)	Evelin Nagel	W45	Germany	12.04
2nd place, silver medalist(s)	Lenorë Lambert	W46	Australia	12.29
3rd place, bronze medalist(s)	Daalen van Aafke	W45	Netherlands	12.48

==== W50 80 metres hurdles ====
Wind: -1.0

Pos	Athlete	Age	Country	Result
1st place, gold medalist(s)	Menka Scott	W50	United States	12.84
2nd place, silver medalist(s)	Kirsti Siekkinen	W50	Finland	12.92
3rd place, bronze medalist(s)	Valentyna Krepkina	W51	Ukraine	13.08

==== W55 80 metres hurdles ====
Wind: +1.1

Pos	Athlete	Age	Country	Result
1st place, gold medalist(s)	Joy Upshaw	W55	United States	13.05
2nd place, silver medalist(s)	Sally Stagles	W56	Australia	13.26
3rd place, bronze medalist(s)	Michele Hossack	W56	Australia	13.92

==== W60 80 metres hurdles ====
Wind: +0.7

Pos	Athlete	Age	Country	Result
1st place, gold medalist(s)	Carole Filer	W60	Great Britain	13.52
2nd place, silver medalist(s)	Hildegard Vanhorenbeeck	W63	Belgium	14.76
3rd place, bronze medalist(s)	Ruth Pach	W63	Germany	16.46

==== W65 80 metres hurdles ====
Wind: -1.9

Pos	Athlete	Age	Country	Result
1st place, gold medalist(s)	Jean Fail	W67	Great Britain	15.86
2nd place, silver medalist(s)	Siling Bi	W65	China	15.94
3rd place, bronze medalist(s)	Wilma Perkins	W67	Australia	16.05

==== W70 80 metres hurdles ====
Wind: -0.9

Pos	Athlete	Age	Country	Result
1st place, gold medalist(s)	Fuen Teng	W70	China	15.93 (15.925)
2nd place, silver medalist(s)	Marianne Maier	W73	Austria	15.93 (15.927)
3rd place, bronze medalist(s)	Helgard Houben	W72	Germany	18.49

Note: Maier set the World Record of 15.72 -0.8 in the prelims

==== W75 80 metres hurdles ====
Wind: -0.1

Pos	Athlete	Age	Country	Result
1st place, gold medalist(s)	Frances Harris	W75	Australia	21.24

==== W80 80 metres hurdles ====
Wind: -0.1

Pos	Athlete	Age	Country	Result
1st place, gold medalist(s)	Irene Obera	W82	United States	18.70 WR
2nd place, silver medalist(s)	Christel Donley	W81	United States	21.50
3rd place, bronze medalist(s)	Hiroko Mabuchi	W80	Japan	31.38

==== W35 100 metres hurdles ====
Wind: +0.3

Pos	Athlete	Age	Country	Result
1st place, gold medalist(s)	Dedeh Erawati	W37	Indonesia	13.96
2nd place, silver medalist(s)	Laurence Guillet	W36	Belgium	15.28
3rd place, bronze medalist(s)	Jane Scott	W35	Great Britain	15.30

=== Long hurdles ===
==== W70 200 metres hurdles ====
Wind: +1.3

Pos	Athlete	Age	Country	Result
1st place, gold medalist(s)	Fuen Teng	W70	China	40.01
2nd place, silver medalist(s)	Karin Förster	W70	Germany	42.88
3rd place, bronze medalist(s)	Kerstin Nilsson	W74	Sweden	48.15

==== W75 200 metres hurdles ====
Wind: +2.3

Pos	Athlete	Age	Country	Result
1st place, gold medalist(s)	Frances Harris	W75	Australia	53.31

==== W80 200 metres hurdles ====
Wind: +2.3

Pos	Athlete	Age	Country	Result
1st place, gold medalist(s)	Irene Obera	W82	United States	47.02

==== W50 300 metres hurdles ====
Pos	Athlete	Age	Country	Result
1st place, gold medalist(s)	Gerda Andries	W51	Belgium	49.16
2nd place, silver medalist(s)	Geraldine Finegan	W51	Ireland	49.48
3rd place, bronze medalist(s)	Philippa Wight	W53	Australia	54.21

==== W55 300 metres hurdles ====
Pos	Athlete	Age	Country	Result
1st place, gold medalist(s)	Joy Upshaw	W55	United States	50.65
2nd place, silver medalist(s)	Machiko Yamazaki	W56	Japan	50.94
3rd place, bronze medalist(s)	Michele Hossack	W56	Australia	52.45

==== W60 300 metres hurdles ====
Pos	Athlete	Age	Country	Result
1st place, gold medalist(s)	Margaret Tweedie	W62	Australia	53.28
2nd place, silver medalist(s)	Carole Filer	W60	Great Britain	53.79
3rd place, bronze medalist(s)	Irenilta Nunes	W61	Brazil	1:04.61

==== W65 300 metres hurdles ====
Pos	Athlete	Age	Country	Result
1st place, gold medalist(s)	Siling Bi	W65	China	59.79
2nd place, silver medalist(s)	Terhi Kokkonen	W69	Finland	1:01.27
3rd place, bronze medalist(s)	Rieko Takahashi	W65	Japan	1:02.92

==== W35 400 metres hurdles ====
Pos	Athlete	Age	Country	Result
1st place, gold medalist(s)	Aanika Milne	W35	Australia	1:04.46
2nd place, silver medalist(s)	Den Van Bulk Jeannette	W39	Australia	1:06.37
3rd place, bronze medalist(s)	Lisa Edwards	W38	United States	1:08.81

==== W40 400 metres hurdles ====
Pos	Athlete	Age	Country	Result
1st place, gold medalist(s)	Sharon Davis	W43	Australia	1:08.06
2nd place, silver medalist(s)	Annmarie O'Donovan	W43	Australia	1:21.16
3rd place, bronze medalist(s)	Snehal Rajput Sanjay	W44	India	1:56.04

==== W45 400 metres hurdles ====
Pos	Athlete	Age	Country	Result
1st place, gold medalist(s)	Lenorë Lambert	W46	Australia	1:04.54
2nd place, silver medalist(s)	Lisa Daley	W46	United States	1:07.39
3rd place, bronze medalist(s)	Paola Olivari	W49	Chile	1:10.07

=== Steeplechase ===
==== W35 2000 metres steeplechase ====
Pos	Athlete	Age	Country	Result
1st place, gold medalist(s)	Danuta Woszczek	W38	Poland	7:05.24
2nd place, silver medalist(s)	Patrycja Wlodarczyk	W36	Poland	7:29.57
3rd place, bronze medalist(s)	Kathy Wellam	W37	Great Britain	7:43.87

==== W40 2000 metres steeplechase ====
Pos	Athlete	Age	Country	Result
1st place, gold medalist(s)	Claire Thompson	W40	Great Britain	7:25.49
2nd place, silver medalist(s)	Lisa Davis	W40	Australia	7:59.32
3rd place, bronze medalist(s)	Sandra Belva	W40	France	8:31.97

==== W45 2000 metres steeplechase ====
Pos	Athlete	Age	Country	Result
1st place, gold medalist(s)	María Guardeño Jimenez	W47	Spain	7:47.37
2nd place, silver medalist(s)	Paola Olivari	W49	Chile	8:05.46
3rd place, bronze medalist(s)	Julie Wilson	W49	Great Britain	8:10.23

==== W50 2000 metres steeplechase ====
Pos	Athlete	Age	Country	Result
1st place, gold medalist(s)	Zofia Wieciorkowska	W53	Poland	8:06.58
2nd place, silver medalist(s)	Carolyn Huell	W50	Australia	8:36.93
3rd place, bronze medalist(s)	Simone Solomon	W50	Australia	9:15.75

==== W55 2000 metres steeplechase ====
Pos	Athlete	Age	Country	Result
1st place, gold medalist(s)	Cheryl Bellaire	W57	United States	8:58.76
2nd place, silver medalist(s)	Overveld van Jeanine	W55	Netherlands	9:08.07
3rd place, bronze medalist(s)	Caroline Yarnell	W56	Australia	9:12.82

==== W60 2000 metres steeplechase ====
Pos	Athlete	Age	Country	Result
1st place, gold medalist(s)	Margaret Saunders	W62	Australia	9:21.63
2nd place, silver medalist(s)	Eliisa Reijonen	W63	Finland	10:37.18
3rd place, bronze medalist(s)	Cynthia Cliff	W63	Australia	10:55.00

==== W65 2000 metres steeplechase ====
Pos	Athlete	Age	Country	Result
1st place, gold medalist(s)	Kathryn Martin	W65	United States	8:57.54 WR
2nd place, silver medalist(s)	Gillian Young	W69	Australia	10:38.18
3rd place, bronze medalist(s)	Heather Carr	W67	Australia	10:50.02

==== W70 2000 metres steeplechase ====
Pos	Athlete	Age	Country	Result
1st place, gold medalist(s)	Anne Lang	W73	Australia	11:34.05
2nd place, silver medalist(s)	Miloslava Rocnakova	W71	Czech Republic	12:15.94
3rd place, bronze medalist(s)	Mei-Yun Yu	W70	Chinese Taipei	12:26.53

==== W75 2000 metres steeplechase ====
Pos	Athlete	Age	Country	Result
1st place, gold medalist(s)	Xuhua Chen	W76	China	11:30.55 WR
2nd place, silver medalist(s)	Frances Harris	W75	Australia	14:54.00
3rd place, bronze medalist(s)	Lynne Schickert	W75	Australia	16:59.78

==== W80 2000 metres steeplechase ====
Pos	Athlete	Age	Country	Result
1st place, gold medalist(s)	Anne Martin	W80	Great Britain	13:38.34 WR

==== W85 2000 metres steeplechase ====
Pos	Athlete	Age	Country	Result
1st place, gold medalist(s)	Clasina Van der Veeken	W85	New Zealand	18:30.80 WR

=== 4x100 metres relay ===
==== W35 4x100 metres relay ====
Pos	Country	Members/Age	Result
1st place, gold medalist(s)	United States	1) Ahndraea Allen 35 2) LaTisha Moulds 39; 3) Latesha Anderson-Short 35 4) LaTrica Dendy 43	49.21
2nd place, silver medalist(s)	Spain	1) Corinne Sandiford Damas 36 2) Elisabet Ruz 39; 3) Noemi Martinez Martinez 37 4) Carolina Garcia Garzon 37	53.41
3rd place, bronze medalist(s)	Great Britain	1) Jane Scott 35 2) Jacqueline Breslin 47; 3) Gaye Clarke 56 4) Jody Ward 37	55.91

==== W40 4x100 metres relay ====
Pos	Country	Members/Age	Result
1st place, gold medalist(s)	Australia	1) Ranell Hobson 44 2) Karen Long 41; 3) Lisa Limonas 47 4) Wendy Seegers 40	50.08
2nd place, silver medalist(s)	Germany	1) Evelin Nagel 45 2) Tatjana Schilling 46; 3) Simone Schwab 40 4) Heike Martin 44	50.34
3rd place, bronze medalist(s)	Latvia	1) Inara Fjodorova 51 2) Ludmila Nefjodova-Volkova 40; 3) Elga Babre 43 4) Linina Dace 40	55.54

==== W45 4x100 metres relay ====
Pos	Country	Members/Age	Result
1st place, gold medalist(s)	Australia	1) Lenorë Lambert 46 2) Delaney Janelle 46; 3) Jacinta Burns 48 4) Kylie Strong 49	51.05
2nd place, silver medalist(s)	Estonia	1) Mari Piir 47 2) Tiia Eeskivi 47; 3) Silja Mikk 48 4) Piret Granovskaja 47	53.65
3rd place, bronze medalist(s)	Italy	1) Laura Piras 52 2) Lacava Giusy 48; 3) Gigliola Giorgi 48 4) Simona Prunea 46	59.49

==== W50 4x100 metres relay ====
Pos	Country	Members/Age	Result
1st place, gold medalist(s)	Australia	1) Kathy Lawson 50 2) Stephanie Noon 50; 3) Vicki Townsend 52 4) Lynda Douglass 54	55.03
2nd place, silver medalist(s)	United States	1) Karen Maxwell 57 2) Menka Scott 50; 3) Diane Pierce 50 4) Joy Upshaw 55	55.71
3rd place, bronze medalist(s)	Germany	1) Katja Hasselberg 50 2) Iris Opitz 50; 3) Birgit Falkenhagen 51 4) Anke Straschewski 53	56.85

==== W55 4x100 metres relay ====
Pos	Country	Members/Age	Result
1st place, gold medalist(s)	Australia	1) Sue Bourke 56 2) Michele Hossack 56; 3) Christine Shaw 57 4) Gabrielle Whelan 55	56.82
2nd place, silver medalist(s)	Germany	1) Dorit Stehr 58 2) Angelika Grissmer 55; 3) Heidrun Müller 56 4) Heike Scheffler 56	1:02.03
3rd place, bronze medalist(s)	United States	1) Cheryl Bellaire 57 2) Karen Maxwell 57; 3) Donna Zukas 61 4) Lorraine Jasper 55	1:04.69

==== W65 4x100 metres relay ====
Pos	Country	Members/Age	Result
1st place, gold medalist(s)	Australia	1) Wilma Perkins 67 2) Lyn Peake 66; 3) Kathryn Heagney 66 4) Carol Davis 65	1:01.67
2nd place, silver medalist(s)	Germany	1) Karin Förster 70 2) Rita Buchholz 66; 3) Renate Richter Irmtraut 65 4) Sigrid Goessling 66	1:04.72
3rd place, bronze medalist(s)	New Zealand	1) Christine Waring 73 2) Lois Anderson 70; 3) Anne Deleiros 68 4) Sheryl Gower 69	1:06.32

==== W70 4x100 metres relay ====
Pos	Country	Members/Age	Result
1st place, gold medalist(s)	Australia	1) Brenda Painter 71 2) Marge Allison 72; 3) Anne Lang 73 4) Peggy Macliver 72	1:09.00
2nd place, silver medalist(s)	Finland	1) Marjatta Taipale 77 2) Janhunen Inkeri 75; 3) Seija Sario 75 4) Kirsti Viitanen 74	1:16.61
3rd place, bronze medalist(s)	Sweden	1) Astrid Nilsson 80 2) Sonja Nilsson 77; 3) Kerstin Nilsson 74 4) Kristina Karlsson 76	1:16.80

==== W75 4x100 metres relay ====
Pos	Country	Members/Age	Result
1st place, gold medalist(s)	Australia	1) Ruth Johnson 75 2) Miriam Cudmore 78; 3) Jo Klemke 79 4) Frances Harris 75	1:17.32

==== W80 4x100 metres relay ====
Pos	Country	Members/Age	Result
1st place, gold medalist(s)	United States	1) Christel Donley 81 2) Mary B. Roman 81; 3)) Jean Daprano 80 4) Irene Obera 82	1:30.66

=== 4x400 metres relay ===
==== W35 4x400 metres relay ====
Pos	Country	Members/Age	Result
1st place, gold medalist(s)	United States	1) Rachel Guest 41 2) Ahndraea Allen 35; 3) Lisa Edwards 38 4) LaTrica Dendy 43	4:00.07
2nd place, silver medalist(s)	Spain	1) Elisabet Ruz 39 2) Noemi Martinez Martinez 37; 3) Corinne Sandiford Damas 36 4) Carolina Garcia Garzon 37	4:11.19
3rd place, bronze medalist(s)	Australia	1) Ranell Hobson 44 2) Kate Dix 35; 3) Jane Lockwood 37 4) Jeannette Van Den Bulk 39	4:19.03

==== W40 4x400 metres relay ====
Pos	Country	Members/Age	Result
1st place, gold medalist(s)	Australia	1) Sharon Davis 43 2) Kriszta Kovacs 43; 3) Karen Long 41 4) Wendy Seegers 40	4:06.32
2nd place, silver medalist(s)	United States	1) Lisa Daley 46 2) Maurelhena Walles 42; 3) Christine Gentile 46 4) Cynthia McNamee 41	4:09.77
3rd place, bronze medalist(s)	Germany	1) Simone Schwab 40 2) Michaela Zwiener 46; 3) Jutta Bergener 47 4) Tatjana Schilling 46	4:22.80

==== W45 4x400 metres relay ====
Pos	Country	Members/Age	Result
1st place, gold medalist(s)	Australia	1) Lenorë Lambert 46 2) Petrina Brown 48; 3) Kylie Strong 49 4) Janelle Delaney 46	4:14.77
2nd place, silver medalist(s)	Estonia	1) Piret Granovskaja 47 2) Silja Mikk 48; 3) Erge Viiklaid 48 4) Tiia Eeskivi 47	4:27.72
3rd place, bronze medalist(s)	Italy	1) Vittoriana Gariboldi 51 2) Gigliola Giorgi 48; 3) Giusy Lacava 48 4) Simona Prunea 46	4:29.36

==== W50 4x400 metres relay ====
Pos	Country	Members/Age	Result
1st place, gold medalist(s)	Australia	1) Philippa Wight 53 2) Donna Burgess 54; 3) Michelle King 51 4) Fiona Leonard 50	4:34.76
2nd place, silver medalist(s)	South Africa	1) Emmarie Theunissen 55 2) Jeanette Carlisle 55; 3) Liz Alexander 61 4) Salome Vermeulen 50	4:43.75
3rd place, bronze medalist(s)	Germany	1) Iris Opitz 50 2) Birgit Falkenhagen 51; 3) Elisabeth Henn 59 4) Vera Schoormann 51	4:59.94

==== W55 4x400 metres relay ====
Pos	Country	Members/Age	Result
1st place, gold medalist(s)	Australia	1) Sue Bourke 56 2) Victoria Gunn 55; 3) Gabrielle Whelan 55 4) Michele Hossack 56	4:37.85
2nd place, silver medalist(s)	United States	1) Cheryl Bellaire 57 2) Karen Maxwell 57; 3) Joy Upshaw 55 4) Lorraine Jasper 55	4:48.86
3rd place, bronze medalist(s)	Germany	1) Heike Scheffler 56 2) Heidrun Müller 56; 3) Angelika Grissmer 55 4) Dorit Stehr 58	5:11.92

==== W60 4x400 metres relay ====
Pos	Country	Members/Age	Result
1st place, gold medalist(s)	Australia	1) Margaret Tweedie 62 2) Margaret Saunders 62; 3) Leanne Monk 60 4) Jeanette Flynn 64	5:07.03
2nd place, silver medalist(s)	Germany	1) Thoma Ingeborg 64 2) Rita Buchholz 66; 3) Ruth Pach 63 4) Rita Schubert 62	5:28.20
3rd place, bronze medalist(s)	New Zealand	1) Sheryl Gower 69 2) Lois Anderson 70; 3) Dalise Sanderson 61 4) Christine Waring 73	5:43.16

==== W65 4x400 metres relay ====
Pos	Country	Members/Age	Result
1st place, gold medalist(s)	Australia	1) Paula Moorhouse 67 2) Carol Davis 65; 3) Kathryn Heagney 66 4) Lyn Peake 66	5:06.10
2nd place, silver medalist(s)	Great Britain	1) Rosalind Tabor 67 2) Janette Stevenson 67; 3) Hendricka White 66 4) Caroline Marler 65	5:12.77R
3rd place, bronze medalist(s)	United States	1) Kathryn Martin 65 2) Mary Trotto 69; 3) Sabra Harvey 67 4) Coreen Steinbach 65	6:01.47

==== W70 4x400 metres relay ====
Pos	Country	Members/Age	Result
1st place, gold medalist(s)	Australia	1) Peggy Macliver 72 2) Anne Lang 73; 3) Jean Hampson 71 4) Marge Allison 72	5:56.24
2nd place, silver medalist(s)	Finland	1) Kirsti Viitanen 74 2) Marjatta Taipale 77; 3) Riitta Virtanen 72 4) Janhunen Inkeri 75	7:38.44
3rd place, bronze medalist(s)	Japan	1) Mizue Matsuda 70 2) Hiroko Mabuchi 80; 3) Tomoko Kanari 75 4) Ikuko Suzuki 79	8:20.50

==== W75 4x400 metres relay ====
Pos	Country	Members/Age	Result
1st place, gold medalist(s)	Australia	1) Ruth Johnson 75 2) Corinne Collins 80; 3) Jo Klemke 79 4) Carol Melling 75	7:11.20
2nd place, silver medalist(s)	Great Britain	1) Kathleen Stewart 77 2) Betty Stracey 77; 3) Anne Martin 80 4) Dorothy Fraser 79	7:25.65

==== W80 4x400 metres relay ====
Pos	Country	Members/Age	Result
1st place, gold medalist(s)	United States	1) Mary Harada 81 2) Christel Donley 81; 3)) Irene Obera 82 4) Jean Daprano 80	8:26.42 WR

=== High Jump ===
==== W35 High Jump ====
Pos	Athlete	Age	Country	Result
1st place, gold medalist(s)	Fukumoto Miyuki	W39	Japan	1.73 m (5 ft 8 in)
2nd place, silver medalist(s)	Audrey Hustache	W38	France	1.66 m (5 ft 5 1/4 in)
3rd place, bronze medalist(s)	Cristina Paganelli	W36	Italy	1.56 m (5 ft 1 1/4 in)

==== W40 High Jump ====
Pos	Athlete	Age	Country	Result
1st place, gold medalist(s)	Dace Linina	W40	Latvia	1.48 m (4 ft 10 1/4 in)
2nd place, silver medalist(s)	Jenni Cotter	W42	Australia	1.44 m (4 ft 8 1/2 in)
3rd place, bronze medalist(s)	Aleisha Sutton	W41	Australia	1.36 m (4 ft 5 1/2 in)

==== W45 High Jump ====
Pos	Athlete	Age	Country	Result
1st place, gold medalist(s)	Tatjana Schilling	W46	Germany	1.63 m (5 ft 4 in)
2nd place, silver medalist(s)	Aycan Kurtcan	W48	Turkey	1.53 m (5 ft 0 in)
3rd place, bronze medalist(s)	Lenorë Lambert	W46	Australia	1.50 m (4 ft 11 in)

==== W50 High Jump ====
Pos	Athlete	Age	Country	Result
1st place, gold medalist(s)	Monica Buizza	W50	Italy	1.47 m (4 ft 9 3/4 in)
2nd place, silver medalist(s)	Kirsti Siekkinen	W50	Finland	1.45 m (4 ft 9 in)
3rd place, bronze medalist(s)	Geraldine Finegan	W51	Ireland	1.45 m (4 ft 9 in)

==== W55 High Jump ====
Pos	Athlete	Age	Country	Result
1st place, gold medalist(s)	Ramona Pfeiffer	W55	Germany	1.46 m (4 ft 9 1/4 in)
2nd place, silver medalist(s)	Michele Hossack	W56	Australia	1.41 m (4 ft 7 1/2 in)
3rd place, bronze medalist(s)	Gaye Clarke	W56	Great Britain	1.31 m (4 ft 3 1/2 in)

==== W60 High Jump ====
Pos	Athlete	Age	Country	Result
1st place, gold medalist(s)	Carole Filer	W60	Great Britain	1.35 m (4 ft 5 in)
2nd place, silver medalist(s)	Marlene Reid	W61	Australia	1.24 m (4 ft 3/4 in)
3rd place, bronze medalist(s)	Ruth Pach	W63	Germany	1.18 m (3 ft 10 1/4 in)

==== W65 High Jump ====
Pos	Athlete	Age	Country	Result
1st place, gold medalist(s)	Renate Richter Irmtraut	W65	Germany	1.20 m (3 ft 11 in)
2nd place, silver medalist(s)	Margaret Taylor	W68	Australia	1.20 m (3 ft 11 in)
3rd place, bronze medalist(s)	Wilma Perkins	W67	Australia	1.15 m (3 ft 9 1/4 in)

==== W70 High Jump ====
Pos	Athlete	Age	Country	Result
1st place, gold medalist(s)	Marianne Maier	W73	Austria	1.18 m (3 ft 10 1/4 in)
2nd place, silver medalist(s)	Fuen Teng	W70	China	1.15 m (3 ft 9 1/4 in)
3rd place, bronze medalist(s)	Kirsten Onsberg	W72	Denmark	1.12 m (3 ft 8 in)

==== W75 High Jump ====
Pos	Athlete	Age	Country	Result
1st place, gold medalist(s)	Kathy Bergen	W76	United States	1.22 m (4 ft 0 in)R
2nd place, silver medalist(s)	Seija Sario	W75	Finland	1.07 m (3 ft 6 in)
3rd place, bronze medalist(s)	Sonja Nilsson	W77	Sweden	0.98

==== W80 High Jump ====
Pos	Athlete	Age	Country	Result
1st place, gold medalist(s)	Hiroko Mabuchi	W80	Japan	1.03 m (3 ft 4 1/2 in)
2nd place, silver medalist(s)	Christel Donley	W81	United States	1.03 m (3 ft 4 1/2 in)
3rd place, bronze medalist(s)	Irene Obera	W82	United States	0.95 m (3 ft 1 1/4 in)

=== Pole Vault ===
==== W35 Pole Vault ====
Pos	Athlete	Age	Country	Result
1st place, gold medalist(s)	Catherine MacRae	W37	Australia	3.40 m (11 ft 1 3/4 in)
2nd place, silver medalist(s)	Montserrat Ros	W38	Australia	3.10 m (10 ft 2 in)
2nd place, silver medalist(s)	Severine Plunus	W37	Belgium	3.10 m (10 ft 2 in)

==== W40 Pole Vault ====
Pos	Athlete	Age	Country	Result
1st place, gold medalist(s)	Kristy Harris	W42	United States	2.70 m (8 ft 10 1/4 in)
2nd place, silver medalist(s)	Katrin Friedrich	W41	Germany	2.50 m (8 ft 2 1/4 in)
3rd place, bronze medalist(s)	Donna Egglestone	W43	Australia	1.60 m (5 ft 2 3/4 in)

==== W45 Pole Vault ====
Pos	Athlete	Age	Country	Result
1st place, gold medalist(s)	Irie Hill	W47	Great Britain	3.50 m (11 ft 5 3/4 in)
2nd place, silver medalist(s)	Christina Ziemann	W48	Germany	3.10 m (10 ft 2 in)
3rd place, bronze medalist(s)	Jacinta Burns	W48	Australia	2.90 m (9 ft 6 in)

==== W50 Pole Vault ====
Pos	Athlete	Age	Country	Result
1st place, gold medalist(s)	Valentyna Krepkina	W51	Ukraine	3.00 m (9 ft 10 in)
2nd place, silver medalist(s)	Linda Buttigieg	W52	Australia	2.90 m (9 ft 6 in)
3rd place, bronze medalist(s)	Gerda Andries	W51	Belgium	2.20 m (7 ft 2 1/2 in)

==== W55 Pole Vault ====
Pos	Athlete	Age	Country	Result
1st place, gold medalist(s)	Brigitte van de Kamp	W56	Netherlands	3.00 m (9 ft 10 in)
2nd place, silver medalist(s)	Dawn Hartigan	W59	Australia	2.90 m (9 ft 6 in)
2nd place, silver medalist(s)	Machiko Yamazaki	W56	Japan	2.90 m (9 ft 6 in)

==== W60 Pole Vault ====
Pos	Athlete	Age	Country	Result
1st place, gold medalist(s)	Sue Yeomans	W63	Great Britain	2.75 m (9 ft 1/4 in)
2nd place, silver medalist(s)	Sue Dassie	W63	Great Britain	2.15 m (7 ft 1/2 in)
3rd place, bronze medalist(s)	Leann Monk	W60	Australia	2.00 m (6 ft 6 1/2 in)

==== W65 Pole Vault ====
Pos	Athlete	Age	Country	Result
1st place, gold medalist(s)	Wilma Perkins	W67	Australia	2.10 m (6 ft 10 1/2 in)
2nd place, silver medalist(s)	Birgitta Uppgarden	W68	Sweden	1.70 m (5 ft 6 3/4 in)
2nd place, silver medalist(s)	Mirtha Perez	W68	Chile	1.70 m (5 ft 6 3/4 in)

==== W70 Pole Vault ====
Pos	Athlete	Age	Country	Result
1st place, gold medalist(s)	Karin Förster	W70	Germany	2.10 m (6 ft 10 1/2 in)
2nd place, silver medalist(s)	Kirsti Viitanen	W74	Finland	1.90 m (6 ft 2 3/4 in)

=== Long Jump ===
==== W35 Long Jump ====
Pos	Athlete	Age	Country	Result Wind
1st place, gold medalist(s)	Marestella Sunang	W35	Philippines	6.11 m (20 ft 1/2 in)w +2.5
2nd place, silver medalist(s)	Melissa Foster	W38	Australia	5.74 m (18 ft 9 3/4 in) -2.0
3rd place, bronze medalist(s)	Cristina Paganelli	W36	Italy	5.65 m (18 ft 6 1/4 in) -1.1

==== W40 Long Jump ====
Pos	Athlete	Age	Country	Result Wind
1st place, gold medalist(s)	Marsha Baird	W42	Trinidad and Tobago	5.57 m (18 ft 3 1/4 in) +1.5
2nd place, silver medalist(s)	Nataliia Sorokina	W41	Ukraine	5.49 m (18 ft 0 in) +0.5
3rd place, bronze medalist(s)	Renata Szykulska	W42	Poland	5.29 m (17 ft 4 1/4 in) +1.3

==== W45 Long Jump ====
Pos	Athlete	Age	Country	Result Wind
1st place, gold medalist(s)	Tatjana Schilling	W46	Germany	5.35 m (17 ft 6 1/2 in) +0.9
2nd place, silver medalist(s)	Lenorë Lambert	W46	Australia	5.23 m (17 ft 1 3/4 in) 0.0
3rd place, bronze medalist(s)	Kylie Strong	W49	Australia	5.01 m (16 ft 5 in) +0.8

==== W50 Long Jump ====
Pos	Athlete	Age	Country	Result Wind
1st place, gold medalist(s)	Kirsti Siekkinen	W50	Finland	5.11 m (16 ft 9 in) +0.7
2nd place, silver medalist(s)	Valentyna Krepkina	W51	Ukraine	5.04 m (16 ft 6 1/4 in) +0.0
3rd place, bronze medalist(s)	Menka Scott	W50	United States	5.04 m (16 ft 6 1/4 in) -0.1

==== W55 Long Jump ====
Pos	Athlete	Age	Country	Result Wind
1st place, gold medalist(s)	Joy Upshaw	W55	United States	4.92 m (16 ft 1 1/2 in)w +2.4
2nd place, silver medalist(s)	Ramona Pfeiffer	W55	Germany	4.89 m (16 ft 1/2 in)w +2.0
3rd place, bronze medalist(s)	Marie Kay	W56	Australia	4.62 m (15 ft 1 3/4 in) +0.1

==== W60 Long Jump ====
Pos	Athlete	Age	Country	Result Wind
1st place, gold medalist(s)	Carole Filer	W60	Great Britain	4.62 m (15 ft 1 3/4 in)w +2.6
2nd place, silver medalist(s)	Margaret Tweedie	W62	Australia	4.34 m (14 ft 2 3/4 in) +0.9
3rd place, bronze medalist(s)	Marlene Reid	W61	Australia	4.22 m (13 ft 10 in) +1.9

==== W65 Long Jump ====
Pos	Athlete	Age	Country	Result Wind
1st place, gold medalist(s)	Wilma Perkins	W67	Australia	3.99 m (13 ft 1 in)w +2.7
2nd place, silver medalist(s)	Margaret Taylor	W68	Australia	3.88 m (12 ft 8 3/4 in) 1+.5
3rd place, bronze medalist(s)	Siling Bi	W65	China	3.78 m (12 ft 4 3/4 in) +1.6

==== W70 Long Jump ====
Pos	Athlete	Age	Country	Result Wind
1st place, gold medalist(s)	Marianne Maier	W73	Austria	3.73 m (12 ft 2 3/4 in) 0.0
2nd place, silver medalist(s)	Karin Förster	W70	Germany	3.45 m (11 ft 3 3/4 in) 0.0
3rd place, bronze medalist(s)	Fuen Teng	W70	China	3.21 m (10 ft 6 1/4 in) 0.0

==== W75 Long Jump ====
Pos	Athlete	Age	Country	Result Wind
1st place, gold medalist(s)	Miriam Cudmore	W78	Australia	3.15 m (10 ft 4 in) +1.5
2nd place, silver medalist(s)	Iris Holder	W75	Great Britain	3.05 m (10 ft 0 in) 0.0
3rd place, bronze medalist(s)	Ruth Johnson	W75	Australia	2.82 m (9 ft 3 in) 0.0

==== W80 Long Jump ====
Pos	Athlete	Age	Country	Result Wind
1st place, gold medalist(s)	Irene Obera	W82	United States	2.60 m (8 ft 6 1/4 in) 0.0
2nd place, silver medalist(s)	Anne Martin	W80	Great Britain	2.43 m (7 ft 11 1/2 in) 0.0
3rd place, bronze medalist(s)	Christel Donley	W81	United States	2.37 m (7 ft 9 1/4 in) 0.0

==== W85 Long Jump ====
Pos	Athlete	Age	Country	Result
1st place, gold medalist(s)	Clasina Van der Veeken	W85	New Zealand	1.84 m (6 ft 1/4 in) 0.0
2nd place, silver medalist(s)	Maria Matulessy Alberti	W86	Indonesia	1.34 m (4 ft 4 3/4 in) 0.0

=== Triple Jump ===
==== W35 Triple Jump ====
Pos	Athlete	Age	Country	Result Wind
1st place, gold medalist(s)	Melissa Foster	W38	Australia	11.42 m (37 ft 5 1/2 in) +1.3
2nd place, silver medalist(s)	Audrey Hustache	W38	France	10.95 m (35 ft 11 in) +1.9
3rd place, bronze medalist(s)	Gunild Kreb	W35	Germany	10.81 m (35 ft 5 1/2 in) +1.7

==== W40 Triple Jump ====
Pos	Athlete	Age	Country	Result Wind
1st place, gold medalist(s)	Renata Szykulska	W42	Poland	11.48 m (37 ft 7 3/4 in)w +3.3
2nd place, silver medalist(s)	Ayano Murayoshi	W40	Japan	10.87 m (35 ft 7 3/4 in)w +2.3
3rd place, bronze medalist(s)	Anne-Catherine Clement	W41	Belgium	10.51 m (34 ft 5 3/4 in)w +2.8

==== W45 Triple Jump ====
Pos	Athlete	Age	Country	Result Wind
1st place, gold medalist(s)	Ana Mrcic	W49	Croatia	10.34 m (33 ft 11 in) +1.8
2nd place, silver medalist(s)	Gaelyne Kenshole	W46	Australia	9.88 m (32 ft 4 3/4 in) +1.6
3rd place, bronze medalist(s)	Lisa Limonas	W47	Australia	9.74 m (31 ft 11 1/4 in) +1.6

==== W50 Triple Jump ====
Pos	Athlete	Age	Country	Result Wind
1st place, gold medalist(s)	Valentyna Krepkina	W51	Ukraine	10.88 m (35 ft 8 1/4 in)w +4.3
2nd place, silver medalist(s)	Kirsti Siekkinen	W50	Finland	10.37 m (34 ft 1/4 in)w +2.0
3rd place, bronze medalist(s)	Reeth Abraham	W54	India	10.23 m (33 ft 6 3/4 in)w +3.6

==== W55 Triple Jump ====
Pos	Athlete	Age	Country	Result Wind
1st place, gold medalist(s)	Anna-Liisa Salminen	W59	Finland	9.65 m (31 ft 7 3/4 in) +1.5
2nd place, silver medalist(s)	Annika Savolainen	W57	Finland	9.57 m (31 ft 4 3/4 in) NWI
3rd place, bronze medalist(s)	Zuzana Pumprlova	W56	Czech Republic	8.75 m (28 ft 8 1/4 in) NWI

==== W60 Triple Jump ====
Pos	Athlete	Age	Country	Result Wind
1st place, gold medalist(s)	Margaret Tweedie	W62	Australia	8.75 m (28 ft 8 1/4 in)w +3.2
2nd place, silver medalist(s)	Irenilta Nunes	W61	Brazil	8.44 m (27 ft 8 1/4 in)w +3.6
3rd place, bronze medalist(s)	Dace Brakanska	W62	Latvia	7.68 m (25 ft 2 1/4 in)w +2.4

==== W65 Triple Jump ====
Pos	Athlete	Age	Country	Result Wind
1st place, gold medalist(s)	Margaret Taylor	W68	Australia	8.44 m (27 ft 8 1/4 in)w +3.0
2nd place, silver medalist(s)	Terhi Kokkonen	W69	Finland	8.39 m (27 ft 6 1/4 in)w +4.1
3rd place, bronze medalist(s)	Siling Bi	W65	China	8.07 m (26 ft 5 1/2 in) +1.8

==== W70 Triple Jump ====
Pos	Athlete	Age	Country	Result Wind
1st place, gold medalist(s)	Helgard Houben	W72	Germany	7.03 m (23 ft 3/4 in)w +2.2
2nd place, silver medalist(s)	Kirsti Viitanen	W74	Finland	6.82 m (22 ft 4 1/2 in)w +4.7
3rd place, bronze medalist(s)	Patricia Oakes	W70	Great Britain	6.41 m (21 ft 1/4 in)w +2.4

==== W75 Triple Jump ====
Pos	Athlete	Age	Country	Result Wind
1st place, gold medalist(s)	Miriam Cudmore	W78	Australia	7.15 m (23 ft 5 1/4 in)w +2.8
2nd place, silver medalist(s)	Iris Holder	W75	Great Britain	7.07 m (23 ft 2 1/4 in) +1.7
3rd place, bronze medalist(s)	Ruth Johnson	W75	Australia	6.03 m (19 ft 9 1/4 in)w +2.3

==== W80 Triple Jump ====
Pos	Athlete	Age	Country	Result Wind
1st place, gold medalist(s)	Christel Donley	W81	United States	5.87 m (19 ft 3 in)w +3.0
2nd place, silver medalist(s)	Irene Obera	W82	United States	5.74 m (18 ft 9 3/4 in)w +3.7
3rd place, bronze medalist(s)	Anne Martin	W80	Great Britain	5.35 m (17 ft 6 1/2 in)w +4.3

==== W85 Triple Jump ====
Pos	Athlete	Age	Country	Result Wind
1st place, gold medalist(s)	Clasina Van der Veeken	W85	New Zealand	3.87 m (12 ft 8 1/4 in)w +3.0
2nd place, silver medalist(s)	Maria Matulessy Alberti	W86	Indonesia	2.88 m (9 ft 5 1/4 in) +1.8

=== Shot Put ===
==== W35 Shot Put ====
Pos	Athlete	Age	Country	Result
1st place, gold medalist(s)	Johanna Leivonen	W39	Finland	11.81 m (38 ft 8 3/4 in)
2nd place, silver medalist(s)	Emma Puletaha	W39	New Zealand	11.39 m (37 ft 4 1/4 in)
3rd place, bronze medalist(s)	Gunild Kreb	W35	Germany	11.38 m (37 ft 4 in)

==== W40 Shot Put ====
Pos	Athlete	Age	Country	Result
1st place, gold medalist(s)	Vera Yepimashka	W40	Belarus	14.20 m (46 ft 7 in)
2nd place, silver medalist(s)	Geraldine George	W44	Trinidad and Tobago	11.31 m (37 ft 1 1/4 in)
3rd place, bronze medalist(s)	Kirsi Koro	W40	Finland	10.71 m (35 ft 1 1/2 in)

==== W45 Shot Put ====
Pos	Athlete	Age	Country	Result
1st place, gold medalist(s)	Tatjana Schilling	W46	Germany	10.83 m (35 ft 6 1/4 in)
2nd place, silver medalist(s)	Kimberly Lindner	W45	United States	10.62 m (34 ft 10 in)
3rd place, bronze medalist(s)	Brenda Davis	W47	New Zealand	10.20 m (33 ft 5 1/2 in)

==== W50 Shot Put ====
Pos	Athlete	Age	Country	Result
1st place, gold medalist(s)	Marcela Barrientos	W51	Chile	14.19 m (46 ft 6 1/2 in)
2nd place, silver medalist(s)	Rajwinder Singh	W50	Australia	12.74 m (41 ft 9 1/2 in)
3rd place, bronze medalist(s)	Raylene Bates	W50	New Zealand	12.58 m (41 ft 3 1/4 in)

==== W55 Shot Put ====
Pos	Athlete	Age	Country	Result
1st place, gold medalist(s)	Lea Vahter	W55	Estonia	12.94 m (42 ft 5 1/4 in)
2nd place, silver medalist(s)	Carol Finsrud	W59	United States	10.41 m (34 ft 1 3/4 in)
3rd place, bronze medalist(s)	Zuzana Pumprlova	W56	Czech Republic	9.80 m (32 ft 1 3/4 in)

==== W60 Shot Put ====
Pos	Athlete	Age	Country	Result
1st place, gold medalist(s)	Siv Karlstrom	W60	Finland	10.36 m (33 ft 11 3/4 in)
2nd place, silver medalist(s)	Anne Jensen Kirstine	W62	Denmark	9.94 m (32 ft 7 1/4 in)
3rd place, bronze medalist(s)	Barbara Schlosser	W60	Germany	9.87 m (32 ft 4 1/2 in)

==== W65 Shot Put ====
Pos	Athlete	Age	Country	Result
1st place, gold medalist(s)	Genovaite Kazlauskiene	W66	Lithuania	11.23 m (36 ft 10 in)
2nd place, silver medalist(s)	Vilma Thompson	W65	Great Britain	9.71 m (31 ft 10 1/4 in)
3rd place, bronze medalist(s)	Miriam Finochietti	W69	Uruguay	8.98 m (29 ft 5 1/2 in)

==== W70 Shot Put ====
Pos	Athlete	Age	Country	Result
1st place, gold medalist(s)	Marianne Maier	W73	Austria	10.30 m (33 ft 9 1/2 in)
2nd place, silver medalist(s)	Mary Thomas	W72	Australia	7.93 m (26 ft 0 in)
3rd place, bronze medalist(s)	Barbara Austin	W71	New Zealand	7.86 m (25 ft 9 1/4 in)

==== W75 Shot Put ====
Pos	Athlete	Age	Country	Result
1st place, gold medalist(s)	Tomoko Kanari	W75	Japan	10.43 m (34 ft 2 1/2 in)
2nd place, silver medalist(s)	Tserendolgor Tumurbat	W78	Mongolia	9.82 m (32 ft 2 1/2 in)
3rd place, bronze medalist(s)	Imoto Yamakawa Sumiko	W78	Brazil	9.09 m (29 ft 9 3/4 in)

==== W80 Shot Put ====
Pos	Athlete	Age	Country	Result
1st place, gold medalist(s)	Doris Herrera	W80	Chile	7.48 m (24 ft 6 1/4 in)
2nd place, silver medalist(s)	Mary B. Roman	W81	United States	7.37 m (24 ft 2 in)
3rd place, bronze medalist(s)	Christel Donley	W81	United States	7.22 m (23 ft 8 1/4 in)

==== W85 Shot Put ====
Pos	Athlete	Age	Country	Result
1st place, gold medalist(s)	Christiane Dauphinet	W85	Australia	4.69 m (15 ft 4 1/2 in)

==== W90 Shot Put ====
Pos	Athlete	Age	Country	Result
1st place, gold medalist(s)	Shirley Dietderich	W90	United States	2.54 m (8 ft 4 in)

==== W95 Shot Put ====
Pos	Athlete	Age	Country	Result
1st place, gold medalist(s)	Elfriede Fuchs	W96	Austria	4.07 m (13 ft 4 in)

=== Discus Throw ===
==== W35 Discus Throw ====
Pos	Athlete	Age	Country	Result
1st place, gold medalist(s)	Kelly Hunter	W39	Australia	39.70 m (130 ft 2 in)
2nd place, silver medalist(s)	Jindriska Noasova	W38	Czech Republic	34.51 m (113 ft 2 in)
3rd place, bronze medalist(s)	Johanna Leivonen	W39	Finland	33.24 m (109 ft 0 in)

==== W40 Discus Throw ====
Pos	Athlete	Age	Country	Result
1st place, gold medalist(s)	Bettina Schardt	W44	Germany	44.06 m (144 ft 6 in)
2nd place, silver medalist(s)	Elizabeth Teague	W42	United States	39.76 m (130 ft 5 in)
3rd place, bronze medalist(s)	Geraldine George	W44	Trinidad and Tobago	39.38 m (129 ft 2 in)

==== W45 Discus Throw ====
Pos	Athlete	Age	Country	Result
1st place, gold medalist(s)	Malgorzata Krzyzan	W48	Poland	43.52 m (142 ft 9 in)
2nd place, silver medalist(s)	Silke Stolt	W49	Germany	37.58 m (123 ft 3 in)
3rd place, bronze medalist(s)	Kimberly Lindner	W45	United States	32.46 m (106 ft 5 in)

==== W50 Discus Throw ====
Pos	Athlete	Age	Country	Result
1st place, gold medalist(s)	Marcela Barrientos	W51	Chile	40.96 m (134 ft 4 in)
2nd place, silver medalist(s)	Raylene Bates	W50	New Zealand	36.23 m (118 ft 10 in)
3rd place, bronze medalist(s)	Ellen Weller	W50	Germany	34.48 m (113 ft 1 in)

==== W55 Discus Throw ====
Pos	Athlete	Age	Country	Result
1st place, gold medalist(s)	Jorunn Hole Tangen	W55	Norway	39.26 m (128 ft 9 in)
2nd place, silver medalist(s)	Lea Vahter	W55	Estonia	38.01 m (124 ft 8 in)
3rd place, bronze medalist(s)	Carol Finsrud	W59	United States	31.86 m (104 ft 6 in)

==== W60 Discus Throw ====
Pos	Athlete	Age	Country	Result
1st place, gold medalist(s)	Anne Jensen Kirstine	W62	Denmark	29.52 m (96 ft 10 in)
2nd place, silver medalist(s)	Dorn Jenkins	W61	Australia	29.01 m (95 ft 2 in)
3rd place, bronze medalist(s)	Barbara Schlosser	W60	Germany	27.15 m (89 ft 0 in)

==== W65 Discus Throw ====
Pos	Athlete	Age	Country	Result
1st place, gold medalist(s)	Inge Faldager	W68	Denmark	29.33 m (96 ft 2 in)
2nd place, silver medalist(s)	Margarethe Tomanek	W67	Belgium	27.04 m (88 ft 8 in)
3rd place, bronze medalist(s)	Monika Hedderich	W69	Germany	26.20 m (85 ft 11 in)

==== W70 Discus Throw ====
Pos	Athlete	Age	Country	Result
1st place, gold medalist(s)	Mary Thomas	W72	Australia	23.13 m (75 ft 10 in)
2nd place, silver medalist(s)	Beverley Hamilton	W70	Australia	22.07 m (72 ft 4 in)
3rd place, bronze medalist(s)	Lorraine Birtwell	W73	Australia	19.19 m (62 ft 11 in)

==== W75 Discus Throw ====
Pos	Athlete	Age	Country	Result
1st place, gold medalist(s)	Tomoko Kanari	W75	Japan	24.51 m (80 ft 4 in)
2nd place, silver medalist(s)	Imoto Yamakawa Sumiko	W78	Brazil	22.04 m (72 ft 3 in)
3rd place, bronze medalist(s)	Tserendolgor Tumurbat	W78	Mongolia	21.92 m (71 ft 10 in)

==== W80 Discus Throw ====
Pos	Athlete	Age	Country	Result
1st place, gold medalist(s)	Heather Doherty	W83	Australia	20.22 m (66 ft 4 in)
2nd place, silver medalist(s)	Val Worrell	W81	Australia	16.59 m (54 ft 5 in)
3rd place, bronze medalist(s)	Mary B. Roman	W81	United States	13.00 m (42 ft 7 in)

==== W90 Discus Throw ====
Pos	Athlete	Age	Country	Result
1st place, gold medalist(s)	Shirley Dietderich	W90	United States	9.23 m (30 ft 3 in)

=== Hammer Throw ===
==== W35 Hammer throw ====
Pos	Athlete	Age	Country	Result
1st place, gold medalist(s)	Byrony Glass	W39	Australia	50.95 m (167 ft 1 in)
2nd place, silver medalist(s)	Johanna Leivonen	W39	Finland	37.54 m (123 ft 1 in)
3rd place, bronze medalist(s)	Audrey Thomson	W37	Australia	31.69 m (103 ft 11 in)

==== W40 Hammer throw ====
Pos	Athlete	Age	Country	Result
1st place, gold medalist(s)	Kirsi Koro	W40	Finland	50.60 m (166 ft 0 in)
2nd place, silver medalist(s)	Andrea Jenkins	W41	Great Britain	47.98 m (157 ft 4 in)
3rd place, bronze medalist(s)	Bettina Schardt	W44	Germany	43.57 m (142 ft 11 in)

==== W45 Hammer throw ====
Pos	Athlete	Age	Country	Result
1st place, gold medalist(s)	Sue Lawrence	W45	Great Britain	39.04 m (128 ft 1 in)
2nd place, silver medalist(s)	Mireill Tonizzo-Kosmala	W48	Luxembourg	37.80 m (124 ft 0 in)
3rd place, bronze medalist(s)	Kathleen De Wolf	W49	Belgium	37.14 m (121 ft 10 in)

==== W50 Hammer throw ====
Pos	Athlete	Age	Country	Result
1st place, gold medalist(s)	Claudine Cacaut	W51	France	51.28 m (168 ft 2 in)
2nd place, silver medalist(s)	Connie Hodel	W53	Switzerland	48.93 m (160 ft 6 in)
3rd place, bronze medalist(s)	Jayne Hardy	W53	Australia	46.17 m (151 ft 5 in)

==== W55 Hammer throw ====
Pos	Athlete	Age	Country	Result
1st place, gold medalist(s)	Mägy Duss	W57	Switzerland	42.19 m (138 ft 5 in)
2nd place, silver medalist(s)	Sharon Gibbins	W58	Australia	37.80 m (124 ft 0 in)
3rd place, bronze medalist(s)	Carol Finsrud	W59	United States	37.74 m (123 ft 9 in)

==== W60 Hammer throw ====
Pos	Athlete	Age	Country	Result
1st place, gold medalist(s)	Dorn Jenkins	W61	Australia	42.18 m (138 ft 4 in)
2nd place, silver medalist(s)	Anne Jensen Kirstine	W62	Denmark	36.81 m (120 ft 9 in)
3rd place, bronze medalist(s)	June Lowe	W62	Australia	34.72 m (113 ft 10 in)

==== W65 Hammer throw ====
Pos	Athlete	Age	Country	Result
1st place, gold medalist(s)	Eva Nohl	W67	Germany	38.49 m (126 ft 3 in)
2nd place, silver medalist(s)	Inge Faldager	W68	Denmark	35.80 m (117 ft 5 in)
3rd place, bronze medalist(s)	Margarethe Tomanek	W67	Belgium	34.57 m (113 ft 5 in)

==== W70 Hammer throw ====
Pos	Athlete	Age	Country	Result
1st place, gold medalist(s)	Mary Thomas	W72	Australia	27.96 m (91 ft 8 in)
2nd place, silver medalist(s)	Kirsti Viitanen	W74	Finland	26.17 m (85 ft 10 in)
3rd place, bronze medalist(s)	Beverley Hamilton	W70	Australia	25.64 m (84 ft 1 in)

==== W75 Hammer throw ====
Pos	Athlete	Age	Country	Result
1st place, gold medalist(s)	Janice Banens	W75	Australia	34.25 m (112 ft 4 in)
2nd place, silver medalist(s)	Tomoko Kanari	W75	Japan	27.80 m (91 ft 2 in)
3rd place, bronze medalist(s)	Glen Watts	W76	New Zealand	27.22 m (89 ft 3 in)

==== W80 Hammer throw ====
Pos	Athlete	Age	Country	Result
1st place, gold medalist(s)	Val Worrell	W81	Australia	23.90 m (78 ft 4 in)
2nd place, silver medalist(s)	Anne Martin	W80	Great Britain	23.22 m (76 ft 2 in)
3rd place, bronze medalist(s)	Heather Doherty	W83	Australia	20.10 m (65 ft 11 in)

==== W85 Hammer throw ====
Pos	Athlete	Age	Country	Result
1st place, gold medalist(s)	Clasina Van der Veeken	W85	New Zealand	17.29 m (56 ft 8 in)
2nd place, silver medalist(s)	Marcia Petley	W87	New Zealand	16.50 m (54 ft 1 in)

=== Javelin Throw ===
==== W35 Javelin Throw ====
Pos	Athlete	Age	Country	Result
1st place, gold medalist(s)	Jindriska Noasova	W38	Czech Republic	37.30 m (122 ft 4 in)
2nd place, silver medalist(s)	Margreet Takken	W37	Netherlands	36.91 m (121 ft 1 in)
3rd place, bronze medalist(s)	Kate Adams	W37	Australia	35.09 m (115 ft 1 in)

==== W40 Javelin Throw ====
Pos	Athlete	Age	Country	Result
1st place, gold medalist(s)	Marsha Baird	W42	Trinidad and Tobago	40.13 m (131 ft 7 in)
2nd place, silver medalist(s)	Geraldine George	W44	Trinidad and Tobago	39.33 m (129 ft 0 in)
3rd place, bronze medalist(s)	Anne Hojka	W40	Belgium	39.18 m (128 ft 6 in)

==== W45 Javelin Throw ====
Pos	Athlete	Age	Country	Result
1st place, gold medalist(s)	Kim Ethier	W48	Canada	36.90 m (121 ft 0 in)
2nd place, silver medalist(s)	Ina Adam	W48	Germany	36.83 m (120 ft 10 in)
3rd place, bronze medalist(s)	Shalini Shetty Rajesh	W45	India	32.32 m (106 ft 0 in)

==== W50 Javelin Throw ====
Pos	Athlete	Age	Country	Result
1st place, gold medalist(s)	Sueli Dashwood	W51	Australia	38.12 m (125 ft 0 in)
2nd place, silver medalist(s)	Jayne Hardy	W53	Australia	35.25 m (115 ft 7 in)
3rd place, bronze medalist(s)	Ilona Kojalovica	W50	Latvia	33.78 m (110 ft 9 in)

==== W55 Javelin Throw ====
Pos	Athlete	Age	Country	Result
1st place, gold medalist(s)	Heli Herlevi-Malila	W55	Finland	35.40 m (116 ft 1 in)
2nd place, silver medalist(s)	Marie Kay	W56	Australia	30.36 m (99 ft 7 in)
3rd place, bronze medalist(s)	Tamara Alegria-Dybvig	W57	United States	29.42 m (96 ft 6 in)

==== W60 Javelin Throw ====
Pos	Athlete	Age	Country	Result
1st place, gold medalist(s)	Anne Jensen Kirstine	W62	Denmark	30.59 m (100 ft 4 in)
2nd place, silver medalist(s)	Erlinda Lavandia	W64	Philippines	30.42 m (99 ft 9 in)
3rd place, bronze medalist(s)	Ana Martinho	W61	Portugal	25.89 m (84 ft 11 in)

==== W65 Javelin Throw ====
Pos	Athlete	Age	Country	Result
1st place, gold medalist(s)	Jarmila Klimešová	W68	Czech Republic	28.76 m (94 ft 4 in)
2nd place, silver medalist(s)	Eva Nohl	W67	Germany	22.37 m (73 ft 4 in)
3rd place, bronze medalist(s)	Gisèle Geneviève	W66	France	22.16 m (72 ft 8 in)

==== W70 Javelin Throw ====
Pos	Athlete	Age	Country	Result
1st place, gold medalist(s)	Kirsti Viitanen	W74	Finland	23.91 m (78 ft 5 in)
2nd place, silver medalist(s)	Mary Thomas	W72	Australia	23.63 m (77 ft 6 in)
3rd place, bronze medalist(s)	Helina Pihlaja	W72	Finland	17.41 m (57 ft 1 in)

==== W75 Javelin Throw ====
Pos	Athlete	Age	Country	Result
1st place, gold medalist(s)	Miriam Cudmore	W78	Australia	20.65 m (67 ft 8 in)
2nd place, silver medalist(s)	Tserendolgor Tumurbat	W78	Mongolia	19.84 m (65 ft 1 in)
3rd place, bronze medalist(s)	Tomoko Kanari	W75	Japan	17.28 m (56 ft 8 in)

==== W80 Javelin Throw ====
Pos	Athlete	Age	Country	Result
1st place, gold medalist(s)	Heather Doherty	W83	Australia	14.04 m (46 ft 0 in)
2nd place, silver medalist(s)	Christel Donley	W81	United States	13.30 m (43 ft 7 in)
3rd place, bronze medalist(s)	Mary Roman B.	W81	United States	9.90 m (32 ft 5 in)

==== W90 Javelin Throw ====
Pos	Athlete	Age	Country	Result
1st place, gold medalist(s)	Shirley Dietderich	W90	United States	6.03 m (19 ft 9 in)

=== Weight Throw ===
==== W35 Weight Throw ====
Pos	Athlete	Age	Country	Result
1st place, gold medalist(s)	Byrony Glass	W39	Australia	16.28 m (53 ft 4 3/4 in)
2nd place, silver medalist(s)	Johanna Leivonen	W39	Finland	13.25 m (43 ft 5 1/2 in)
3rd place, bronze medalist(s)	Sally Sims	W38	Australia	10.90 m (35 ft 9 in)

==== W40 Weight Throw ====
Pos	Athlete	Age	Country	Result
1st place, gold medalist(s)	Kirsi Koro	W40	Finland	15.50 m (50 ft 10 in)
2nd place, silver medalist(s)	Andrea Jenkins	W41	Great Britain	15.11 m (49 ft 6 3/4 in)
3rd place, bronze medalist(s)	Elizabeth Teague	W42	United States	14.18 m (46 ft 6 1/4 in)

==== W45 Weight Throw ====
Pos	Athlete	Age	Country	Result
1st place, gold medalist(s)	Mireill Tonizzo-Kosmala	W48	Luxembourg	13.21 m (43 ft 4 in)
2nd place, silver medalist(s)	Sue Lawrence	W45	Great Britain	11.84 m (38 ft 10 in)
3rd place, bronze medalist(s)	Wolf De Kathleen	W49	Belgium	11.81 m (38 ft 8 3/4 in)

==== W50 Weight Throw ====
Pos	Athlete	Age	Country	Result
1st place, gold medalist(s)	Claudine Cacaut	W51	France	15.12 m (49 ft 7 1/4 in)
2nd place, silver medalist(s)	Connie Hodel	W53	Switzerland	14.34 m (47 ft 1/2 in)
3rd place, bronze medalist(s)	Dijk van Ingrid	W54	Netherlands	14.02 m (45 ft 11 3/4 in)

==== W55 Weight Throw ====
Pos	Athlete	Age	Country	Result
1st place, gold medalist(s)	Mägy Duss	W57	Switzerland	14.45 m (47 ft 4 3/4 in)
2nd place, silver medalist(s)	Carol Finsrud	W59	United States	13.77 m (45 ft 2 in)
3rd place, bronze medalist(s)	Lea Vahter	W55	Estonia	13.33 m (43 ft 8 3/4 in)

==== W60 Weight Throw ====
Pos	Athlete	Age	Country	Result
1st place, gold medalist(s)	Dorn Jenkins	W61	Australia	16.57 m (54 ft 4 1/4 in)
2nd place, silver medalist(s)	Siv Karlstrom	W60	Finland	15.21 m (49 ft 10 3/4 in)
3rd place, bronze medalist(s)	Anne Jensen Kirstine	W62	Denmark	13.43 m (44 ft 1/2 in)

==== W65 Weight Throw ====
Pos	Athlete	Age	Country	Result
1st place, gold medalist(s)	Inge Faldager	W68	Denmark	15.15 m (49 ft 8 1/4 in)
2nd place, silver medalist(s)	Eva Nohl	W67	Germany	15.07 m (49 ft 5 1/4 in)
3rd place, bronze medalist(s)	Margarethe Tomanek	W67	Belgium	14.33 m (47 ft 0 in)

==== W70 Weight Throw ====
Pos	Athlete	Age	Country	Result
1st place, gold medalist(s)	Kirsti Viitanen	W74	Finland	11.96 m (39 ft 2 3/4 in)
2nd place, silver medalist(s)	Mary Thomas	W72	Australia	11.44 m (37 ft 6 1/4 in)
3rd place, bronze medalist(s)	Beverley Hamilton	W70	Australia	10.84 m (35 ft 6 3/4 in)

==== W75 Weight Throw ====
Pos	Athlete	Age	Country	Result
1st place, gold medalist(s)	Janice Banens	W75	Australia	13.48 m (44 ft 2 1/2 in)
2nd place, silver medalist(s)	Tomoko Kanari	W75	Japan	10.73 m (35 ft 2 1/4 in)
3rd place, bronze medalist(s)	Tserendolgor Tumurbat	W78	Mongolia	10.22 m (33 ft 6 1/4 in)

==== W80 Weight Throw ====
Pos	Athlete	Age	Country	Result
1st place, gold medalist(s)	Mary B. Roman	W81	United States	9.92 m (32 ft 6 1/2 in)
2nd place, silver medalist(s)	Val Worrell	W81	Australia	8.49 m (27 ft 10 1/4 in)
3rd place, bronze medalist(s)	Heather Doherty	W83	Australia	8.21 m (26 ft 11 in)

=== Heptathlon ===
==== W35 Heptathlon ====
Pos	Athlete	Age	Country	Result
1st place, gold medalist(s)	Gunild Kreb	W35	Germany	4664
2nd place, silver medalist(s)	Linda Holmstrom	W37	Sweden	4211
3rd place, bronze medalist(s)	Aanika Milne	W35	Australia	4099

==== W40 Heptathlon ====
Pos	Athlete	Age	Country	Result
1st place, gold medalist(s)	Marsha Baird	W42	Trinidad and Tobago	5390
2nd place, silver medalist(s)	Rachel Guest	W41	United States	5180
3rd place, bronze medalist(s)	Primrose Ulegård	W40	Sweden	3962

==== W45 Heptathlon ====
Pos	Athlete	Age	Country	Result
1st place, gold medalist(s)	Lenorë Lambert	W46	Australia	5244
2nd place, silver medalist(s)	Karen Carah	W48	Australia	4673
3rd place, bronze medalist(s)	Mojca Breganski	W47	Slovenia	4549

==== W50 Heptathlon ====
Pos	Athlete	Age	Country	Result
1st place, gold medalist(s)	Kirsti Siekkinen	W50	Finland	5654
2nd place, silver medalist(s)	Geraldine Finegan	W51	Ireland	5441
3rd place, bronze medalist(s)	Gerda Andries	W51	Belgium	4669

==== W55 Heptathlon ====
Pos	Athlete	Age	Country	Result
1st place, gold medalist(s)	Marie Kay	W56	Australia	5717
2nd place, silver medalist(s)	Machiko Yamazaki	W56	Japan	5356
3rd place, bronze medalist(s)	de van Kamp Linneban Br	W56	Netherlands	4779

==== W60 Heptathlon ====
Pos	Athlete	Age	Country	Result
1st place, gold medalist(s)	Carole Filer	W60	Great Britain	5648
2nd place, silver medalist(s)	Ruth Pach	W63	Germany	4671
3rd place, bronze medalist(s)	Colette Ruineau	W63	France	2530

==== W65 Heptathlon ====
Pos	Athlete	Age	Country	Result
1st place, gold medalist(s)	Wilma Perkins	W67	Australia	5592
2nd place, silver medalist(s)	Stephanie Claassen	W65	South Africa	4826
3rd place, bronze medalist(s)	Terhi Kokkonen	W69	Finland	4727

==== W70 Heptathlon ====
Pos	Athlete	Age	Country	Result
1st place, gold medalist(s)	Marianne Maier	W73	Austria	6195
2nd place, silver medalist(s)	Fuen Teng	W70	China	4699
3rd place, bronze medalist(s)	Lois Anderson	W70	New Zealand	4504

==== W75 Heptathlon ====
Pos	Athlete	Age	Country	Result
1st place, gold medalist(s)	Frances Harris	W75	Australia	4215
2nd place, silver medalist(s)	Seija Sario	W75	Finland	3682
3rd place, bronze medalist(s)	Varpu Holmberg	W75	Finland	2560

==== W80 Heptathlon ====
Pos	Athlete	Age	Country	Result
1st place, gold medalist(s)	Irene Obera	W82	United States	6071 WR
2nd place, silver medalist(s)	Christel Donley	W81	United States	5136
3rd place, bronze medalist(s)	Hiroko Mabuchi	W80	Japan	3981

=== Throws Pentathlon ===
==== W35 Throws Pentathlon ====
Pos	Athlete	Age	Country	Result
1st place, gold medalist(s)	Byrony Glass	W39	Australia	3436
2nd place, silver medalist(s)	Johanna Leivonen	W39	Finland	3164
3rd place, bronze medalist(s)	Jindriska Noasova	W38	Czech Republic	2806

==== W40 Throws Pentathlon ====
Pos	Athlete	Age	Country	Result
1st place, gold medalist(s)	Andrea Jenkins	W41	Great Britain	3704
2nd place, silver medalist(s)	Kirsi Koro	W40	Finland	3596
3rd place, bronze medalist(s)	Bettina Schardt	W44	Germany	3511

==== W45 Throws Pentathlon ====
Pos	Athlete	Age	Country	Result
1st place, gold medalist(s)	Sue Lawrence	W45	Great Britain	3301
2nd place, silver medalist(s)	Kimberly Lindner	W45	United States	3265
3rd place, bronze medalist(s)	Brenda Davis	W47	New Zealand	3246

==== W50 Throws Pentathlon ====
Pos	Athlete	Age	Country	Result
1st place, gold medalist(s)	Connie Hodel	W53	Switzerland	4070
2nd place, silver medalist(s)	Raylene Bates	W50	New Zealand	4021
3rd place, bronze medalist(s)	Jayne Hardy	W53	Australia	3892

==== W55 Throws Pentathlon ====
Pos	Athlete	Age	Country	Result
1st place, gold medalist(s)	Lea Vahter	W55	Estonia	4178
2nd place, silver medalist(s)	Carol Finsrud	W59	United States	4100
3rd place, bronze medalist(s)	Mägy Duss	W57	Switzerland	3614

==== W60 Throws Pentathlon ====
Pos	Athlete	Age	Country	Result
1st place, gold medalist(s)	Anne Jensen Kirstine	W62	Denmark	4449
2nd place, silver medalist(s)	June Lowe	W62	Australia	3757
3rd place, bronze medalist(s)	Elisa Yli-Hallila	W63	Finland	3744

==== W65 Throws Pentathlon ====
Pos	Athlete	Age	Country	Result
1st place, gold medalist(s)	Inge Faldager	W68	Denmark	4303
2nd place, silver medalist(s)	Eva Nohl	W67	Germany	4186
3rd place, bronze medalist(s)	Jarmila Klimešová	W68	Czech Republic	3625

==== W70 Throws Pentathlon ====
Pos	Athlete	Age	Country	Result
1st place, gold medalist(s)	Mary Thomas	W72	Australia	4079
2nd place, silver medalist(s)	Kirsti Viitanen	W74	Finland	3991
3rd place, bronze medalist(s)	Beverley Hamilton	W70	Australia	3822

==== W75 Throws Pentathlon ====
Pos	Athlete	Age	Country	Result
1st place, gold medalist(s)	Tomoko Kanari	W75	Japan	4380
2nd place, silver medalist(s)	Janice Banens	W75	Australia	4182
3rd place, bronze medalist(s)	Tserendolgor Tumurbat	W78	Mongolia	4129

==== W80 Throws Pentathlon ====
Pos	Athlete	Age	Country	Result
1st place, gold medalist(s)	Val Worrell	W81	Australia	3407
2nd place, silver medalist(s)	Mary Roman B.	W81	United States	3370
3rd place, bronze medalist(s)	Heather Doherty	W83	Australia	3364

=== 5000 metres Racewalk ===
==== W35 5000 metres Racewalk ====
Pos	Athlete	Age	Country	Result
1st place, gold medalist(s)	Tatiana Zucconi	W39	Italy	25:48.27
2nd place, silver medalist(s)	Sandrine Eichholtzer	W39	France	26:39.22
3rd place, bronze medalist(s)	Sandra Geisler	W38	Australia	27:33.77

==== W40 5000 metres Racewalk ====
Pos	Athlete	Age	Country	Result
1st place, gold medalist(s)	Kelly Ruddick	W43	Australia	24:49.61
2nd place, silver medalist(s)	Cheryl Webb	W40	Australia	25:57.36
3rd place, bronze medalist(s)	Susan Randall	W42	United States	26:23.67

==== W45 5000 metres Racewalk ====
Pos	Athlete	Age	Country	Result
1st place, gold medalist(s)	Michelle Laufer	W46	Australia	26:20.18
2nd place, silver medalist(s)	Wendy Muldoon	W45	Australia	28:23.39
3rd place, bronze medalist(s)	Diana Adams	W48	New Zealand	29:11.99

==== W50 5000 metres Racewalk ====
Pos	Athlete	Age	Country	Result
1st place, gold medalist(s)	Souza Bagur Es	W51	Brazil	28:39.67
2nd place, silver medalist(s)	Ann Staunton-Jugovic	W52	Australia	28:43.67
3rd place, bronze medalist(s)	Manuela Lucaferro	W52	Italy	29:32.24

==== W55 5000 metres Racewalk ====
Pos	Athlete	Age	Country	Result
1st place, gold medalist(s)	Pam Tindal	W56	Australia	27:15.69
2nd place, silver medalist(s)	Peppina Demartis	W56	Italy	27:27.40
3rd place, bronze medalist(s)	Frontons Garcia Carmen	W55	Spain	28:45.93

==== W60 5000 metres Racewalk ====
Pos	Athlete	Age	Country	Result
1st place, gold medalist(s)	Barbara Nell	W62	South Africa	27:32.00
2nd place, silver medalist(s)	Lynette Ventris	W60	Australia	27:51.27
3rd place, bronze medalist(s)	Barb Bryant	W62	Australia	28:53.58

==== W65 5000 metres Racewalk ====
Pos	Athlete	Age	Country	Result
1st place, gold medalist(s)	Heather Carr	W67	Australia	29:03.99
2nd place, silver medalist(s)	Maria Mendes Orlete	W65	Portugal	30:12.24
3rd place, bronze medalist(s)	Marianne Martino	W66	United States	30:48.28

==== W70 5000 metres Racewalk ====
Pos	Athlete	Age	Country	Result
1st place, gold medalist(s)	Elsa Meyer	W70	South Africa	30:33.72
2nd place, silver medalist(s)	Jacqueline Wilson	W70	New Zealand	31:43.15
3rd place, bronze medalist(s)	Kathleen Frable	W71	United States	33:39.14

==== W75 5000 metres Racewalk ====
Pos	Athlete	Age	Country	Result
1st place, gold medalist(s)	Hildegard Vey	W75	South Africa	35:41.31
2nd place, silver medalist(s)	Sylvia Machin	W75	Australia	35:41.66
3rd place, bronze medalist(s)	Daphne Jones	W75	New Zealand	35:43.23

==== W80 5000 metres Racewalk ====
Pos	Athlete	Age	Country	Result
1st place, gold medalist(s)	Jean Horne	W84	Canada	40:07.62
2nd place, silver medalist(s)	Sylvia Byers	W81	Australia	44:09.81

==== W85 5000 metres Racewalk ====
Pos	Athlete	Age	Country	Result
1st place, gold medalist(s)	Christiane Dauphinet	W85	Australia	41:20.34R
2nd place, silver medalist(s)	Heather Lee	W89	Australia	42:48.12

==== W90 5000 metres Racewalk ====
Pos	Athlete	Age	Country	Result
1st place, gold medalist(s)	Elena Pagu	W90	Romania	44:28.33R

=== 10,000 metres race walk ===
==== W35 10,000 metres race walk ====
Pos	Athlete	Age	Country	Result
1st place, gold medalist(s)	Tatiana Zucconi	W39	Italy	53:04
2nd place, silver medalist(s)	Sandrine Eichholtzer	W39	France	55:33
3rd place, bronze medalist(s)	Sandra Geisler	W38	Australia	57:44

==== W40 10,000 metres race walk ====
Pos	Athlete	Age	Country	Result
1st place, gold medalist(s)	Cheryl Webb	W40	Australia	53:30
2nd place, silver medalist(s)	Susan Randall	W42	United States	53:52
3rd place, bronze medalist(s)	Lenka Borovickova	W43	Czech Republic	58:56

==== W45 10,000 metres race walk ====
Pos	Athlete	Age	Country	Result
1st place, gold medalist(s)	Michelle Laufer	W46	Australia	54:06
2nd place, silver medalist(s)	Wendy Muldoon	W45	Australia	58:01
3rd place, bronze medalist(s)	Nyle Sunderland	W49	New Zealand	58:10

==== W50 10,000 metres race walk ====
Pos	Athlete	Age	Country	Result
1st place, gold medalist(s)	de Rocha Souza Bagur Es	W51	Brazil	59:27
2nd place, silver medalist(s)	Ann Staunton-Jugovic	W52	Australia	1:00:42
2nd place, silver medalist(s)	Karyn Tolardo	W51	Australia	1:00:42

==== W55 10,000 metres race walk ====
Pos	Athlete	Age	Country	Result
1st place, gold medalist(s)	Peppina Demartis	W56	Italy	56:58
2nd place, silver medalist(s)	Pam Tindal	W56	Australia	57:57
3rd place, bronze medalist(s)	Daniela Ricciutelli	W59	Italy	1:00:23

==== W60 10,000 metres race walk ====
Pos	Athlete	Age	Country	Result
1st place, gold medalist(s)	Barbara Nell	W62	South Africa	57:54
2nd place, silver medalist(s)	Barb Bryant	W62	Australia	59:30
3rd place, bronze medalist(s)	Cath Duhig	W62	Great Britain	1:01:52

==== W65 10,000 metres race walk ====
Pos	Athlete	Age	Country	Result
1st place, gold medalist(s)	Heather Carr	W67	Australia	59:38
2nd place, silver medalist(s)	Maria Mendes Orlete	W65	Portugal	1:02:03
3rd place, bronze medalist(s)	Marianne Martino	W66	United States	1:02:37

==== W70 10,000 metres race walk ====
Pos	Athlete	Age	Country	Result
1st place, gold medalist(s)	Elsa Meyer	W70	South Africa	1:02:22
2nd place, silver medalist(s)	Jacqueline Wilson	W70	New Zealand	1:04:37
3rd place, bronze medalist(s)	Kathleen Frable	W71	United States	1:09:08

==== W75 10,000 metres race walk ====
Pos	Athlete	Age	Country	Result
1st place, gold medalist(s)	Hildegard Vey	W75	South Africa	1:12:10
2nd place, silver medalist(s)	Sylvia Machin	W75	Australia	1:12:54
3rd place, bronze medalist(s)	Daphne Jones	W75	New Zealand	1:13:30

==== W80 10,000 metres race walk ====
Pos	Athlete	Age	Country	Result
1st place, gold medalist(s)	Jean Horne	W84	Canada	1:20:06
2nd place, silver medalist(s)	Sylvia Byers	W81	Australia	1:30:38

==== W85 10,000 metres race walk ====
Pos	Athlete	Age	Country	Result
1st place, gold medalist(s)	Heather Lee	W89	Australia	1:27:02

==== W90 10,000 metres race walk ====
Pos	Athlete	Age	Country	Result
1st place, gold medalist(s)	Elena Pagu	W90	Romania	1:31:21R

=== 20,000 metres race walk ===
==== W35 20,000 metres race walk ====
Pos	Athlete	Age	Country	Result
1st place, gold medalist(s)	Tatiana Zucconi	W39	Italy	1:49:36
2nd place, silver medalist(s)	Sandrine Eichholtzer	W39	France	1:57:08
3rd place, bronze medalist(s)	Sandra Geisler	W38	Australia	2:01:09

==== W40 20,000 metres race walk ====
Pos	Athlete	Age	Country	Result
1st place, gold medalist(s)	Susan Randall	W42	United States	1:51:40
2nd place, silver medalist(s)	Lenka Borovickova	W43	Czech Republic	1:59:11
3rd place, bronze medalist(s)	Luevano Lupercio Ma. De	W43	Mexico	2:05:35

==== W45 20,000 metres race walk ====
Pos	Athlete	Age	Country	Result
1st place, gold medalist(s)	Michelle Laufer	W46	Australia	1:55:38
2nd place, silver medalist(s)	Nyle Sunderland	W49	New Zealand	1:59:44
3rd place, bronze medalist(s)	Aija Rogale	W47	Latvia	2:11:56

==== W50 20,000 metres race walk ====
Pos	Athlete	Age	Country	Result
1st place, gold medalist(s)	de Rocha Souza Bagur Es	W51	Brazil	2:01:54
2nd place, silver medalist(s)	Karyn Tolardo	W51	Australia	2:07:03
3rd place, bronze medalist(s)	Manuela Lucaferro	W52	Italy	2:07:56

==== W55 20,000 metres race walk ====
Pos	Athlete	Age	Country	Result
1st place, gold medalist(s)	Daniela Ricciutelli; Peppina Demartis	W59	Italy	2:04:46
3rd place, bronze medalist(s)	Pam Tindal	W56	Australia	2:05:58

==== W60 20,000 metres race walk ====
Pos	Athlete	Age	Country	Result
1st place, gold medalist(s)	Barb Bryant	W62	Australia	2:05:22
2nd place, silver medalist(s)	Barbara Nell	W62	South Africa	2:06:29
3rd place, bronze medalist(s)	Cath Duhig	W62	Great Britain	2:10:10

==== W65 20,000 metres race walk ====
Pos	Athlete	Age	Country	Result
1st place, gold medalist(s)	Heather Carr	W67	Australia	2:06:45
2nd place, silver medalist(s)	Marianne Martino	W66	United States	2:10:50
3rd place, bronze medalist(s)	Maria Mendes Orlete	W65	Portugal	2:12:09

==== W70 20,000 metres race walk ====
Pos	Athlete	Age	Country	Result
1st place, gold medalist(s)	Elsa Meyer	W70	South Africa	2:10:58R
2nd place, silver medalist(s)	Jacqueline Wilson	W70	New Zealand	2:17:02
3rd place, bronze medalist(s)	Kathleen Frable	W71	United States	2:27:46

==== W75 20,000 metres race walk ====
Pos	Athlete	Age	Country	Result
1st place, gold medalist(s)	Hildegard Vey	W75	South Africa	2:33:39R
2nd place, silver medalist(s)	Helga Dräger	W77	Germany	2:49:53
3rd place, bronze medalist(s)	Lynne Schickert	W75	Australia	2:52:27

== See also ==
- 2016 World Masters Athletics Championships Men
