= Miguel Tudela =

Miguel Tudela may refer to:

- Miguel Tudela (judoka), American judoka
- Miguel Tudela (surfer) (born 1994), Peruvian surfer
