= Dedeh Erawati =

Indonesian sprint hurdler

Personal information
- Nationality: Indonesia
- Born: 25 May 1979 (age 47) Sumedang, West Java, Indonesia
- Height: 1.67 m (5 ft 6 in)
- Weight: 58 kg (128 lb)

Sport
- Sport: Athletics
- Event: 100 metres hurdles
- Coached by: Fahmy Fachrezzy

Achievements and titles
- Olympic finals: Beijing 2008
- Personal best: 13.18"
Medal record
Women's athletics
Representing Indonesia
World Masters Games
| Gold medal – first place | 2017 Auckland | W35 200 m |
| Bronze medal – third place | 2017 Auckland | W35 100 m |
World Masters Championships
| Gold medal – first place | 2016 Perth | W35 100 m |
| Gold medal – first place | 2016 Perth | W35 100 m hurdles |
| Gold medal – first place | 2018 Malaga | W35 100 m hurdles |
| Silver medal – second place | 2016 Perth | W35 200 m |
| Silver medal – second place | 2018 Malaga | W35 100 m |
Asian Championships
| Bronze medal – third place | 2009 Guangzhou | 100 m hurdles |
Asian Indoor Championships
| Bronze medal – third place | 2006 Pattaya | 60 m hurdles |
Asia Masters Championships
| Gold medal – first place | 2017 Rugao | 200 m W35 |
| Gold medal – first place | 2017 Rugao | 100 m hurdles W35 |
| Gold medal – first place | 2023 New Clark City | 80 m hurdles 40+ |
Islamic Solidarity Games
| Gold medal – first place | 2013 Palembang | 100 m hurdles |
SEA Games
| Gold medal – first place | 2007 Nakhon Ratchasima | 100 m hurdles |
| Gold medal – first place | 2009 Vientiane | 100 m hurdles |
| Gold medal – first place | 2013 Naypyidaw | 100 m hurdles |
| Silver medal – second place | 2005 Manila | 100 m hurdles |
| Silver medal – second place | 2011 Jakarta–Palembang | 100 m hurdles |
| Silver medal – second place | 2011 Jakarta–Palembang | 4×100 m relay |
| Silver medal – second place | 2015 Singapore | 100 m hurdles |

Dedeh Erawati (born 25 May 1979 in Sumedang) is an Indonesian sprint hurdler. She is a four-time medalist and two-time defending champion at the SEA Games. She won the bronze medal at the 2009 Asian Athletics Championships in Guangzhou, China, with a time of 13.32 seconds, finishing behind Japan's Asuka Terada and China's Sun Yawei, who claimed the gold in the hurdles. She also set both her personal best and national record of 13.18 seconds at the 2012 Taiwan Open in Taipei, Taiwan.

== Career ==
Erawati represented Indonesia at the 2008 Summer Olympics in Beijing, where she competed for the women's 100 m hurdles. She ran in the fifth and final heat against seven other athletes, including Jamaica's Brigitte Foster-Hylton, and Dawn Harper of the United States, who later dominated this event by winning an Olympic gold medal. She finished the heat in seventh place by twenty-four hundredths of a second (0.24) behind Haiti's Nadine Faustin, with a slowest possible time of 13.49 seconds. Erawati, however, failed to advance into the semi-finals, as she placed thirty-fourth overall, and ranked below two mandatory slots for the next round.

Due to her achievements while representing Jakarta at the National Sports Week events, she was appointed as a civil servant at the provincial government.

== Other Achievements ==
| Year | Competition | Venue | Position | Event | Notes |
Representing Indonesia
| 2010 | Oceania Championships | Cairns, Australia | 2nd (guest) | 100 m hurdles | 13.84 s (wind: -0.4 m/s) |
