= Miguel Tudela (judoka) =

American judoka

Miguel Tudela is a former judoka for the 1980 United States Olympics team but he did not compete due to the 1980 Summer Olympics boycott.

Tudela served in the United States Army from 1974 to 1976, and won a military title in 1976.

He is a three time U.S. National Champion, winning in 1979, 1980 and 1983, and also finished second once. He won a bronze medal at the 1979 Pan American Games in San Juan, Puerto Rico. In his prime Tudela was considered "the dominant American light-heavyweight". He and his wife were featured in an article in the Los Angeles Times about their lives and his attempt to make the 1984 U.S. Olympic team, but that dream ended when he was forced to withdraw in the fourth round of the U.S. Olympic Trials with an injury.

He is married to three time national Judo champion Diane Pierce Tudela.
