= Diane Pierce Tudela =

Judoka

Diane Pierce Tudela is a former 3 time US National Champion in Judo. She has been considered a top 10 female competitor in Judo regardless of weight class. She competed and earned Gold Medals in the 1974, 1975, and 1977 US National Championships. She earned a bronze in the US National Championships 1978 as well. She married fellow Judoka Miguel Tudela. She was well known for her Arm Bar. She currently serves as a coach in the US Judo Training Center.

== Personal life ==
Diane is from Minnesota. Diane attended Los Angeles Community College. She is married to Olympian Miguel Tudela
