= Zohra Graziani-Koullou =

French middle-distance runner

Personal information
- Nationality: French
- Born: 7 January 1966 (age 59)

Sport
- Sport: Middle-distance running
- Event: 3000 metres

Zohra Graziani-Koullou (born 7 January 1966) is a French middle-distance runner. She competed in the women's 3000 metres at the 1992 Summer Olympics.
