= Jeanne Daprano =

American athlete (1936–2021)

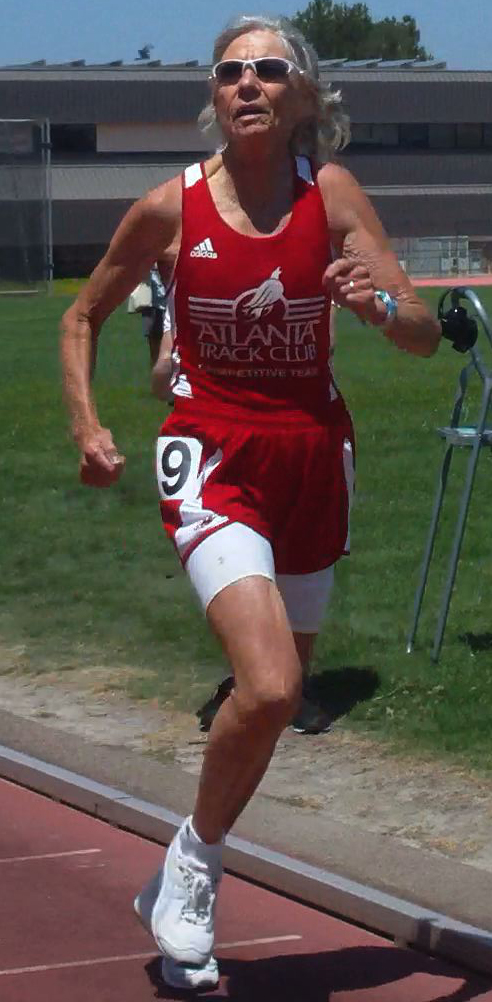
Jeanne Daprano finishing her W75 Mile run at Caltech in Pasadena, California

Jeanne Daprano (September 16, 1936 – December 1, 2021) was an American elementary school teacher and world record setting American masters track and field athlete.

== Biography ==
On July 21, 2012, Daprano became the first woman over 75 to run under seven minutes in the mile run, with a time of 6:58.44. She also holds the records for the mile run for 70-year-olds and 80-year-olds. In order to compare times across multiple age groups, masters athletics has established age graded tables based on previous results. Daprano's mile is so far beyond the scale that the time converts to a 4:00.23. The current world record for the women's mile is 4:12.56 set by Svetlana Masterkova in 1996 and Masterkova's mark is so exceptional, no other woman has been within five seconds of that mark since.

While she had always been active on her Iowa farm or playing basketball in high school and college in Nebraska, she did not take up running until she started jogging on the beach while working on her master's degree in California. She spent the majority of her career just keeping active with her third grade class in Long Beach, California and did not get into a serious jogging routine until she was 45. She finally got serious about running competitively after turning 60. Since then she has set records in each age division she has passed through. Daprano lived in Atlanta, Georgia for 22 years before her death and ran for the Atlanta Track Club.

Daprano holds the current world records in the W70 mile, W75 400 metres, 800 metres, in addition to the pending W75 mile record. Indoors she hold the W75 records in those same events and is on the W60 4 × 400 metres relay. She also holds the American records in the W70 400 metres, W65 and W70 800 metres, and W70 1500 metres. And the W75 mile improves the record by so much, it is also superior to the W75 American record in the 1500, a race that is 109.35 metres shorter. Daprano's late husband, Bill, about ten years her senior was also an active masters athlete and was part of two American record holding relay teams. They were married 22 years before his death in 2021. Just 17 days after Bill's death, Jeanne died from Parkinson's disease on December 1, 2021, at the age of 85.
