= 1991 World Masters Athletics Championships =

Coordinates: 60.4425508°N 22.2587239°E

- Dates: 18 - 28 July 1991
- Host city: Turku, Finland
- Venue: Paavo Nurmi Stadium
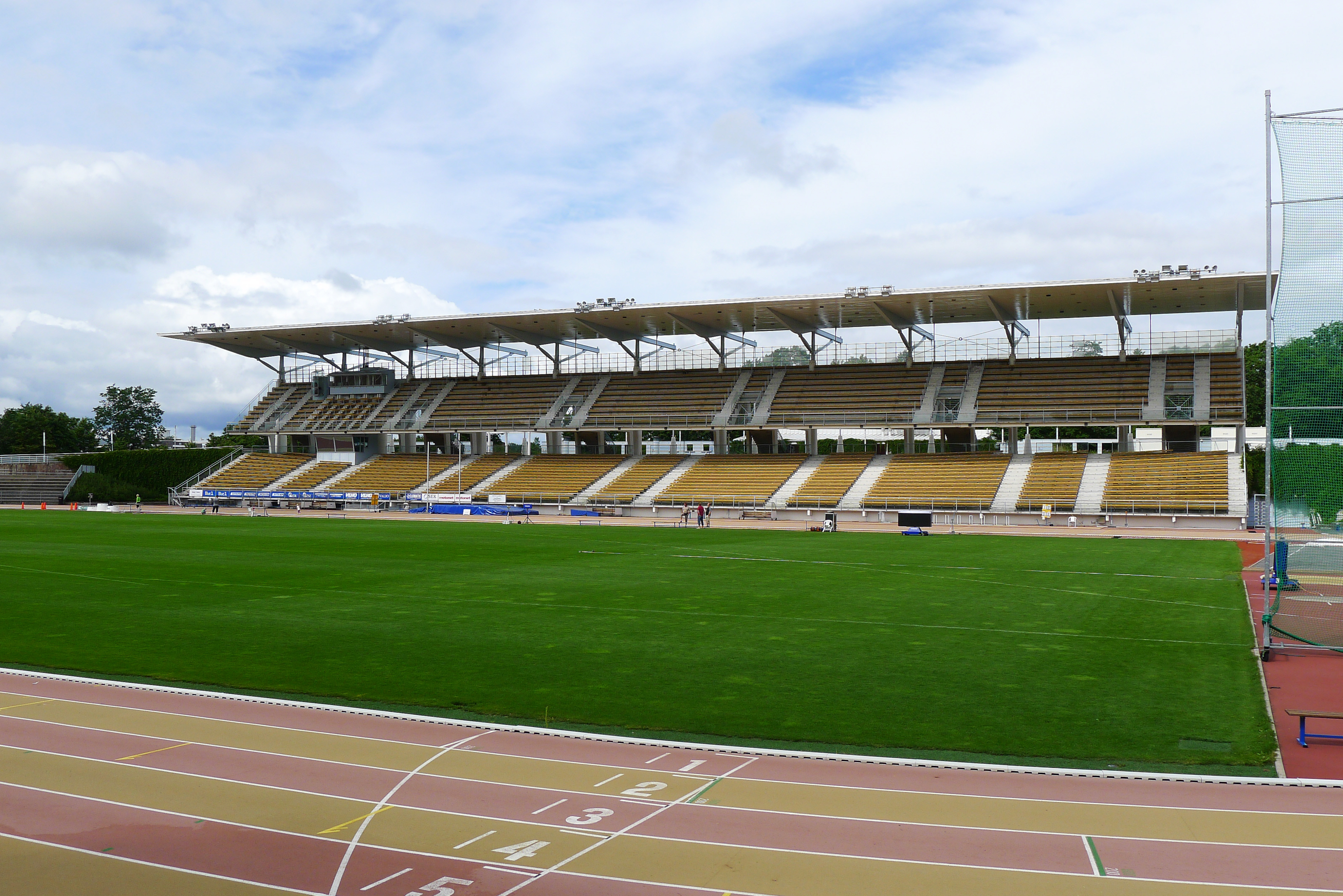
- Level: Masters
- Type: Outdoor
- Participation: 4802 athletes from 56 nations

1991 World Masters Athletics Championships is the ninth in a series of World Masters Athletics Outdoor Championships (called World Veterans Championships at the time) that took place in Turku, Finland from 18 to 28 July 1991.

The main venue was Paavo Nurmi Stadium. Satellite tracks were located in nearby municipalities of Raisio and Kaarina.

This edition of masters athletics Championships had a minimum age limit of 35 years for women and 40 years for men.

The governing body of this series is World Association of Veteran Athletes (WAVA). WAVA was formed during meeting at the inaugural edition of this series at Toronto in 1975, then officially founded during the second edition in 1977, then renamed as World Masters Athletics (WMA) at the Brisbane Championships in 2001.

This Championships was organized by WAVA in coordination with a Local Organising Committee (LOC) headed by Sten-Olof Hansen.

In addition to a full range of track and field events, non-stadia events included 10K Cross Country, 10K Race Walk (women), 20K Race Walk (men), and Marathon.

== South Africa ==
South Africa had been expelled by the International Amateur Athletic Federation (IAAF) in 1976 due to the apartheid policy of the South African government at that time. The participation of South African athletes in WAVA competitions had been at odds with the IAAF, specifically due to the 1977 WAVA constitution which had stated that

no competitor be barred because of race, religion, ethnic background, or national origin.

As a compromise, South Africans often competed at these Championships under the flag of other nations before 1987.

During General Assembly at the 1987 Championships, WAVA delegates approved a motion to amend the WAVA constitution and exclude countries whose national federation is suspended by the IAAF. Thus South African athletes were officially banned from these Championships, and would not be welcomed back until the 1993 edition in Miyazaki, after the abolition of apartheid and the readmittance of South Africa into IAAF in 1992.

== World Records ==
Past Championships results are archived at WMA. Additional archives are available from Museum of Masters Track & Field as a pdf book, in pdf newsletters from National Masters News, and as a searchable pdf extracted from the September 1991 newsletter.

Several masters world records were set at this Championships. World records for 1991 are from the lists of World Records in the Museum of Masters Track & Field pdf book, supplemented by another list of World Records in the September 1991 newsletter.

The winners from each of the age-group 100m races were invited to participate in a "Special WAVA Age-Graded 100", where runners were given distance handicaps based on WAVA age-graded tables. The winners were M55 Hugo Hartenstein (USA) in 10.55 and W40 Geraldine Otto (GER) in 11.22.

The blind sprinter Fritz Assmy, now in the M75 class and guided by his grandson, set new WRs in the 100m and 200m sprints, running in his assigned lane 8 to avoid getting in the way of other competitors. He had been guided by his son-in-law in 1977, 1979 and 1981, and by his son in 1983 and 1985. This was his last WAVA Championships; he would not compete in 1993 and would pass away in 2000.

=== Women ===
Event	Athlete(s)	Nationality	Performance
W55 100 Meters	Corrie Roovers-van den Bosch	NED	13.30
W50 400 Meters	Brunhilde Hoffmann	GER	1:02.89
W55 400 Meters	Carolyn Sue Cappetta	USA	1:05.48
W60 400 Meters	Ann Cooper	AUS	1:07.97
W55 800 Meters	Edeltraud Pohl	GER	2:37.42
W55 1500 Meters	Edeltraud Pohl	GER	5:12.43
W75 1500 Meters	Johanna Luther	GER	7:06.13
W80 1500 Meters	Anne Clarke	USA	8:36.90
W45 5000 Meters	Elaine Statham	GBR	17:40.77
W50 5000 Meters	Ida Hellwagner	AUS	18:05.33
W70 5000 Meters	Lenore Marvin	CAN	24:24.32
W45 10000 Meters	Elaine Statham	GBR	37:05.16
W60 10000 Meters	Marion Irvine	USA	43:23.17
W75 10000 Meters	Johanna Luther	GER	53:13.63
W35 2000 Meters Steeplechase	Victoria Adams	NZL	7:48.32
W45 2000 Meters Steeplechase	Margaret Orman	NZL	7:38.08
W55 2000 Meters Steeplechase	Sally Strazdins	USA	9:52.25
W60 2000 Meters Steeplechase	Ruth Carrier	CAN	11:04.56
W55 80 Meters Hurdles	Corrie Roovers-van den Bosch	NED	13.30
W75 80 Meters Hurdles	Rosaline Sole	NZL	27.89
W55 300 Meters Hurdles	Corrie Roovers-van den Bosch	NED	52.11
W60 300 Meters Hurdles	Betty Vosburgh	USA	59.78
W65 300 Meters Hurdles	Else Laine	FIN	68.23
W40 4 x 100 Meters Relay	Ingrid Meier, Geraldine Otto, Anita Bayha, Ellen Hees	GER	49.45
W45 4 x 100 Meters Relay	Karin Koschnitzke, Gerida Seibert, Doris Gallep, Anne-Kathrin Eriksen	GER	53.05
W55 4 x 100 Meters Relay	Edith Heise, Gertrude Muller, Rosemarie Chevalley, Lilo Rollfing	GER	61.72
W60 4 x 100 Meters Relay	Rosemarie Kveiskott, Christa Kreuzwieser, Ruth Hunkel, Christel Franzen	GER	57.88
W65 4 x 100 Meters Relay	Liselotte Schule, Paula Schneiderhan, Johanna Gelbrich, Elizabeth Haule	GER	67.20
W70 4 x 100 Meters Relay	Diane Friedman, Carol Peebles, Pearl Mehl, Marie Stafford	USA	80.77
W45 4 x 400 Meters Relay	Erika Sauer, Doris Gallep, Gerida Seibert, Karin Koschnitzke	GER	4:29.58
W50 4 x 400 Meters Relay	Brunhilde Hoffmann, Ingrid Holzknecht, Gisela Blank, Friderun Kümmerle-Valk	GER	4:35.77
W55 4 x 400 Meters Relay	Kathy McIntyre, Christel Miller, Lucy Ann Brobst, Betty Vosburgh	USA	5:07.58
W40 5K Race Walk	Viisha Sedlak	USA	24:17.2
W50 5K Race Walk	Veino Heikkila	FIN	25:54.7
W80 5K Race Walk	Margit Lindgren	SWE	38:02.2
W50 Long Jump	Christiane Schmalbruch	GER	5.02
W70 Long Jump	Mary Wixey	GBR	3.40
W35 Triple Jump	Arja Jussila	FIN	11.57
W40 Triple Jump	Anna Włodarczyk	POL	12.07
W50 Triple Jump	Helen Ray Searle	AUS	9.77
W70 Triple Jump	Mary Wixey	GBR	6.72
W80 Triple Jump	Ruth Frith	AUS	5.22
W55 High Jump	Taisija Tchentchik	URS	1.43
W60 High Jump	Elsa Enarsson	SWE	1.27
W80 High Jump	Margareta Thesleff Sarvana	FIN	0.88
W55 Shot Put	Sigrun Kofink	GER	14.47
W60 Shot Put	Marianne Hamm	GER	11.23
W65 Shot Put	Totti Kasekamp	URS	10.06
W70 Shot Put	Katerine Smildzina	URS	8.12
W85 Shot Put	Irja Sarnama	FIN	5.48
W50 Discus Throw	Ljudmila Hmelevskaja	URS	44.48
W75 Discus Throw	Annchen Reile	GER	20.84
M40 Hammer throw	Inge Faldager	DEN	42.12
W50 Hammer throw	Helen Ray Searle	AUS	41.86
W55 Hammer throw	Antonina Ivanova	URS	40.82
W70 Hammer throw	Ilse Bellin	GER	29.40
W50 Javelin Throw	Elvīra Ozoliņa	URS	44.90
W60 Javelin Throw	Janina Paksyte	URS	32.24
W65 Javelin Throw	Totti Kasekamp	URS	26.54
W75 Javelin Throw	Johanna Gelbrich	GER	22.70
W85 Javelin Throw	Irja Sarnama	FIN	13.74
W50 Heptathlon	Friderun Kümmerle-Valk	GER	5729
W55 Heptathlon	Corrie Roovers-van den Bosch	NED	6171

=== Men ===
Event	Athlete(s)	Nationality	Performance
M75 100 Meters	Fritz Assmy	GER	14.06
M95 100 Meters	Joginder Singh	IND	20.82
M75 200 Meters	Fritz Assmy	GER	29.07
M90 200 Meters	Murthy Narayana	IND	44.77
M95 200 Meters	Joginder Singh	IND	48.42
M60 400 Meters	Wilhelm Selzer	GER	57.36
M65 400 Meters	Jack Greenwood	USA	1:00.23
M90 400 Meters	Murthy Narayana	IND	1:59.76
M70 800 Meters	James Lytjen	USA	2:27.57
M95 800 Meters	Herbert S. Kirk	USA	6:02.94
M50 5000 Meters	Antonio Villanueva	MEX	14:55.60
M70 5000 Meters	Warren Utes	USA	18:43.61
M95 5000 Meters	Herbert S. Kirk	USA	50:23.53
M50 10000 Meters	Ron Robertson	NZL	31:01.90
M60 10000 Meters	Luciano Acquarone	ITA	34:14.88
M70 10000 Meters	Warren Utes	USA	38:23.69
M50 3000 Meters Steeplechase	Ron Robertson	NZL	9:43.97
M70 80 Meters Hurdles	Hans Gilli	SUI	14.42
M75 80 Meters Hurdles	Herbert Miller	USA	15.37
M50 100 Meters Hurdles	Charley Miller	USA	15.02
M55 100 Meters Hurdles	Lars Lindhe	SWE	15.98
M65 100 Meters Hurdles	Jack Greenwood	USA	16.30
M65 300 Meters Hurdles	Jack Greenwood	USA	45.20
M75 300 Meters Hurdles	Reino Taskinen	FIN	59.89
M80 300 Meters Hurdles	Erkki Haapalainen	FIN	75.99
M45 4 x 100 Meters Relay	Josef Bolsinger, Walter Gossmann, Manfred Bellmann, Walter Toscher	GER	44.74
M55 4 x 100 Meters Relay	John Darrell, Matthew Brown, Milton Newton, Hugo Bartenstein	USA	47.94
M65 4 x 100 Meters Relay	Robert Watanabe, Melvin Larsen, Jim Law, Jack Greenwood	USA	50.21
M65 4 x 400 Meters Relay	Rudolph Valentine, Oscar Harris, Jim Law, Jack Greenwood	USA	4:19.18
M75 4 x 100 Meters Relay	Pentti Vuorela, Yrjö Hupponen, Reino Taskinen, Ahti Pajunen	FIN	63.57
M45 5K Race Walk	Eero Heman	FIN	21:45.6
M55 5K Race Walk	Vladimir Golubnichiy	URS	22:44.5
M60 Marathon	Luciano Acquarone	ITA	2:38:15
M70 Long Jump	Gudmund Skrivervik	NOR	4.98
M95 Long Jump	Joginder Singh	IND	21.5
M60 Triple Jump	Hermann Strauss	GER	12.33
M65 Triple Jump	Matti Järvinen	FIN	11.11
M70 Triple Jump	Gudmund Skrivervik	NOR	10.17
M45 High Jump	Mark Gelnov	URS	1.92
M55 High Jump	Horst Mandl	AUT	1.77
M80 Pole Vault	Ahti Pajunen	FIN	2.32
M50 Shot Put	Klaus Liedtke	GER	18.45
M80 Shot Put	Osmo Renvall	FIN	11.00
M95 Shot Put	Joginder Singh	IND	6.37
M70 Discus Throw	Kauko Jouppila	FIN	47.76
M80 Discus Throw	Osmo Renvall	FIN	37.86
M95 Discus Throw	Joginder Singh	IND	16.12
M65 Hammer throw	Pentti Saarikoski	FIN	51.76
M85 Javelin Throw	Masami Okazaki	JPN	22.94
M95 Javelin Throw	Joginder Singh	IND	21.16
