= 2018 World Masters Athletics Championships =

Coordinates: 36.6812°N 4.4579°W

- Dates: 4 - 16 September 2018
- Host city: Málaga, Spain
- Venue: Estadio Ciudad de Málaga
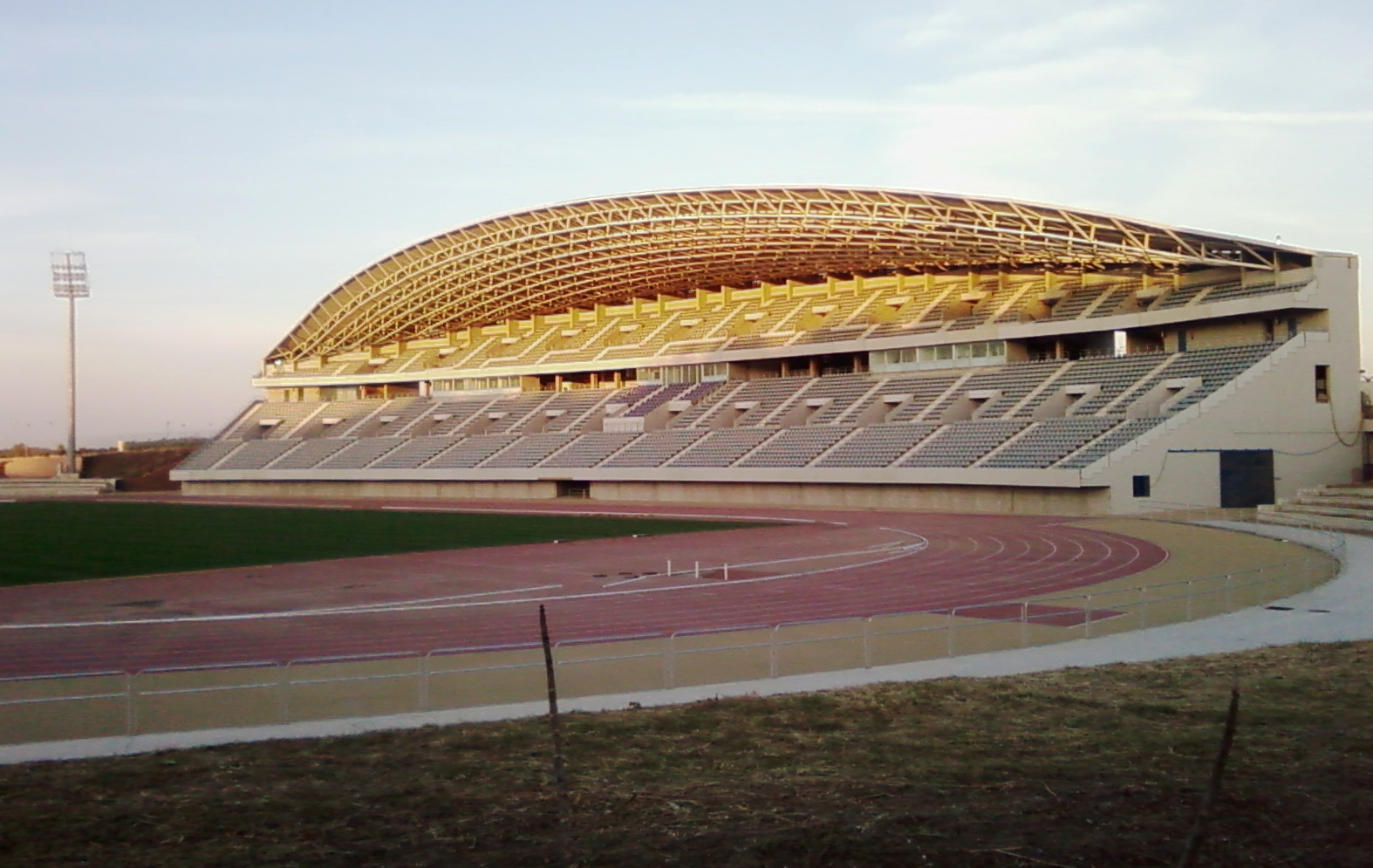
- Level: Masters
- Type: Outdoor
- Participation: 8,197 athletes from 101 nations

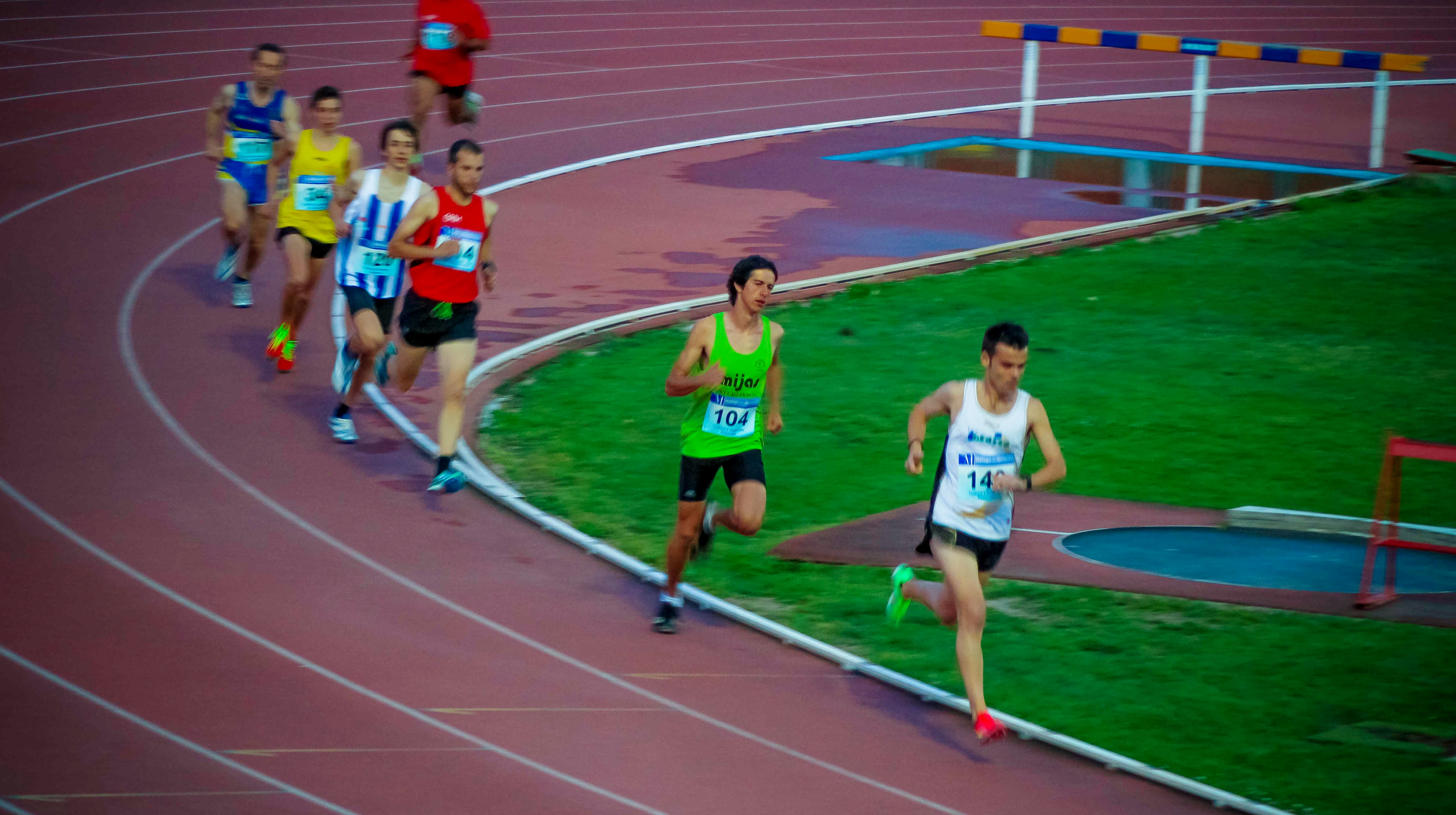
Ciudad Deportiva de Carranque

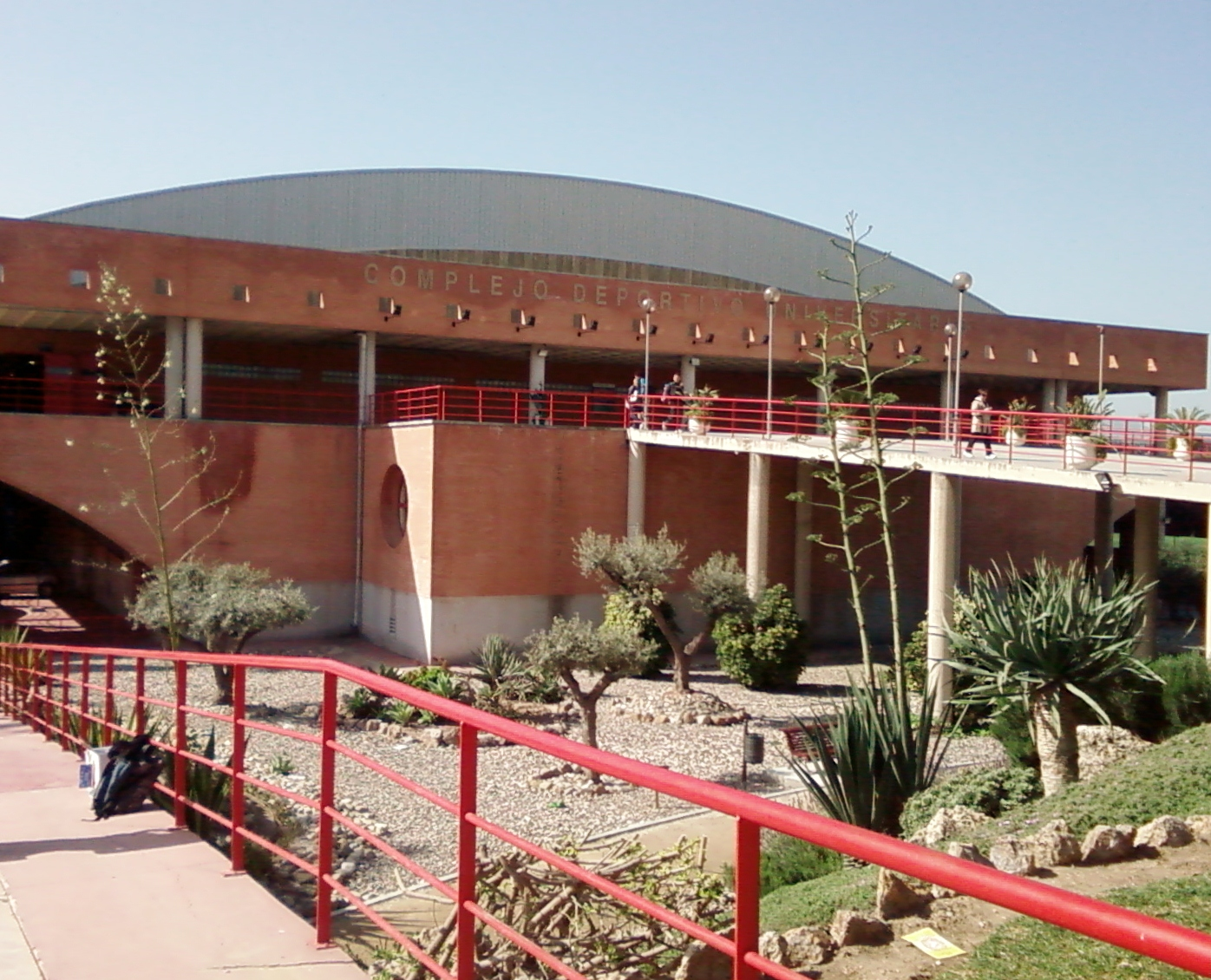
Complejo Deportivo Universitario

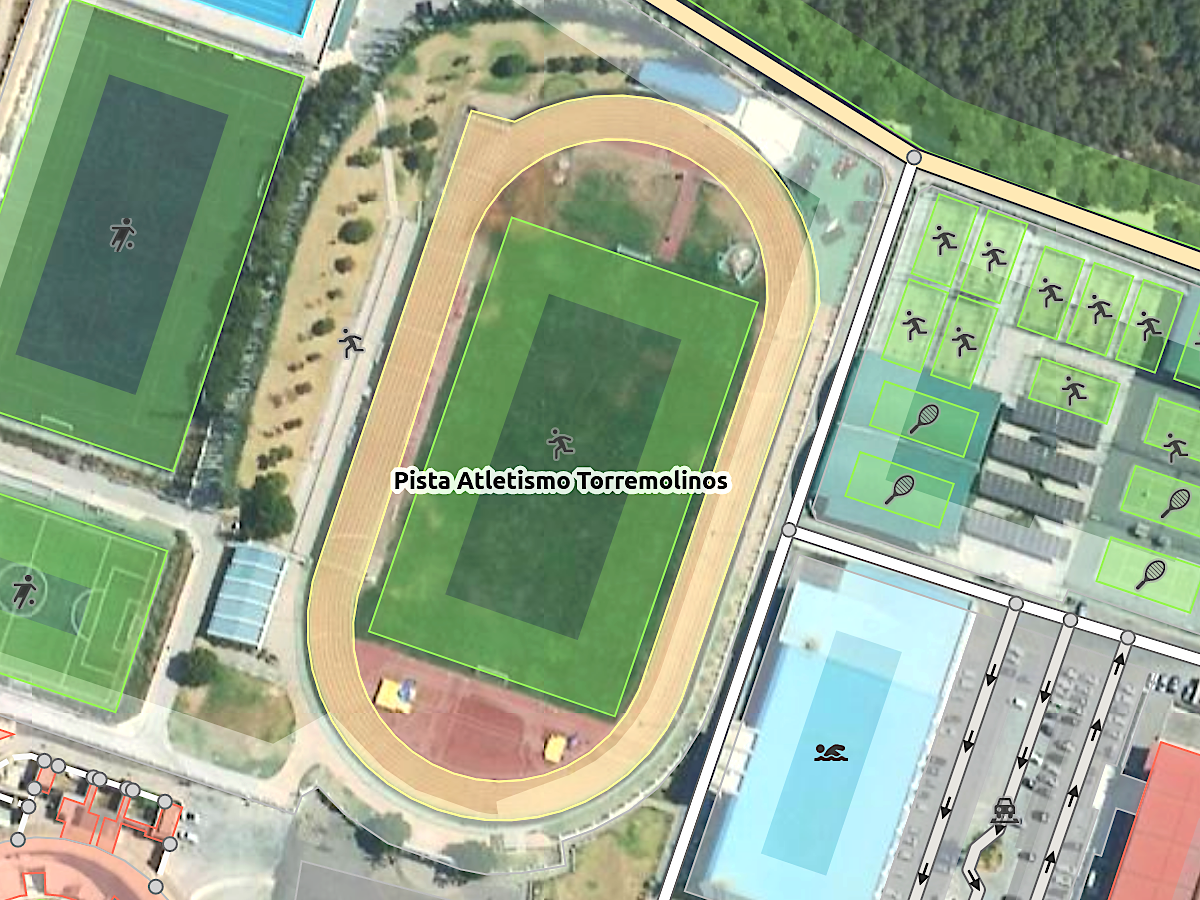
Pista Atletismo Torremolinos

2018 World Masters Athletics Championships is the 23rd in a series of World Masters Athletics Outdoor Championships that took place along the Costa del Sol in Málaga and Torremolinos, Spain from 4 to 16 September 2018. This was the second even year of this biennial series as beginning in 2016 at Perth, Australia, the Championships moved to be held in even-numbered years to avoid conflict with the quadrennial World Masters Games, which had been held in odd-numbered years since 2005.

The main venue was Estadio Ciudad de Málaga (MAL). Supplemental venues included Ciudad Deportiva de Carranque (CAR), Complejo Deportivo Universitario (UNI), and Pista Atletismo Torremolinos in the Estadio Polideportivo Ciudad de Torremolinos complex (TOR). The three-letter codes for the venues are used in the results.

This Championships was organized by World Masters Athletics (WMA) in coordination with a Local Organising Committee (LOC) led by Francisco de la Torre, Mayor of Málaga.

The WMA is the global governing body of the sport of athletics for athletes 35 years of age or older, setting rules for masters athletics competition.

At the 2016 General Assembly, a motion was passed to change two events after the 2016 Championships:

- The Marathon would be replaced by the Half Marathon.
- The 10K Road Race would be replaced by the 10K Race Walk.

Thus, in addition to a full range of track and field events, non-stadia events in this Championships included 8K Cross Country, 10K Road Race, 10K Race Walk, 20K Race Walk and Half Marathon.

== Controversy ==
The Spanish government requested, through Real Federación Española de Atletismo, that the country of Gibraltar not be permitted to participate in the Championships. Athletes from Gibraltar could compete as "neutral" athletes and cannot wear their national uniform. In protest, four out of the five athletes from Gibraltar decided to withdraw and boycott the Championships.

== Results ==
Official daily results are listed at Malaga2018, and archived at RFEA. Past Championships results are archived at WMA; the 2018 results are summarized in a Medals Table and a Records Table. Additional archives are available from British Masters Athletic Federation as a searchable pdf, and from Victorian Masters Athletics as a searchable pdf.

Masters world records set at this Championships are listed below and are based on the WMA Records Table unless otherwise noted. More complete lists of medalists are contained in separate articles for women and for men.

=== Women ===
World records are listed below.

Event	Athlete(s)	Nationality	Performance
W65 100 Meters	Karla Del Grande	CAN	14.04
W65 200 Meters	Karla Del Grande	CAN	28.83
W75 200 Meters	Carol LaFayette-Boyd	CAN	31.56
W80 800 Meters	Yoko Nakano	JPN	3:30.41
W80 5000 Meters	Yoko Nakano	JPN	25:40.14
W75 80 Meters Hurdles	Marianne Maier	AUT	17.37
W45 2K Steeplechase	Minori Hayakari	JPN	6:51.51
W60 10K Race Walk	Lynette Ventris	AUS	53:26
W75 20K Race Walk	Hannele Kivistö	FIN	2:30:30
W55 4 x 100 Meters Relay; Video on YouTube	Sandy Triolo, Adriene Allen, Kathleen Shook, Joy Upshaw	USA	54.05
W60 4 x 400 Meters Relay	Hilary West, Helen Godsell, Jane Horder, Caroline Powell	GBR	4:41.85
W80 4 x 400 Meters Relay	Rose Green, Jean Daprano, Carolyn Langenwalter, Lynne Hurrell	USA	7:59.18
W75 High Jump	Carol LaFayette-Boyd	CAN	1.24
W75 Shot Put	Marianne Maier	AUT	12.12
W80 Shot Put	Evaun Williams	GBR	10.07
W80 Hammer throw	Evaun Williams	GBR	37.85
W80 Hammer throw	Evaun Williams	GBR	35.16
W90 Hammer throw	Julia Huapaya	PER	18.62
W80 Weight Throw	Evaun Williams	GBR	12.68
W65 Javelin Throw	Linda Cohn	USA	34.81
W70 Javelin Throw	Jarmila Klimesova	CZE	27.95
W80 Javelin Throw	Evaun Williams	GBR	26.06
W80 Javelin Throw	Evaun Williams	GBR	24.65
W80 Throws Pentathlon	Evaun Williams	GBR	6080
W75 Heptathlon	Marianne Maier	AUT	6658
W75 Half Marathon	Josette Maillard	FRA	2:03:35
W80 Half Marathon	Yoko Nakano	JPN	2:07:36

=== Men ===
World records are listed below.

Event	Athlete(s)	Nationality	Performance
M90 200 Meters	Yoshiyuki Shimizu	BRA	37.16
M70 400 Meters	Charles Allie	USA	57.26
M90 400 Meters	Yoshiyuki Shimizu	BRA	1:29.35
M85 4 x 400 Meters Relay	Bingxiang Fei, Fucheng Qiu, Guiben Sun, Yide Shi	CHN	7:50.66
M55 Long Jump	Gianni Becatti	ITA	6.50
M100 Triple Jump	Giuseppe Ottaviani	ITA	2.23
M70 Weight Throw	Arild Busterud	NOR	23.15
M70 Javelin Throw	Esa Kiuru	FIN	53.13
M55 Throws Pentathlon	Norbert Demmel	GER	5103
M70 Throws Pentathlon	Arild Busterud	NOR	5067
M50 Decathlon	Thomas Stewens	GER	8068
M85 Decathlon	Ted Rowan	CAN	7110
M40 Half Marathon	Silas Sang	KEN	1:07:22
