= 2014 World Masters Athletics Indoor Championships =

Coordinates: 47.5007°N 19.1006°E

- Dates: 25-30 March 2014
- Host city: Budapest, Hungary
- Venue: SYMA Sports and Conference Centre
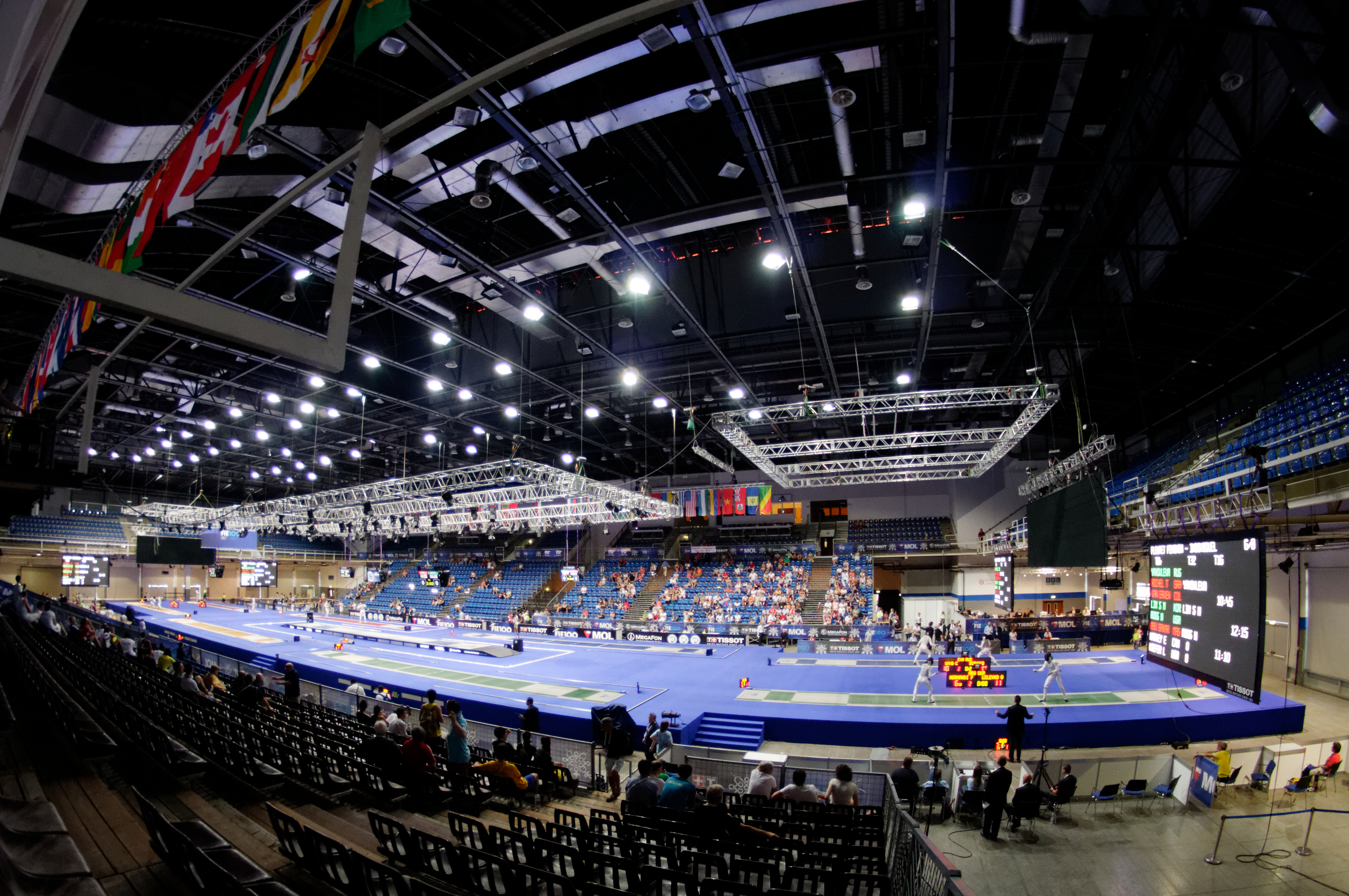
- Level: Masters
- Type: Indoor
- Participation: 3383 athletes from 69 nations
- Official website: Archived 2014-08-20 at the Wayback Machine

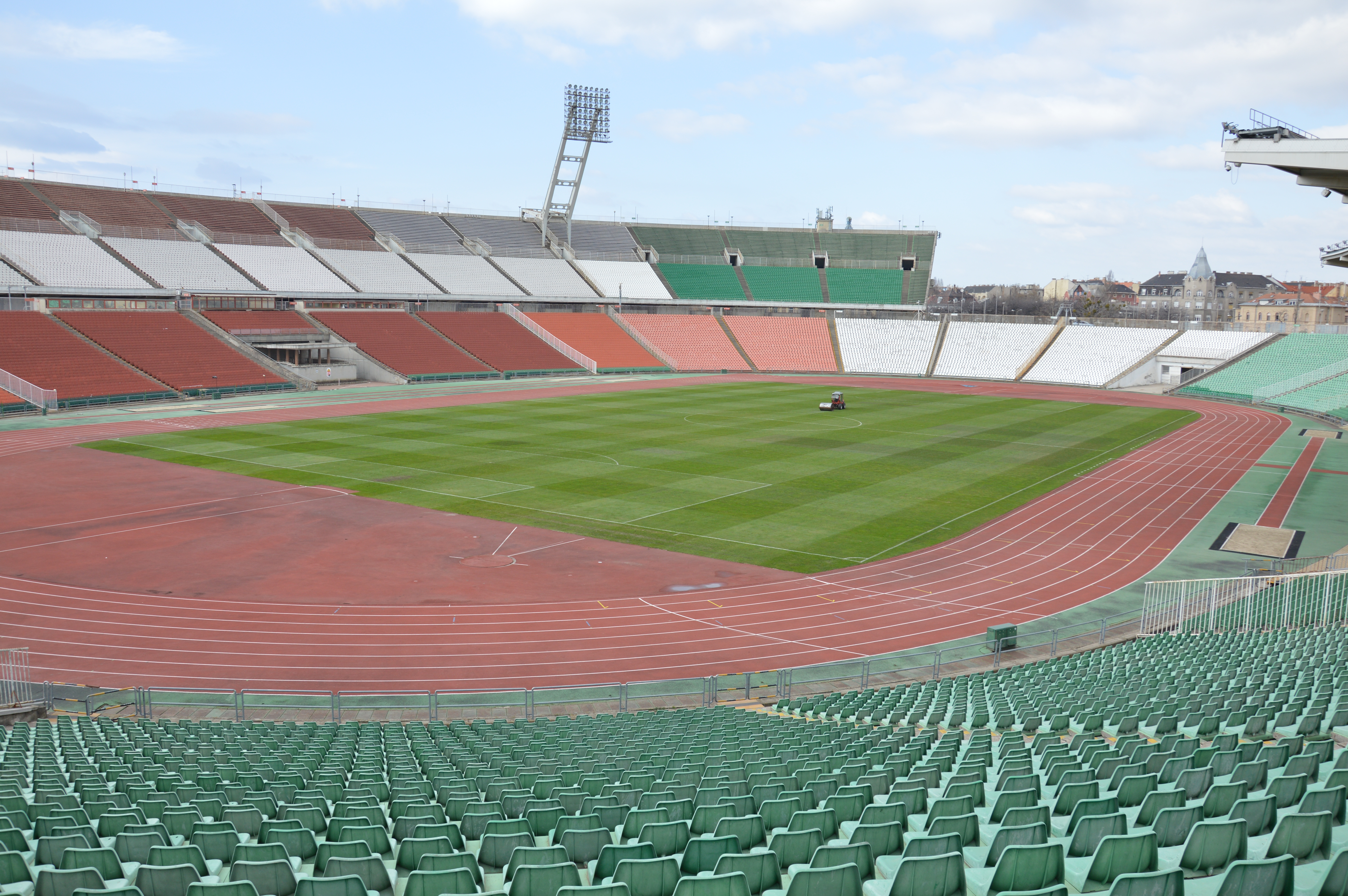
Ferenc Puskás Stadium in 2014

2014 World Masters Athletics Indoor Championships is the sixth in a series of World Masters Athletics Indoor Championships (also called World Masters Athletics Championships Indoor, or WMACi). This sixth edition took place in Budapest, Hungary, from 25 to 30 March 2014.

The main venue was SYMA Sport- és Rendezvényközpont (English: SYMA Sports and Conference Centre), which has a banked indoor track where the turns are raised to neutralize the centrifugal force of athletes running the curves. Supplemental venues included Ferenc Puskás Stadium (demolished in 2017), KSI for throwing events, and City Park (Hungarian: Városliget) for non-stadia road events.

This Championships was organized by World Masters Athletics (WMA) in coordination with a Local Organising Committee (LOC): Márton Gyulai, Chairman, Hungarian Athletics Association.

The WMA is the global governing body of the sport of athletics for athletes 35 years of age or older, setting rules for masters athletics competition.

A full range of indoor track and field events were held. In addition to indoor competition, non-stadia events included Half Marathon, 10K Race Walk, Weight Throw, Hammer throw, Discus Throw and Javelin Throw.

== World Records ==
Past Championships results are archived at WMA. Additional archives are available from European Masters Athletics as a searchable pdf, and from British Masters Athletic Federation. in HTML format. USATF Masters keeps a list of American record holders. Canadian Masters Athletics keeps an archive of Canadian athletes and results at WMA Championships. Official results are no longer available from the archived event website, but can be retrieved from European Masters Athletics.

Several masters world records were set at this Indoor Championships. World records for 2014 are from WMA unless otherwise noted.

=== Women ===
Event	Athlete(s)	Nationality	Performance
W60 60 Meters	Karla Del Grande	CAN	8.57
W95 60 Meters	Olga Kotelko	CAN	16.53
W60 200 Meters	Karla Del Grande on YouTube	CAN	28.23
W95 200 Meters	Olga Kotelko	CAN	1:14.14
W60 400 Meters	Caroline Powell	GBR	64.76
W60 400 Meters	Karla Del Grande	CAN	67.13
W80 400 Meters	Emma Mazzenga	ITA	1:31.10i
W50 800 Meters	Clare Elms	GBR	2:21.27
W80 800 Meters	Alice Cole	CAN	3:39.51
W50 1500 Meters	Clare Elms	GBR	4:44.89
W80 1500 Meters	Helly Visser	CAN	7:39.94
W65 Half Marathon	Emilia Vaquero Sanchez	ESP	1:37:29
W80 Half Marathon	Denise Leclerc	FRA	2:12:26.70
W75 Long Jump	Christiane Schmalbruch	GER	3.71
W85 Long Jump	Senni Sopanen	FIN	2.01
W95 Long Jump	Olga Kotelko	CAN	1.57
W45 Triple Jump	Senni Sopanen	FRA	2.01
W75 Triple Jump	Christiane Schmalbruch	GER	7.87
W85 Triple Jump	Senni Sopanen	FIN	4.26
W95 Triple Jump	Olga Kotelko	CAN	3.68
W40 High Jump	Oana Manuela Pantelimon	ROU	1.80
W75 High Jump	Christiane Schmalbruch	GER	1.17
W95 High Jump	Olga Kotelko	CAN	0.78 i
W45 Pole Vault	Irie Hill	GBR	3.55
W60 Shot Put	Mihaela Loghin	ROU	13.39
W80 Shot Put	Susanne Wissinger	GER	10.07
W95 Shot Put	Olga Kotelko	CAN	4.73
W65 Weight Throw	Myrle Mensey	USA	16.91
W80 Weight Throw	Susanne Wissinger	GER	10.75
W95 Weight Throw	Olga Kotelko	CAN	6.97
W65 Javelin Throw	Jarmila Klimešová	CZE	30.79
W95 Javelin Throw	Olga Kotelko	CAN	11.24
W80 Hammer throw	Susanne Wissinger	GER	29.58
W95 Hammer throw	Olga Kotelko	CAN	14.76
W35 60 Meters Hurdles Indoor Pentathlon	Jennifer Schmelter	GER	9.02
W40 60 Meters Hurdles Indoor Pentathlon	Christina Bosch	GER	9.68
W45 60 Meters Hurdles Indoor Pentathlon	Kirsti Siekkinen	FIN	9.45
W50 60 Meters Hurdles Indoor Pentathlon	Gaye Clarke	GBR	10.34
W60 60 Meters Hurdles Indoor Pentathlon	Wilma Perkins	AUS	11.28
W65 60 Meters Hurdles Indoor Pentathlon	Terhi Kokkonen	FIN	11.18
W45 800 Meters Indoor Pentathlon	Paola Olivari	CHI	2:34.01
W50 800 Meters Indoor Pentathlon	Annika Savolainen	FIN	3:15.96
W60 800 Meters Indoor Pentathlon	Jocelyne Pater	BEL	3:02.69
W70 Pentathlon	Riet Jonkers-Slegers	NED	4676
W35 4 x 200 Meters Relay	Owusu Lesley, Susan Young, Susie McLoughlin, Ellena Ruddock	GBR IRL	1:43.74
W55 4 x 200 Meters Relay	Joan Trimble, Carole Filer, Averil Mcclelland, Jane Horder	GBR IRL	1:55.90
W60 4 x 200 Meters Relay	Anne Nelson, Caroline Marler, Sue Dassie, Caroline Powell	GBR IRL	2:05.79
W65 4 x 200 Meters Relay	Karin Foerster, Brigitte Schommler, Waltraud Kraehe, Ingrid Meier	GER	2:09.74
W60 4 x 400 Meters Relay	Lynne Choate, Wilma Perkins, Linda Lynch, Jeanette Flynn	AUS	2:07.39

=== Men ===
Event	Athlete(s)	Nationality	Performance
M85 400 Meters	Earl Fee	CAN	1:21.26
M85 800 Meters	Earl Fee	CAN	3:11.09
M35 1000 Meters	Oscar Gonzalez	ESP	2:48.50
M60 1500 Meters	Brian Lynch	IRL	4:26.62
M35 60 Meters Hurdles Indoor Pentathlon	Oscar Gonzalez	ESP	8.33
M70 60 Meters Hurdles	Rolf Geese	GER	9.76
M60 Long Jump	Adrian Neagu	ROM	5.93
M95 Triple Jump	Giuseppe Ottaviani	ITA	4.44
M75 Pole Vault	Zoltan Kurunczi 2.94m record on YouTube	HUN	3.00
M45 Shot Put	Ivan Ivancic	YUG	20.40
M75 Shot Put	Karl-Heinz Marg	GER	14.48
M85 Shot Put	Franz Gries	GER	11.24
M50 Weight Throw	Stephen Whyte	GBR	22.10
M80 Weight Throw	Henryk Plukarz	SWE	16.53
M35 Pentathlon	Oscar Gonzales Garrido	ESP	4108
M50 Pentathlon	Jean Luc Duez	FRA	4283
M70 Pentathlon	Rolf Geese	GER	4617
M55 4 x 200 Meters Relay	Tennyson James, Ian Broadhurst, Peter Hickey, Douglas Donald on YouTube	GBR IRL	1:40.58
M70 4 x 200 Meters Relay	Fritz Reichle, Klaus Gailus, Hans Schuck, Friedhelm Adorf	GER	1:56.34
M75 4 x 200 Meters Relay	Hermann Beckering, Horst Hufnagel, Adolf Nehren, Guido Müller	GER	2:00.58
M80 4 x 200 Meters Relay	Girault, M Konopka, F Hoppe, H Muller	GER	2:45.93
M65 3000 Meters Race Walk	Ian Richards	GBR	14:23.80
M35 Half Marathon	Vladimir Srb	CZE	1:09:25.20
M40 Half Marathon	Joachim Nshimirimana	ITA	1:09:04.70
M45 Half Marathon	Sakhri Azzedine	ALG	1:11:04.50
M50 Half Marathon	Milan Eror	AUT	1:13:58.50
M55 Half Marathon	Marc Bultinck	BEL	1:15:25.50
M60 Half Marathon	Rolando Di Marco	ITA	1:18:20.00
M65 Half Marathon	Kauko Kuningas	FIN	1:22:30.50
M70 Half Marathon	Andrea Nicolai	ITA	1:30:08.50
M75 Half Marathon	Klemens Wittig	GER	1:36:45.20
M80 Half Marathon	Armin Zosel	GER	1:53:22.50
M35 1 Mile Run Milatary	csapata Tuzszerészek	HUN	7:07.83
