= 2012 World Masters Athletics Indoor Championships =

Coordinates: 62.2361305°N 25.718131°E

- Dates: 3-8 April 2012
- Host city: Jyvaskyla, Finland
- Venue: Hipposhalli
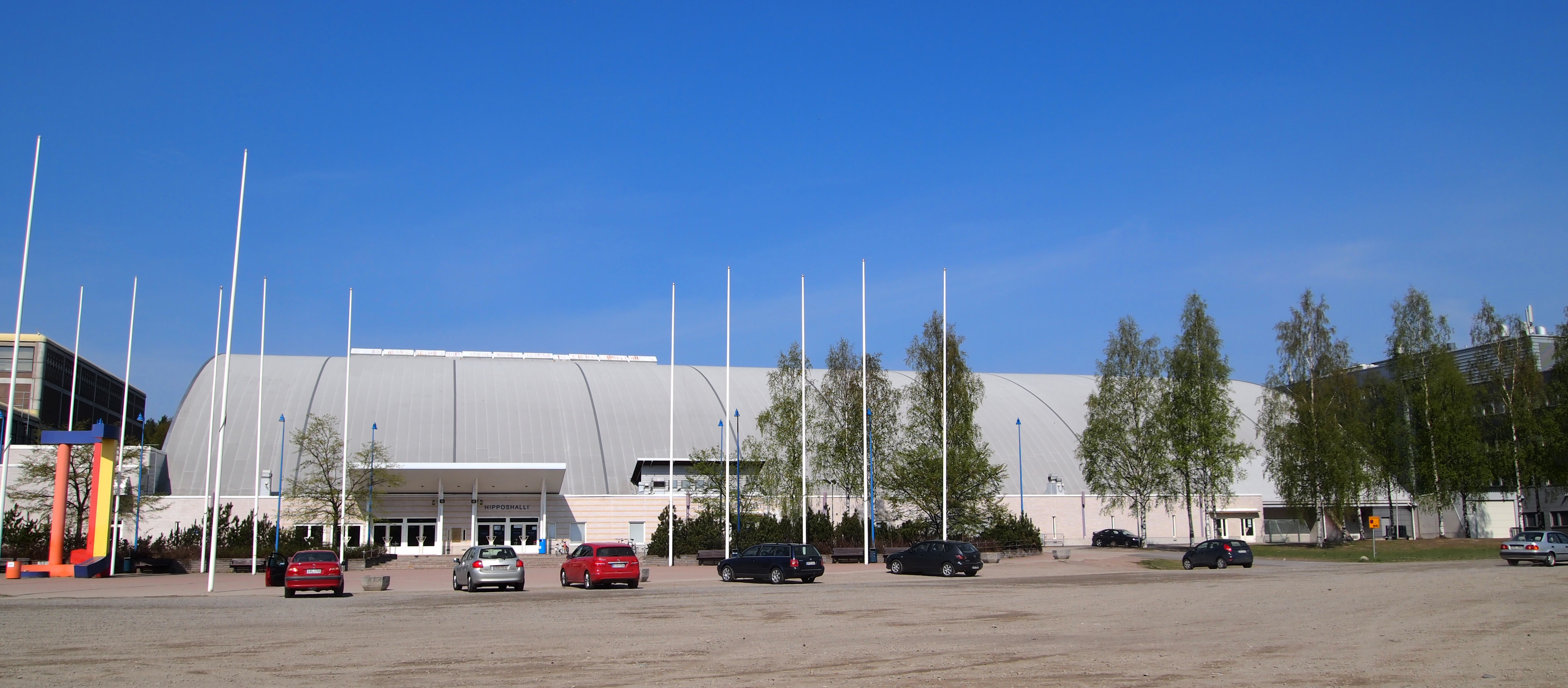
- Level: Masters
- Type: Indoor
- Participation: 2720 athletes from 66 nations
- Official website: web.archive.org/web/20120415132945/http://wma2012.jyvaskyla.fi/

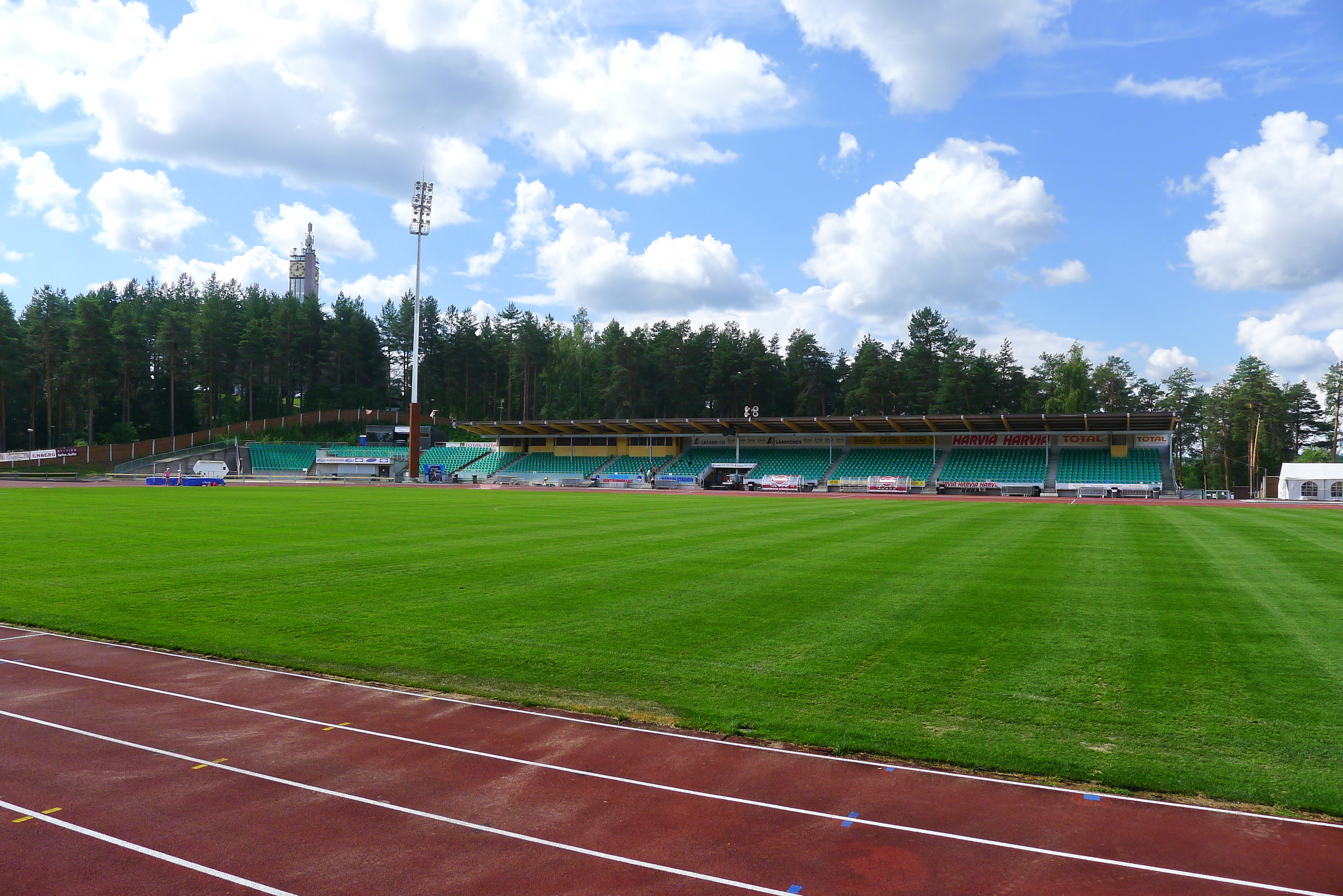
Harjun stadion

2012 World Masters Athletics Indoor Championships is the fifth in a series of World Masters Athletics Indoor Championships (also called World Masters Athletics Championships Indoor, or WMACi). This fifth edition took place in Jyvaskyla, Finland, from 3 to 8 April 2012.

The main venue was Hipposhalli (English: Hippos Hall), which has a banked indoor track where the turns are raised to neutralize the centrifugal force of athletes running the curves. Supplemental venues included Harjun stadion for throwing events and Cross Country, shore of Lake Jyväsjärvi for Half Marathon, and Jyväskylä Harbour for road race walking competition.

This Championships was organized by World Masters Athletics (WMA) in coordination with a Local Organising Committee (LOC): City of Jyväskylä, Mikko Pajunen,Kalevi Olin.

The WMA is the global governing body of the sport of athletics for athletes 35 years of age or older, setting rules for masters athletics competition.

A full range of indoor track and field events were held. In addition to indoor competition, non-stadia events included Half Marathon, 8K Cross Country, 10K Race Walk, Weight Throw, Hammer throw, Discus Throw and Javelin Throw.

== Golden Baton ==
To honour the fair play challenge of Finland's Clean Win anti-doping campaign, a symbolic golden baton was passed from the European Airgun Championships that took place in February at Vierumaki; the golden baton was later passed to the Finland Olympic Qualification Tournament of Wrestling and World University Wrestling Championships in Kuortane in October. Golden batons were also used by relay teams at this Indoor Championships.

== World Records ==
Past Championships results are archived at WMA. Additional archives are available from European Masters Athletics as a searchable pdf, and from British Masters Athletic Federation. as a searchable pdf. USATF Masters keeps a list of American record holders. Canadian Masters Athletics keeps an archive of Canadian athletes and results at WMA Championships.

Several masters world records were set at this Indoor Championships. World records for 2012 are from WMA unless otherwise noted.

=== Women ===
Event	Athlete(s)	Nationality	Performance
W55 60 Meters	Tilly Jacobs	NED	8.44
W65 60 Meters	Ingrid Meier	GER	8.80
W75 60 Meters	Christa Bortignon	CAN	10.04
W65 200 Meters	Ingrid Meier	GER	30.10
W55 400 Meters	Caroline Powell	GBR	1:02.65
W80 400 Meters	Ruth Helfenstein	SUI	1:54.97
W90 400 Meters	Olga Kotelko	CAN	3:31.50
W75 800 Meters	Jean Daprano	USA	3:16.21
W90 800 Meters	Olga Kotelko	CAN	8:49.15
W45 High Jump	Dinah Heymans	RSA	1.65
W50 High Jump	Auli Marttinen	FIN	1.56
W90 High Jump	Olga Kotelko	CAN	0.76
W65 Long Jump	Ingrid Meier	GER	4.36
W75 Long Jump	Christa Bortignon	CAN	3.67
W65 Triple Jump	Phil Raschker	USA	8.76
W75 Weight Throw	Irene Merjamaa	FIN	10.93
W80 Weight Throw	Rachel Hanssens	BEL	9.44
W85 Weight Throw	Hilja Bakhoff	EST	8.72
W90 Weight Throw	Olga Kotelko	CAN	7.24
W85 Hammer throw	Hilja Bakhoff	EST	20.36
W50 Shot Put	Alexandra Marghieva	MDA	14.53
W85 Shot Put	Hilja Bakhoff	EST	7.32
W55 3000 Meters Race Walk	Lynette Ventris	AUS	14:51.24
W55 10K Race Walk	Lynette Ventris	AUS	49:59
W65 Pentathlon	Phil Raschker	USA	4713
W90 Pentathlon	Olga Kotelko	CAN	2326
W60 4 x 200 Meters Relay	Moira West, Anne Nelson, Agnes Hitchmough, Jean Fail	GBR	2:11.52

=== Men ===
Event	Athlete(s)	Nationality	Performance
M65 60 Meters	Vladimir Vybostok	SVK	7.81
M75 60 Meters	Robert Lida	USA	8.56
M75 200 Meters	Robert Lida	USA	27.64 i
M85 High Jump	Nils-Bertil Nevrup	SWE	1.22
M65 Long Jump	Vesa Maki	FIN	5.35
M85 Long Jump	Aate Lehtimäki	FIN	3.60
M75 Triple Jump	Stig Bäcklund	FIN	9.69
M85 Weight Throw	Matti Järvinen	FIN	13.02
M80 Shot Put	Leo Saarinen	FIN	13.68
M90 Shot Put	Toimi Ahvenjärvi	FIN	9.68
M65 3000 Meters Race Walk	Andrew Jamieson	AUS	14:39.77
M85 3000 Meters Race Walk	Guenter Ciesielski	GER	22:00.31
M40 Pentathlon	Mattias Sunneborn on YouTube	SWE	4316
M45 Pentathlon	Thomas Stewens	GER	4066
M85 4 x 200 Meters Relay	Yrjo Torikka, Aatos Sainio, Pentti Saukkosaari, Kurt Byggmastar	FIN	3:04.61
