= Masters W85 100 metres world record progression =

This is the progression of world record improvements of the 100 metres W85 division of Masters athletics.

Key

Incomplete information Wind aided Pending

Hand	Auto	Wind	Athlete	Nationality	Birthdate	Age	Location	Date
	17.97	(−0.8 m/s)	Kathy Bergen	United States	24 December 1939	85 years, 206 days	Huntsville	18 July 2025
	18.14	0.0	Christa Bortignon	Canada	29 January 1937	85 years, 196 days	Surrey	13 August 2022
	18.49	+0.6	Christa Bortignon	Canada	29 January 1937	85 years, 98 days	Eugene	7 May 2022
	18.45	+1.3	Christa Bortignon	Canada	29 January 1937	85 years, 85 days	Delta	24 April 2022
	19.37	+0.5	Emiko Saito	Japan	13 March 1931	87 years, 222 days	Tokyo	21 October 2018
	19.38	+0.5	Emiko Saito	Japan	13 March 1931	86 years, 244 days	Kofu	12 November 2017
	19.82	+0.9	Emiko Saito	Japan	13 March 1931	85 years, 140 days	Chiba	31 July 2016
	19.83	0.0	Mitsu Morita	Japan	1923	85	Nagayama	20 July 2008
	21.18	+0.3	Nora Wedemo	Sweden	19 April 1913	86 years, 124 days	Norrtälje	21 August 1999
	23.78	+0.1	Isobel Saumier Cunningham	Canada	17 February 1914	85 years, 124 days	Toronto	21 June 1999
