= Masters W85 triple jump world record progression =

This is the progression of world record improvements of the triple jump W85 division of Masters athletics.

Key

Incomplete information Pending Wind aided Better indoor mark

Distance	Wind	Athlete	Nationality	Birthdate	Age	Location	Date
6.62 m	0.0	Christa Bortignon	Canada	29 January 1937	86 years, 208 days	Abbotsford	25 August 2023
6.52 m	0.0	Christa Bortignon	Canada	29 January 1937	86 years, 154 days	Kelowna	2 July 2023
6.35 m	+1.4	Christa Bortignon	Canada	29 January 1937	85 years, 140 days	Prince George	18 June 2022
6.35 m i		Christa Bortignon	Canada	29 January 1937	85 years, 28 days	Kamloops	26 February 2022
6.16 m	+1.3	Christa Bortignon	Canada	29 January 1937	85 years, 98 days	Eugene	7 May 2022
5.50 m	NWI	Ruth Frith	Australia	23 August 1909	83 years, 257 days	Sydney	25 March 1995
5.11 m	+1.3	Masako Hasegawa	Japan	1926	85	Mie	15 May 2011
4.70 m	NWI	Johnnye Valien	United States	24 July 1925	86 years, 56 days	Long Beach	18 September 2011
4.66 m	NWI	Rosaline Sole	New Zealand	21 August 1915	85 years, 320 days	Brisbane	7 July 2001
4.41 m	+0.2	Olga Kotleko	Canada	2 March 1919	88 years, 107 days	Langley	17 June 2007
4.29 m	NWI	Alicia Canal	Colombia	24 October 2018	88 years, 11 days	Rio de Janeiro	4 November 2006
