= Masters W80 long jump world record progression =

This is the progression of world record improvements of the long jump W80 division of Masters athletics.

Key

Incomplete information Pending Better indoor mark

Distance	Wind	Athlete	Nationality	Birthdate	Age	Location	Date
3.69	+0.9	Carol LaFayette-Boyd	Canada	17 May 1942	80 years, 74 days	Regina	30 July 2022
3.49 i		Rietje Dijkman	Netherlands	21 June 1939	82 years, 245 days	Braga	21 February 2022
3.45	-1.9	Rietje Dijkman	Netherlands	21 June 1939	80 years, 80 days	Jesolo	9 September 2019
3.28 i		Christa Bortignon	Canada	29 January 1937	82 years, 56 days	Toruń	26 March 2019
3.45	+1.6	Christiane Schmalbruch	Germany	8 January 1937	80 years, 153 days	Rostock	10 June 2017
3.28 i		Christa Bortignon	Canada	29 January 1937	80 years, 63 days	Kamloops	2 April 2017
3.16	0.0	Rosemarie Kreiskott	Germany	14 March 1931	80 years, 96 days	Edenkoben	18 June 2011
3.05	-0.4	Christa Happ	Germany	25 December 1929	80 years, 189 days	Kevelaer	2 July 2010
2.96	+0.6	Rosa Pedersen	Denmark	25 February 1930	80 years, 115 days	Haderslev	20 June 2010
2.90		Johanna Gelbrich	Germany	19 January 1913	80 years, 186 days	Duisburg	24 July 1993
2.40		Ruth Frith	Australia	23 August 1909	80 years, 233 days	Melbourne	13 April 1990
