= Masters W70 long jump world record progression =

This is the progression of world record improvements of the long jump W70 division of Masters athletics.

Key

Incomplete information Pending

Distance	Wind	Athlete	Nationality	Birthdate	Location	Date
4.26	1.9	Carol LaFayette-Boyd	Canada	17.05.1942	Saint John	09.08.2012
4.24		Paula Schneiderhan	Germany	16.11.1921	Aalen	26.09.1992
4.15	0.3	Paula Schneiderhan	Germany	16.11.1921	Athens	06.06.1994
3.55		Mary Wixey	United Kingdom	23.01.1921	Birmingham	06.07.1991
3.48		Mary Bowermaster	United States	26.07.1917	Eugene	10.08.1987
