= Caroline Powell (athlete) =

British sprinter

Personal information
- National team: Great Britain
- Born: 21 December 1953 (age 72)

Sport
- Sport: Athletics
Medal record
Athletics
Representing Great Britain
World Masters Athletics Championships (W55)
Gold medal – first place	2009 Lahti	400m
Gold medal – first place	2011 Sacramento	400m
Silver medal – second place	2011 Sacramento	200m
Bronze medal – third place	2011 Sacramento	100m
Bronze medal – third place	2013 Porto Alegre	100m
World Masters Athletics Championships (W60)
Gold medal – first place	2015 Lyon	400m
Silver medal – second place	2015 Lyon	100m
Silver medal – second place	2015 Lyon	200m
Silver medal – second place	2018 Malaga	200m
World Masters Athletics Indoor Championships (W50)
Gold medal – first place	2008 Clermont-Ferrand	400m
Bronze medal – third place	2008 Clermont-Ferrand	200m
World Masters Athletics Indoor Championships (W55)
Gold medal – first place	2012 Jyvaskyla	400m
Silver medal – second place	2012 Jyvaskyla	100m
Silver medal – second place	2012 Jyvaskyla	200m
World Masters Athletics Indoor Championships (W60)
Gold medal – first place	2014 Budapest	400m
Silver medal – second place	2014 Budapest	60m
Silver medal – second place	2014 Budapest	200m
European Masters Athletics Championships (W50)
Gold medal – first place	2008 Ljubljana	400m
European Masters Athletics Championships (W55)
Gold medal – first place	2010 Nyireghaza	200m
Gold medal – first place	2010 Nyireghaza	400m
Silver medal – second place	2010 Nyireghaza	100m
Gold medal – first place	2012 Zittau	200m
Gold medal – first place	2012 Zittau	400m
Silver medal – second place	2012 Zittau	100m
European Masters Indoor Athletics Championships (W55)
Gold medal – first place	2011 Gent	200m
Gold medal – first place	2011 Gent	400m
Gold medal – first place	2013 San Sebastian	200m
Gold medal – first place	2013 San Sebastian	400m
Silver medal – second place	2013 San Sebastian	60m
European Masters Indoor Athletics Championships (W60)
Gold medal – first place	2015 Torun	200m
Gold medal – first place	2015 Torun	400m
Bronze medal – third place	2015 Torun	60m
Gold medal – first place	2016 Ancona	60m
Gold medal – first place	2016 Ancona	200m
Gold medal – first place	2016 Ancona	400m
- Updated on 16 April 2016

Caroline Ann Powell (born 21 December 1953) is a track and field sprint athlete who competes as a Masters athlete for Great Britain. She is the current World record holder in the W60 400 metres. She also hold the world record as a member of relay teams in the W50 4×100 metres, the W50 and W60 4×400 metres. She also holds the world indoor records in the W50, W55 and W60 divisions of the 400 metres and as a member of the W60 4×200 metres relay team. She runs for the Bristol and West Athletic Club.

== Personal bests ==
Event	Personal Best
60m	8.63i
100m	13.70
200m	27.70
400m	59.87
800m	2:29.40
