= Masters W80 javelin world record progression =

Masters W80 javelin world record progression is the progression of world record improvements of the javelin throw W80 division of Masters athletics. Records must be set in properly conducted, official competitions under the standing IAAF rules unless modified by World Masters Athletics. The W80 division consists of female athletes who have reached the age of 80 but have not yet reached the age of 85, so exactly from their 80th birthday to the day before their 85th birthday. The W80 division throws a 400 g implement.

Key

Incomplete information Pending

Distance	Athlete	Nationality	Birthdate	Location	Date
27.51	Evaun B. Williams	Great Britain	19 December 1937	Toruń	27 March 2019
26.06	Evaun B. Williams	Great Britain	19 December 1937	Málaga	16 September 2018
24.65	Evaun B. Williams	Great Britain	19 December 1937	Málaga	14 September 2018
22.85	Evaun B. Williams	Great Britain	19 December 1937	Stevenage	11 June 2018
21.83	Rachel Hanssens	Belgium	6 April 1929	Nyíregyháza	15 July 2010
20.01	Olga Kotelko	Canada	2 March 1919	Nanaimo	5 August 2000
19.86	Johanna Gelbrich	Germany	19 January 1913	Miyazaki	9 October 1993
17.86	Irja Sarnama	Finland	27 September 1905		16 August 1986
