= Masters W65 300 metres hurdles world record progression =

This is the progression of world record improvements of the 300 metres hurdles W65 division of Masters athletics.

Key

Incomplete information Pending

| Hand | Auto | Athlete | Nationality | Birthdate | Age | Location | Date | Ref |
|---|---|---|---|---|---|---|---|---|
| | 52.41 | Jane Horder | Great Britain | 18 January 1957 | 66 years, 247 days | Pescara | 22 September 2023 | |
| | 52.33 (Note: not ratified due to wrong hurdles height) | Jane Horder | Great Britain | 18 January 1957 | 65 years, 168 days | Tampere | 5 July 2022 | |
| | 52.70 | Jane Horder | Great Britain | 18 January 1957 | 65 years, 144 days | Derby | 11 June 2022 | |
| | 53.42 | Jane Horder | Great Britain | 18 January 1957 | 65 years, 137 days | Nuneaton | 4 June 2022 | |
| | 54.00 | Karla Del Grande | Canada | 27 March 1953 | 68 years, 141 days | Toronto | 15 August 2021 | |
| | 54.06 | Marge Allison | Australia | 13 September 1944 | 66 years, 296 days | Sacramento | 6 July 2011 | |
| | 55.30 | Oddbjørg Haakensveen | Norway | 29 April 1945 | 65 years, 77 days | Nyíregyháza | 15 July 2010 | |
| | 55.69 | Rietje Dijkman | Netherlands | 21 June 1939 | 66 years, 35 days | Edmonton | 26 July 2005 | |
| | 1:01.36 | Renate Schaden | Austria | 17 February 1939 | 65 years, 159 days | Arhus | 25 July 2004 | |
| | 1:01.79 | Leili Kaas | Estonia | 1 October 1934 | 68 | | 2003 | |
| | 1:02.45 | Betty Vosburgh | United States | 1931 | 66 | San Jose | 9 August 1997 | |
| | 1:05.67 | Isabel Hofmeyr | South Africa | 4 June 1928 | 65 years, 131 days | Miyazaki | 13 October 1993 | |
| | 1:08.23 | Else Laine | Finland | | 65 | Turku | July 1991 | |
