= Masters W40 triple jump world record progression =

This is the progression of world record improvements of the triple jump W40 division of Masters athletics.

Key

Incomplete information Pending Wind aided

Distance	Wind	Athlete	Nationality	Birthdate	Location	Date
14.06	+1.5	Yamilé Aldama	United Kingdom	14.08.1972	Eugene	01.06.2013
13.95i		Yamilé Aldama	United Kingdom	14.08.1972	Gothenburg	03.03.2013
13.91i		Yamilé Aldama	United Kingdom	14.08.1972	Gothenburg	03.03.2013
13.55		Tatyana Ter-Mesrobyan	Russia	12.05.1968	Saint Petersburg	08.07.2009
13.14	2.5	Katalin Deák	Hungary	04.03.1968	Budapest	14.06.2009
13.05	0.6	Katalin Deák	Hungary	04.03.1968	Budapest	14.06.2009
13.01 i		Svetlana Klimina	Uzbekistan	27.04.1966	Tashkent	29.01.2008
12.49		Dagmar Urbánková	Czech Republic	08.04.1962	Turnov	19.05.2002
12.48	0.5	Conceição Geremías	Brazil	23.07.1956	Durban	23.07.1997
12.28		Anna Włodarczyk	Poland	24.03.1951	Irvine	23.05.1992
12.07	0.2	Anna Włodarczyk	Poland	24.03.1951	Turku	27.07.1991
11.89		Danielle Desmier	France	27.07.1949	Niort	20.05.1991
11.35		Phil Raschker	United States	21.02.1947	Eugene	01.08.1989
