= Masters W60 high jump world record progression =

This is the progression of world record improvements of the high jump W60 division of Masters athletics. Also see Masters women high jump world record progression.

Key

Incomplete information Pending

Height	Athlete	Nationality	Birthdate	Location	Date
1.48	Viebahn Frauke	Germany	26.11.1959	Stendal	28.05.2022
1.47	Weia Reinboud	Netherlands	11.03.1950	Naaldwijk	19.09.2010
1.45	Weia Reinboud	Netherlands	11.03.1950	Hoorn	06.06.2010
1.44	Phil Raschker	United States	21.02.1947	Hoover	08.06.2007
1.41	Edith Graff	Belgium	09.11.1941	Arhus	25.07.2004
1.39	Erika Springmann	Germany	13.02.1943	Carolina	05.07.2003
1.39	Edith Graff	Belgium	09.11.1941	Carolina	05.07.2003
1.39	Ursula Stelling	Germany	23.05.1941	Weinstadt	27.07.2002
1.38	Christiane Schmalbruch	Germany	08.01.1937	Schweinfurt	15.08.1997
1.30	Rosemary Chrimes	United Kingdom	19.05.1933	Birmingham	26.09.1993
1.27	Elsa Enarsson	Sweden	30.08.1930	Turku	23.07.1991
1.25 i	Leonore McDaniels	United States	06.03.1928	Boston	24.03.1991
