= Masters M80 pole vault world record progression =

This is the progression of world record improvements of the pole vault M80 division of Masters athletics.

Key

Incomplete information Pending

Height	Athlete	Nationality	Birthdate	Age	Location	Date	Ref
2.80 m i (Note: Competition at USATF Masters Outdoor Championships moved indoors)	Arthur Parry	United States	4 April 1946	80 years, 106 days	Geneva	19 July 2026	
2.77 m i A	Don Isett	United States	16 May 1939	80 years, 246 days	Reno	17 January 2020	
2.75 m	Franklin "Bud" Held	United States	25 October 1927	80 years, 345 days	Santa Barbara	4 October 2008	
2.75 m i	William Bell	United States	19 March 1922	80 years, 3 days	Boston	22 March 2002	
2.51	Carol Johnston	United States	24.12.1911	Eagle Rock	20.06.1992		
2.32	Ahti Pajunen	Finland	03.12.1909	Turku	20.07.1991		
