= Masters W60 400 metres world record progression =

This is the progression of world record improvements of the 400 metres W60 division of Masters athletics.

Key

Incomplete information Pending

Hand	Auto	Athlete	Nationality	Birthdate	Age	Location	Date	Ref
	1:01.73	Sue McDonald	United States	29 March 1963	61 years, 112 days	Sacramento	19 July 2024	
	1:02.34	Sue McDonald	United States	29 March 1963	60 years, 114 days	Greensboro	21 July 2023	
	1:03.71	Sue McDonald	United States	29 March 1963	60 years, 17 days	Long Beach	15 April 2023	
	1:04.31	Caroline Powell	Great Britain	21 December 1953	61 years, 234 days	Lyon	12 August 2015	
	1:04.64	Caroline Powell	Great Britain	21 December 1953	60 years, 193 days	Cheltenham	2 July 2014	
	1:06.24	Karla Del Grande	Canada	27 March 1953	60 years, 213 days	Porto Alegre	26 October 2013	
	1:06.69	Phil Raschker	United States	21 February 1947	60 years, 132 days	Louisville	3 July 2007	
	1:07.30	Anne Stobaus	Australia	6 July 1941	60 years, 4 days	Brisbane	10 July 2001	
	1:07.80	Irene Obera	United States	7 December 1933	61 years, 227 days	Buffalo	22 July 1995	
	1:07.97	Ann Cooper	Australia	7 December 1928	62 years, 223 days	Turku	18 July 1991	
	1:12.24	Paula Schneiderhan	Germany	16 November 1921	63 years, 219 days	Rome	23 June 1985	
1:12.5		Aileen Hogan	Australia	23 October 1922	60 years, 328 days	Houston	16 September 1983	
