= Masters W85 javelin world record progression =

Masters W85 javelin world record progression is the progression of world record improvements of the javelin throw W85 division of Masters athletics. Records must be set in properly conducted, official competitions under the standing IAAF rules unless modified by World Masters Athletics. The W85 division consists of female athletes who have reached the age of 85 but have not yet reached the age of 90, so exactly from their 85th birthday to the day before their 90th birthday. The W85 division throws a 400 g implement.

Key

Incomplete information Pending

Distance	Athlete	Nationality	Birthdate	Age	Location	Date	Ref
24.78 m	Evaun B. Williams	Great Britain	19 December 1937	86 years, 244 days	Gothenburg	19 August 2024	
24.24 m	Evaun B. Williams	Great Britain	19 December 1937	85 years, 276 days	Pescara	21 September 2023	
19.18 m	Elsbeth Padia	United States	5 July 1938	85 years, 6 days	Pittsburgh	11 July 2023	
18.96 m	Rachel Hanssens	Belgium	6 April 1929	85 years, 70 days	Lebbeke	15 June 2014	
18.56 m	Olga Kotelko	Canada	2 March 1919	85 years, 112 days	Eugene	22 June 2004	
13.74 m	Irja Sarnama	Finland	27 September 1905	85 years, 296 days	Turku	20 July 1991	
