= Masters W75 80 metres hurdles world record progression =

This is the progression of world record improvements of the 80 metres hurdles W75 division of Masters athletics.

Key

Incomplete information Wind aided Pending

Hand	Auto	Wind	Athlete	Nationality	Birthdate	Age	Location	Date	Ref
	17.24	(+0.5 m/s)	Riet Jonkers-Slegers	Netherlands	4 October 1943	75 years, 296 days	Dilbeek	27 July 2019	
	17.37	(−0.7 m/s)	Marianne Maier	Austria	25 December 1942	75 years, 264 days	Málaga	15 September 2018	
	17.44	(+0.6 m/s)	Christa Bortignon	Canada	29 January 1937	76 years, 204 days	Kamloops	21 August 2013	
	17.71	(+1.0 m/s)	Christa Bortignon	Canada	29 January 1937	75 years, 237 days	San Diego	22 September 2012	
	18.63	(±0.0 m/s)	Florence Meiler	United States	1 June 1934	75 years, 38 days	Oshkosh	9 July 2009	
	19.76	(+0.5 m/s)	Asta Larsson	Sweden	23 October 1931	75 years, 316 days	Riccione	4 September 2007	
	20.04	(+0.4 m/s)	Isabel Hofmeyr	South Africa	4 June 1928	75 years, 37 days	Carolina	11 July 2003	
	21.73	NWI	Johnnye Valien	United States	24 July 1925	75 years, 54 days	Chula Vista	16 September 2000	
	27.89	NWI	Rosaline Sole	New Zealand	21 August 1915	75	Turku	July 1991	
