= Masters W80 1500 metres world record progression =

This is the progression of world record improvements of the 1500 metres W80 division of Masters athletics.

Key

Incomplete information Pending

Hand	Auto	Athlete	Nationality	Birthdate	Location	Date
	7:17.96	Melitta Czerwenka Nagel	Germany	30.04.1930	Saarbrücken	30.06.2011
	7:32.22	Johanna Luther	Germany	02.08.1913	Miyazaki	16.10.1993
	8:36.90	Anne Clarke	United States	21.09.1909	Turku	27.07.1991
