= Masters women high jump world record progression =

This is the progression of world record improvements of the high jump of Masters athletics.

Key

Incomplete information Pending Indoor mark
IAAF includes indoor marks in the record list since 2000, but WMA does not follow that practice.

== Women 35 ==
Height	Athlete	Nationality	Birthdate	Location	Date
2.02i	Anna Chicherova	Russia	22.07.1982	Moscow	15.02.2019
2.01i	Anna Chicherova	Russia	22.07.1982	Chelyabinsk	17.01.2019
2.01i	Anna Chicherova	Russia	22.07.1982	Moscow	20.01.2019
2.01	Ruth Beitia	Spain	01.04.1979	Zurich	17.08.2014
2.01	Inga Babakova	Ukraine	27.06.1967	Oslo	27.06.2003
2.00	Inga Babakova	Ukraine	27.06.1967	Seville	07.06.2003
1.98	Inga Babakova	Ukraine	27.06.1967	Athens	28.05.2003
1.96	Inga Babakova	Ukraine	27.06.1967	Thessaloniki	24.07.2002
1.94 i	Yelena Panikarovskikh	Russia	04.12.1959	Banská Bystrica	08.02.1995
1.92	Yelena Panikarovskikh	Russia	04.12.1959	Saint Petersburg	07.06.1996
1.89	Yelena Panikarovskikh	Russia	04.12.1959	Ostrava	01.06.1995
1.88	Cindy Suggs Greiner	United States	15.02.1957	New Orleans	20.06.1992
1.88	Debbie Brill	Canada	10.03.1953	Walnut	24.04.1988
1.82	Jane Frederick	United States	07.04.1952	San Jose	23.06.1987
1.73	Christel Voss	Germany	20.08.1942	Hannover	30.07.1979
1.72	Christel Voss	Germany	20.08.1942		02.08.1978
1.67	Dorothy Tyler	United Kingdom	14.03.1920	London	15.06.1957
1.66	Dorothy Tyler	United Kingdom	14.03.1920	Prague	14.09.1955

== Women 40 ==
Height	Athlete	Nationality	Birthdate	Location	Date
1.94 m i	Venelina Veneva	Bulgaria	13.06.1974	Dobrich; Prague	15.02.2015; 06.03.2015
1.90 m	Venelina Veneva	Bulgaria	13.06.1974	Pitești	26.07.2014
1.90 m	Venelina Veneva	Bulgaria	13.06.1974	Plovdiv	12.07.2014
1.87 m	Iryna Mykhalchenko	Ukraine	20.01.1972	Yalta	13.06.2012
1.90 m	Romary Rifka	Mexico	23.12.1970	Veracruz	05.08.2011
1.78 m	Julia Machin Bennett	United Kingdom	26.03.1970	Milton Keynes	22.05.2010
1.76 m A	Patricia Porter	United States	27.08.1962	Albuquerque	06.06.2004
1.75 m	Patricia Porter	United States	27.08.1962	Eugene	10.08.2003
1.75 m	Debbie Brill	Canada	10.03.1953	Victoria	10.08.1996
1.72 m	Carmen Karg	Germany	19.08.1954	Buffalo	16.07.1995
1.72 m i	Debbie Brill	Canada	10.03.1953	Reno	25.02.1995
1.70 m	Yordanka Blagoeva	Bulgaria	19.01.1947	Verona	25.06.1988
1.66 m	Martina Lobinger	Germany	10.02.1945	Bonn	21.09.1985
1.63 m	Dorothy Tyler	United Kingdom	14.03.1920	London	02.08.1961
1.57 m	Dorothy Tyler	United Kingdom	14.03.1920	Teddington	18.06.1960

== Women 45 ==
Height	Athlete	Nationality	Birthdate	Location	Date
1.76	Debbie Brill	Canada	10 March 1953	Gateshead	6 August 1999
1.75	Debbie Brill	Canada	10 March 1953	Langley	20 June 1998
1.62	Alena Plischke	Austria	29 April 1948	Stuttgart	4 July 1993
1.61	Alena Plischke	Austria	29 April 1948	Innsbruck	20 June 1993
1.57	Alena Plischke	Austria	29 April 1948	Wattens	28 May 1993
1.55	Joanna Meryl Smallwood	United Kingdom	12 November 1943	Eugene	4 August 1989
1.55	Christel Häuser	Germany	12 June 1943	Eugene	4 August 1989
1.52	Dorothy Tyler	United Kingdom	14 March 1920	London	18 July 1965

== Women 50 ==
Height	Athlete	Nationality	Birthdate	Location	Date
1.70	Julia Machin	United Kingdom	26 March 1970	Brighton	20 June 2021
1.68	Julia Machin	United Kingdom	26 March 1970	Bedford	31 May 2021
1.66	Julia Machin	United Kingdom	26 March 1970	Chelmsford	13 September 2020
1.62	Julia Machin	United Kingdom	26 March 1970	Chelmsford	13 September 2020
1.61	Petra Bajeat	France	6 March 1966	Saint-Florentin	30 June 2018
1.60	Debbie Brill	Canada	10 March 1953	Langley	19 June 2004
1.57	Weia Reinboud	Netherlands	11 March 1950	Krommenie	6 August 2000
1.56	Weia Reinboud	Netherlands	11 March 1950	Eindhoven	29 July 2000
1.55	Weia Reinboud	Netherlands	11 March 1950	Haarlem	14 May 2000
1.55	Phil Raschker	United States	21 February 1947	Tucson	25 May 1997
1.54	Phil Raschker	United States	21 February 1947	Atlanta	13 April 1997
1.53 i	Phil Raschker	United States	21 February 1947	Boston	23 March 1997
1.53	Renate Vogel	Germany	26 November 1943	Buffalo	18 July 1995
1.47	Dorothy Tyler	United Kingdom	14 March 1920	Carshalton	14 June 1970

== Women 55 ==
Height	Athlete	Nationality	Birthdate	Age	Location	Date	Ref
1.64 m	Julia Machin	Great Britain	26 March 1970	55 years, 172 days	Derby	14 September 2025	
1.63 m	Julia Machin	Great Britain	26 March 1970	55 years, 143 days	Oxford	16 August 2025	
1.62 m	Julia Machin	Great Britain	26 March 1970	55 years, 122 days	London	26 July 2025	
1.60 m	Julia Machin	Great Britain	26 March 1970	55 years, 66 days	Poole	31 May 2025	
1.58 m	Julia Machin	Great Britain	26 March 1970	55 years, 46 days	Crawley	11 May 2025	
1.55 m i	Wendy Laing	Great Britain	29 December 1962	55 years, 82 days	Madrid	21 March 2018	
1.55 m	Florence Picaut	France	25 October 1952	55 years, 206 days	Versailles	18 May 2008	
1.50 m	Weia Reinboud	Netherlands	11 March 1950	56 years, 113 days	Krommenie	2 July 2006	
1.48 m	Weia Reinboud	Netherlands	11 March 1950	56 years, 91 days	Emmen	10 June 2006	
1.47 m	Phil Raschker	United States	21 February 1947	56 years, 131 days	Carolina	2 July 2003	
1.46 m	Renate Vogel	Germany	26 November 1943	56 years, 229 days	Jyväskylä	12 July 2000	
1.48 m i	Renate Vogel	Germany	26 November 1943	55 years, 100 days	Malmö	6 March 1999	
1.43 m	Taisija Tchentchik	Russia	30 January 1936	55 years, 174 days	Turku	23 July 1991	
1.39 m i	Grethe Bolstad	Norway	2 August 1935	55 years, 206 days	Ekeberg	24 February 1991	
1.37 m	Rosemary Chrimes	Great Britain	19 May 1933	56 years, 51 days	Reading	9 July 1989	
1.36 m	Rosemary Chrimes	Great Britain	19 May 1933	55 years, 37 days	Verona	25 June 1988	
1.35 m	Daphne Pirie	Australia	12 December 1931	55 years, 354 days	Melbourne	1 December 1987	
1.33 m	Olga Oldřichová	Czech Republic	1 June 1928	56 years, 92 days	Stará Boleslav	1 September 1984	
1.30 m	Vlasta Chlumská	Czech Republic	30 March 1923	56 years, 122 days	Hanover	30 July 1979	

== Women 60 ==
Height	Athlete	Nationality	Birthdate	Age	Location	Date	Ref
1.54 m	Barbara Gähling	Germany	20 January 1965	60 years, 129 days	Köln	29 May 2025	
1.48 m	Neringa Jakstiene	United States	18 October 1963	60 years, 301 days	Gothenburg	14 August 2024	
1.48 m	Frauke Viebahn	Germany	26 November 1959	62 years, 183 days	Stendal	28 May 2022	
1.50 m i	Frauke Viebahn	Germany	26 November 1959	60 years, 75 days	Düsseldorf	9 February 2020	
1.47 m	Weia Reinboud	Netherlands	11 March 1950	60 years, 192 days	Naaldwijk	19 September 2010	
1.45 m	Weia Reinboud	Netherlands	11 March 1950	60 years, 87 days	Hoorn	6 June 2010	
1.44 m	Phil Raschker	United States	21 February 1947	60 years, 107 days	Hoover	8 June 2007	
1.41 m	Edith Graff	Belgium	9 November 1941	62 years, 259 days	Arhus	25 July 2004	
1.39 m	Edith Graff	Belgium	9 November 1941	61 years, 238 days	Carolina	5 July 2003	
1.39 m	Erika Springmann	Germany	13 February 1943	60 years, 142 days	Carolina	5 July 2003	
1.39 m	Ursula Stelling	Germany	23 May 1941	61 years, 65 days	Weinstadt	27 July 2002	
1.38 m	Christiane Schmalbruch	Germany	8 January 1937	60 years, 219 days	Schweinfurt	15 August 1997	
1.36 m	Christiane Schmalbruch	Germany	8 January 1937	60 years, 199 days	Durban	26 July 1997	
1.30 m	Rosemary Chrimes	Great Britain	19 May 1933	60 years, 130 days	Birmingham	26 September 1993	
1.28 m	Rosemary Chrimes	Great Britain	19 May 1933	60 years, 18 days	Solihull	6 June 1993	
1.27 m	Elsa Enarsson	Sweden	30 August 1930	60 years, 327 days	Turku	23 July 1991	
1.26 m	Olga Oldřichová	Czechoslovakia	1 June 1928	62 years, 92 days	Brno	1 September 1990	
1.25 m	Christiane Wippersteg	Germany	25 December 1937	50 years, 183 days	Verona	25 June 1988	
1.25 m	Kirsten Hveem	Norway	26.03.1925	Rome	22.06.1985		
1.19 m	Bettina Woodburn	Australia	06.12.1923	Melbourne	23.03.1985		
1.17 m	Heather May	New Zealand	04.08.1922	Houston	17.09.1983		
1.16 m	Maria Van As	South Africa	20 September 1920		2 May 1981		
1.15 m	Annchen Reile	Germany	21 July 1915	Viareggio	15 September 1978		

== Women 65 ==
Height	Athlete	Nationality	Birthdate	Age	Location	Date	Ref
1.44 m i	Frauke Viebahn	Germany	26 November 1959	66 years, 101 days	Düsseldorf	7 March 2026	
1.43 m i	Frauke Viebahn	Germany	26 November 1959	65 years, 97 days	Frankfurt	3 March 2025	
1.42 m	Weia Reinboud	Netherlands	11 March 1950	65 years, 102 days	Den Helder	21 June 2015	
1.40 m	Weia Reinboud	Netherlands	11 March 1950	65 years, 80 days	Stendal	30 May 2015	
1.38 m	Weia Reinboud	Netherlands	11 March 1950	65 years, 58 days	Utrecht	8 May 2015	
1.37 m	Ursula Stelling	Germany	23 May 1941	65 years, 61 days	Poznań	23 July 2006	
1.35	Kathy Bergen	United States	24.12.1939		Long Beach	20.05.2006	
1.34	Rietje Dijkman	Netherlands	21.06.1939		Aarhus	28.07.2004	
1.34	Evelyn Wright	United States	17.03.1937		Las Vegas	04.10.2003	
1.32	Evelyn Wright	United States	17.03.1937		Las Vegas	03.09.2003	
1.30	Evelyn Wright	United States	17.03.1937		Norfolk	30.05.2003	
1.28 i	Evelyn Wright	United States	17.03.1937		Boston	28.03.2003	
1.28	Christiane Schmalbruch	Germany	08.01.1937		Potsdam	21.08.2002	
1.27 A	Leonore McDaniels	United States	06.03.1928		Provo	11.08.1993	
1.24	Leonore McDaniels	United States	06.03.1928		Baton Rouge	12.06.1993	
1.23 i	Leonore McDaniels	United States	06.03.1928		Bozeman	21.03.1993	
1.22	Gwen Davidson	Australia	28.11.1922		Melbourne	01.12.1987	
1.14	Mary Bowermaster	United States	26.07.1917		Indianapolis	08.06.1985	
1.14 i	Mary Bowermaster	United States	26.07.1917		Sterling	30.03.1985	
1.12	Mary Bowermaster	United States	26.07.1917		Eugene	17.08.1984	
1.11	Annchen Reile	Germany	21.07.1915		Christchurch	12.01.1981	
1.10	Annchen Reile	Germany	21.07.1915		Helsinki	06.08.1980	

== Women 70 ==
Height	Athlete	Nationality	Birthdate	Location	Date
1.34	Weia Reinboud	Netherlands	11 March 1950	Hengelo	18 September 2021
1.33	Weia Reinboud	Netherlands	11 March 1950	Utrecht	6 August 2021
1.32	Weia Reinboud	Netherlands	11 March 1950	Utrecht	16 July 2021
1.32	Weia Reinboud	Netherlands	11 March 1950	Alkmaar	6 September 2020
1.31	Weia Reinboud	Netherlands	11 March 1950	Hilversum	23 August 2020
1.30	Weia Reinboud	Netherlands	11 March 1950	Gouda	24 July 2020
1.30 i	Ursula Stelling	Germany	23 May 1941	Erfurt	3 March 2012
1.30	Kathy Bergen	United States	24 December 1939	Sacramento	24 July 2010
1.29 i	Kathy Bergen	United States	24 December 1939	Colorado Springs	14 February 2010
1.27	Christiane Schmalbruch	Germany	8 January 1937	Fulda	15 July 2007
1.26	Rosemary Chrimes	United Kingdom	19 May 1933	Carolina	5 July 2003
1.23	Rosemary Chrimes	United Kingdom	19 May 1933	Derby	7 June 2003
1.22	Christa Happ	Germany	25 December 1929	Celle	10 September 2000
1.22	Leonore McDaniels	United States	6 March 1928	Raleigh	9 May 1998
1.19 i	Leonore McDaniels	United States	6 March 1928	Lexington	7 March 1998
1.16	Helgi Pedel	Canada	21 January 1924	Toronto	31 May 1997
1.16 i	Helgi Pedel	Canada	21 January 1924	Toronto	5 March 1994
1.16	Gwen Davidson	Australia	28 November 1922	Adelaide	10 April 1993
1.13	Mary Bowermaster	United States	26 July 1917	Melbourne	5 December 1987
1.07	Mary Bowermaster	United States	26 July 1917	Eugene	14 August 1987
1.05	Shiela Evans	United States	24 April 1915	Indianapolis	23 August 1985
1.01	Vivian Nelson	United States	9 September 1912	Eugene	17 August 1984

== Women 75 ==
Height	Athlete	Nationality	Birthdate	Age	Location	Date	Ref
1.28 m	Weia Reinboud	Netherlands	11 March 1950	75 years, 75 days	Oosterhout	25 May 2025	
1.27 m	Weia Reinboud	Netherlands	11 March 1950	75 years, 66 days	Utrecht	16 May 2025	
1.26 m	Weia Reinboud	Netherlands	11 March 1950	75 years, 52 days	Utrecht	2 May 2025	
1.25 m A i	Kathy Bergen	United States	24 December 1939	76 years, 72 days	Albuquerque	5 March 2016	
1.24 m	Carol LaFayette-Boyd	Canada	17 May 1942	76 years, 116 days	Málaga	10 September 2018	
1.24 m i	Rietje Dijkman	Netherlands	21 June 1939	76 years, 237 days	Apeldoorn	13 February 2016	
1.23 m	Carol LaFayette-Boyd	Canada	17 May 1942	75 years, 24 days	Regina	10 June 2027	
1.22 m	Kathy Bergen	United States	24 December 1939	75 years, 164 days	Pasadena	6 June 2015	
1.22 m	Rietje Dijkman	Netherlands	21 June 1939	76 years, 48 days	Lyon	8 August 2015	
1.21 m	Kathy Bergen	United States	24 December 1939	75 years, 150 days	Costa Mesa	23 May 2015	
1.20 m	Rietje Dijkman	Netherlands	21 June 1939	75 years, 1 day	Heiloo	22 June 2014	
1.18 m	Rosemary Chrimes	Great Britain	19.05.1933		Nuneaton	10.06.2012	
1.17 m	Rosemary Chrimes	Great Britain	19.05.1933		Leicester	/13.06.2010	
1.16 m i	Rosemary Chrimes	Great Britain	19.05.1933		Lee Valley	27.03.2010	
1.16 m	Christa Happ	Germany	25.12.1929		Vaterstetten	16.07.2005	
1.15 m i	Christa Happ	Germany	25.12.1929		Eskilstuna	11.03.2005	
1.15 m	Leonore McDaniels	United States	06.03.1928		Sacramento	03.08.2003	
1.15 m	Leonore McDaniels	United States	06.03.1928		Carolina	05.07.2003	
1.13 m	Leonore McDaniels	United States	06.03.1928		Norfolk	30.05.2003	
1.13 m	Leonore McDaniels	United States	06.03.1928		Raleigh	03.05.2003	
1.12 m	Gwen Davidson	Australia	28.11.1922		Adelaide	01.09.1999	
1.11 m	Helgi Pedel	Canada	21.01.1924		Toronto	12.06.1999	
1.10 m i	Margaret Hinton	United States	14.08.1921		Boston	26.03.1999	
1.08 m	Bertha Hielscher	Germany	17.11.1908		Rome	24.06.1985	

== Women 80 ==
Height	Athlete	Nationality	Birthdate	Location	Date
1.18	Rietje Dijkman	Netherlands	21 June 1939	Hilversum	31 October 2021
1.16	Rietje Dijkman	Netherlands	21 June 1939	Hengelo	18 September 2021
1.15	Kathy Bergen	United States	24 December 1939	Marble Falls	2 October 2020
1.15	Kathy Bergen	United States	24 December 1939	Los Angeles	26 July 2020
1.20 i	Kathy Bergen	United States	24 December 1939	Houston	16 February 2020
1.10	Rosemary Chrimes	United Kingdom	19 May 1933	Porto Alegre	21 October 2013
1.07	Rosemary Chrimes	United Kingdom	19 May 1933	Birmingham	14 September 2013
1.06	Christa Happ	Germany	25 December 1929	Nyíregyháza	18 July 2010
1.05	Christa Happ	Germany	25 December 1929	Hamburg	6 June 2010
1.08 i	Christa Happ	Germany	25 December 1929	Magdeburg	29 January 2010
1.04	Helgi Pedel	Canada	21 January 1924	Toronto	19 June 2004
1.00	Olga Kotelko	Canada	2 March 1919	Saint George	10 October 2000
0.94	Mary Bowermaster	United States	26 July 1917	Orlando	19 October 1999
0.93	Mary Bowermaster	United States	26 July 1917	Orlando	28 August 1999
0.93	Margareta Thesleff Sarvana	Finland	30 August 1908	Espoo	21 July 1990

== Women 85 ==
Height	Athlete	Nationality	Birthdate	Age	Location	Date	Ref
1.05 m	Kathy Bergen	United States	24 December 1939	85 years, 165 days	Moorpark	7 June 2025	
1.02 m	Kathy Bergen	United States	24 December 1939	85 years, 131 days	Moorpark	4 May 2025	
0.95 m	Christa Bortignon	Canada	29 January 1937	85 years, 210 days	Surrey	27 August 2022	
0.95 m	Rosa Pedersen	Denmark	25 February 1930	85 years, 164 days	Lyon	8 August 2015	
0.94 m	Olga Kotelko	Canada	2 March 1919	85 years, 179 days	Dorado	28 August 2004	
0.89 m	Olga Kotelko	Canada	2 March 1919	85 years, 116 days	Eugene	26 June 2004	
0.89 m i	Olga Kotelko	Canada	2 March 1919	85 years, 12 days	Sindelfingen	14 March 2004	
0.80 m i	Margareta Thesleff Sarvana	Finland	30 August 1908	85 years, 149 days	Tampere	26 January 1994	

== Women 90 ==
Height	Athlete	Nationality	Birthdate	Age	Location	Date	Ref
0.92 (Note: record set during decathlon competition)	Florence Meiler	United States	7 June 1934	90 years, 15 days	Charlottesville	22 June 2024	
0.88	Rosa Pedersen	Denmark	25 February 1930	92 years, 102 days	Odense	7 June 2022	
0.87	Rosa Pedersen	Denmark	25 February 1930	92 years, 80 days	Vejle	16 May 2022	
0.86	Rosa Pedersen	Denmark	25 February 1930	91 years, 191 days	Greve	4 September 2021	
0.85	Rosa Pedersen	Denmark	25 February 1930	91 years, 103 days	Odense	8 June 2021	
0.87	Rosa Pedersen	Denmark	25 February 1930	90 years, 119 days	Odense	23 June 2020	
0.86	Rosa Pedersen	Denmark	25 February 1930	90 years, 119 days	Odense	23 June 2020	
0.86	Margaret Hinton	United States	14 August 1921	90 years, 69 days	Houston	22 October 2011	
0.82	Olga Kotelko	Canada	2 March 1919	90 years, 152 days	Lahti	1 August 2009	
0.75	Olga Kotelko	Canada	2 March 1919	90	Nanaimo	May 2009	

== Women 95 ==
Height	Athlete	Nationality	Birthdate	Age	Location	Date
0.75	Olga Kotelko	Canada	2 March 1919	95 years, 77 days	Kamloops	18 May 2014
0.78 i	Olga Kotelko	Canada	2 March 1919	95 years, 24 days	Budapest	26 March 2014
