= Masters W75 10000 metres world record progression =

This is the progression of world record improvements of the 10000 metres W75 division of Masters athletics.

Key

Incomplete information Pending

| Hand | Auto | Athlete | Nationality | Birthdate | Age | Location | Date | Ref |
|---|---|---|---|---|---|---|---|---|
| | 45:59.81 | Sarah Roberts | Great Britain | 6 October 1949 | 75 years, 230 days | Horspath | 24 May 2025 | |
| | 46:53.07 | Jeannie Rice | United States | 14 April 1948 | 75 years, 99 days | Greensboro | 22 July 2023 | |
| | 50:00.93 | Melitta Czerwenka Nagel | Germany | 30 April 1930 | 75 years, 120 days | San Sebastián | 28 August 2005 | |
| | 52:08.73 | Nina Naumenko | Russia | 15 June 1925 | 75 years, 23 days | Jyväskylä | 8 July 2000 | |
| | 53:13.63 | Johanna Luther | Germany | 2 August 1913 | 77 years, 353 days | Turku | 21 July 1991 | |
