= Masters M65 triple jump world record progression =

This is the progression of world record improvements of the triple jump M65 division of Masters athletics.

Key

Incomplete information Pending Indoor mark before 2000, not acceptable for record

Distance	Wind	Athlete	Nationality	Birthdate	Location	Date
11.94	2.0	Hermann Strauss	Germany	06.03.1931	Leinfelden	18.08.1996
11.24		Ariel Standen Levis	Chile	12.09.1929		1994
11.11	0.8	Matti Järvinen	Finland	23.02.1926	Turku	27.07.1991
11.10		Amelio Compri	Italy	31.01.1925	Verona	03.06.1990
10.95 i		Jakob Rypdal	Norway	19.02.1936	Ekeberg	24.02.1991
10.95	1.8	Vaclav Bartl	Sweden	05.03.1926	Glostrup	30.06.1991
10.86 i		Tom Patsalis	United States	06.12.1931	Madison	29.03.1987
