= Masters M70 long jump world record progression =

This is the progression of world record improvements of the long jump M70 division of Masters athletics.

Key

Incomplete information Pending Indoor mark
IAAF includes indoor marks in the record list since 2000, but WMA does not follow that practice.

Distance	Wind	Athlete	Nationality	Birthdate	Location	Date
5.22 i		Vladimir Popov	Russia	08.07.1932	Moscow	20.03.2004
5.19	-0.8	Melvin Larsen	United States	12.06.1924	Eugene	12.08.1994
4.98	-1.5	Gudmund Skrivervik	Norway	18.04.1921	Turku	25.07.1991
4.96		Mazumi Morita	Japan	17.07.1913		15.10.1983
4.83		Heikki Simola	Finland	16.01.1912	Strasbourg	00.07.1982
