= Masters M70 800 metres world record progression =

This is the progression of world record improvements of the 800 metres M70 division of Masters athletics.

Key

Incomplete information Pending better indoor records

Hand	Auto	Athlete	Nationality	Birthdate	Location	Date
	2:20.45 i	Earl Fee	Canada	22.03.1929	Boston	28.03.1999
	2:20.52	Earl Fee	Canada	22.03.1929	Hamilton	17.06.1999
	2:27.57	James Lytjen	United States	1921	Turku	23.07.1991
2:34.5		Monty Montgomery	United States	14.07.1906		04.09.1977
	2:37.51	Harold Chapson	United States	11.07.1902	Gresham	02.07.1976
