= Mary Wixey =

Mary M. Wixey (23 January 1921 – 21 December 2017) was a British track and field athlete based in Cheltenham, Gloucestershire, England. At the time of her death, she was one of Great Britain's oldest Veteran Track and Field Athletes, and regularly competed on the veterans' circuit.

== Career ==
Wixey taught at Churchdown Primary School, and then was a secondary school physical education teacher at Charlton Kings Secondary.

She was a member of St Gregory's Athletic Club, and later was a committee member and team manager for the Gloucestershire Schools Athletics Association. She has competed in Veteran Track and Field Athletics for South-West Veterans' Athletics Club both nationally and internationally since before 1986, at that time as a Veteran 60.

In 1996 she could jump further in both the long jump and the triple jump than anyone in the world of her age, and won European Masters gold medals in triple jump and long jump. In 1997 she was named best senior sportswoman in the United Kingdom by the London Mirror.

In 2007, aged 85, she took part in triple jump, and was still high jumping at the age of 75. In 2008, she competed in shot put at the Tipton Games. In 2010, she held regional titles in discus, shot put and javelin.

As of 2012, at the age of 91, Wixey continued to compete regularly at Veteran 90 level, alongside track and field athletes of all ages at Open Meetings in England and with Veteran athletes at British National, European and World Masters Championships. In April 2012, Wixey travelled to Jyvaskyla, Finland where she competed in the World Masters Athletics Championships, achieving silver medals in five events: 60m sprint, discus, shot put, javelin and long jump. A week later she attended the Tipton Harriers Open Meeting, competing in the long jump, shot put and discus events. In May 2012 she was an Olympic torch bearer for the Cheltenham area.

Wixey died at the age of 96 in December 2017.
