= 2012 European Masters Athletics Championships =

- Dates: 16–25 August 2012
- Host city: Zittau, Germany; Zgorzelec, Poland; Hrádek nad Nisou, Czech Republic
- Venue: Weinau Stadium
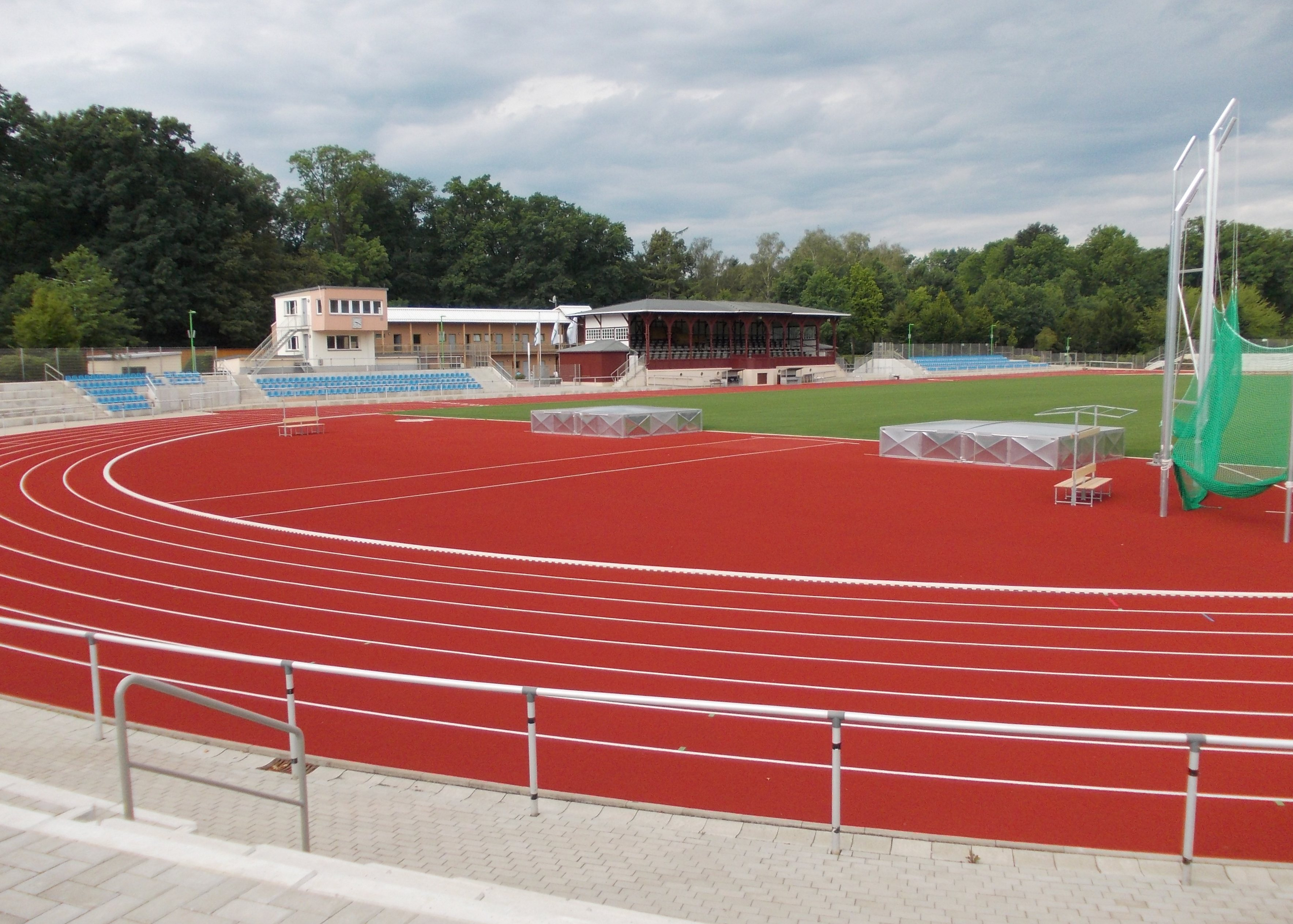
- Level: Masters
- Type: Stadia
- Participation: 3,837 athletes from 38 nations

The eighteenth European Masters Athletics Championships were held in Zittau, Germany, Zgorzelec, Poland and Hrádek nad Nisou, Czech Republic, from 16 to 25 August 2012. The European Masters Athletics Championships serve the division of the sport of athletics for people over 35 years of age, referred to as masters athletics.

The championships were held in three locations near the German/Czech/Polish border.

Less countries participated compared with the last championships in Nyiregyhaza, but just over 700 more athletes participated, giving it the third greatest attendance of any championship run by European Masters Athletics ever.
