= Masters W65 javelin 500g world record progression =

Masters W65 javelin world record progression is the progression of world record improvements of the javelin throw W65 division of Masters athletics. Records must be set in properly conducted, official competitions under the standing IAAF rules unless modified by World Masters Athletics. The W65 division consists of female athletes who have reached the age of 65 but have not yet reached the age of 70, so exactly from their 65th birthday to the day before their 70th birthday. Since 2014, the W65 division throws a 500 g implement.

Key

Incomplete information Pending

Distance	Athlete	Nationality	Birthdate	Location	Date
37.32	Linda Cohn	United States	07.12.1952	Cerritos	13.04.2018
33.99	Linda Cohn	United States	07.12.1952	San Diego	09.12.2017
32.52	Weia Reinboud	Netherlands	11.03.1950	Breda	09.10.2016
32.02	Weia Reinboud	Netherlands	11.03.1950	Woerden	25.09.2016
31.79	Weia Reinboud	Netherlands	11.03.1950	Amersfoort	11.06.2016
31.14	Jarmila Klimešová	Czech Republic	05.11.1947	İzmir	26.08.2014
30.79	Jarmila Klimešová	Czech Republic	05.11.1947	Budapest	28.03.2014
