= Masters M75 80 metres hurdles world record progression =

This is the progression of world record improvements of the 80 metres hurdles M75 division of Masters athletics.

Key

Incomplete information Wind aided Pending

Hand	Auto	Wind	Athlete	Nationality	Birthdate	Location	Date
	13.62		James Stookey	United States	20.01.1930	McLean	04.09.2005
	13.77	1.7	James Stookey	United States	20.01.1930	Eugene	18.06.2005
	13.68	0.2	Melvin Larsen	United States	12.06.1924	Orlando	29.08.1999
	14.13		Albertus Van Zyl	South Africa	13.08.1922	Bloemfontein	10.10.1998
	14.74		Tanaka Juji	Japan	18.04.1923	Wakayama	1998
	14.84	-0.1	Reino Taskinen	Finland	18.01.1916	Athens	12.06.1994
15.1			Frank Finger	United States	16.04.1915		01.09.1990
	15.37	-1.0	Herbert Miller	United States	1916	Turku	1991
	15.40		Robert Reckwardt	Germany	01.04.1913	Verona	28.06.1988
