= Masters W80 400 metres world record progression =

This is the progression of world record improvements of the 400 metres W80 division of Masters athletics.

Key

Incomplete information Pending better indoor records

Hand	Auto	Athlete	Nationality	Birthdate	Age	Location	Date	Ref
	1:28.63	Marjorie Allison	Australia	13 September 1944	80 years, 360 days	Brisbane	8 September 2025	
	1:29.84	Rietje Dijkman	Netherlands	21 June 1939	80 years, 80 days	Caorle	9 September 2019	
	1:31.10 i	Emma Mazzenga	Italy	1 August 1933	80 years, 241 days	Budapest	30 March 2014	
	1:31.21	Emma Mazzenga	Italy	1 August 1933	80 years, 31 days	Padua	1 September 2013	
	1:39.99	Christine Du Plooy	South Africa	25 March 1931	80 years, 35 days	Kings Park	29 April 2011	
	1:40.45	Polly Clarke	United States	17 July 1910	80 years, 17 days	Indianapolis	3 August 1990	
