= Masters M80 discus world record progression =

Masters M80 discus world record progression is the progression of world record improvements of the discus M80 division of Masters athletics. Records must be set in properly conducted, official competitions under the standing IAAF rules unless modified by World Masters Athletics. The M80 division consists of male athletes who have reached the age of 80 but have not yet reached the age of 85, so exactly from their 80th birthday to the day before their 85th birthday. The M80 division throws a 1 kg implement.

Key

Incomplete information Pending

Distance	Athlete	Nationality	Birthdate	Age	Location	Date	Ref
41.13 m	Östen Edlund	Sweden	26 November 1934	81 years, 208 days	Tingstade	21 June 2016	
40.64 m	Östen Edlund	Sweden	26 November 1934	80 years, 199 days	Tingstade	13 June 2015	
40.45 m	Carmelo Rado	Italy	4 August 1933	80 years, 48 days	Montecassiano	21 September 2013	
39.46 m	Carmelo Rado	Italy	4 August 1933	80 years, 35 days	Aosta	8 September 2013	
37.86 m	Osmo Renvall	Finland	10 November 1910	80 years, 255 days	Turku	23 July 1991	
34.52 m	Rudolf Leinen	Germany	7 November 1909	Bad Homburg	18 August 1990		
34.30 m	Karsten Brodersen	Germany	24 June 1907	Melbourne	7 December 1987		
32.40 m	Jacob Schumann	Germany	4 November 1901	Strassbourg	16 July 1982		
