= Masters W50 5000 metres world record progression =

This is the progression of world record improvements of the 5000 metres W50 division of Masters athletics.

Key

Incomplete information Pending

Hand	Auto	Athlete	Nationality	Birthdate	Location	Date
	16:19.51	Monica Joyce	United States	16.07.1958	Walnut	17.04.2009
	16:51.17	Gitte Karlshøj	Denmark	14.05.1959	Arhus	23.06.2009
	17:09.96	Nicole Leveque	France	27.01.1951	Aix les Bains	03.06.2001
	17:17.02	Jutta Pedersen	Sweden	06.12.1946	Enskede-Årsta	27.05.1997
17:25.6		Shirley Maston	United States	07.11.1940		26.09.1991
	18:05.33	Ida Hellwagner	Austria	26.02.1938	Turku	25.07.1991
18:14.9		Valborg Ostberg	Norway	14.05.1931	Larvik	08.08.1981
4:54.5		Anne McKenzie	South Africa	28.07.1925	Greater Point	15.10.1975
