= Masters W55 80 metres hurdles world record progression =

Progression of world record of 80 metres hurdles W55 division of Masters athletics

This is the progression of world record improvements of the 80 metres hurdles W55 division of Masters athletics.

Key

Incomplete information Wind aided Pending

Hand	Auto	Wind	Athlete	Nationality	Birthdate	Location	Date
	12.31	0.8	Helgi Lamp	Estonia	17.06.1944	Haapsalu	17.07.1999
	13.30	1.2	Corrie Roovers	Netherlands	14.07.1935	Turku	21.07.1991
	14.20		Wanda Dos Santos	Brazil	01.06.1932	São Paulo	1988
	14.25	-2.0	Asta Larsson	Sweden	23.10.1931	Lund	03.06.1989
