= Masters M50 5000 metres world record progression =

This is the progression of world record improvements of the 5000 metres M50 division of Masters athletics.

Key

Incomplete information Pending

Hand	Auto	Athlete	Nationality	Birthdate	Location	Date	Ref
	14:51.38	Francis Kipkoech Bowen	Kenya	12 October 1973	Gothenburg	14 August 2024	
	14:52.92	Sean Wade	United States	02.02.1966	Houston	25.03.2016	
14:53.2		David Martin Rees	United Kingdom	28.02.1953	Neath	10.05.2003	
	14:55.60	Antonio Villanueva	Mexico	25.07.1940	Turku	25.07.1991	
15:06.0		Jean van Onselen	Belgium	13.03.1934	Willebroek	12.09.1984	
15:31.0		Alain Mimoun	France	01.01.1921	Colombes	06.06.1971	
