= Masters W75 1500 metres world record progression =

This is the progression of world record improvements of the 1500 metres W75 division of Masters athletics.

Key

Incomplete information Pending better indoor records

Hand	Auto	Athlete	Nationality	Birthdate	Age	Location	Date	Ref
	5:59.45	Sarah Roberts	Great Britain	6 October 1949	75 years, 350 days	Hemel Hempstead	21 September 2025	
	6:06.20	Sarah Roberts	Great Britain	6 October 1949	75 years, 218 days	London	12 May 2025	
	5:58.15 i	Sarah Roberts	Great Britain	6 October 1949	75 years, 140 days	London	23 February 2025	
	6:14.88	Jeannie Rice	United States	14 April 1948	75 years, 100 days	Greensboro	23 July 2023	
	6:20.93 (Note: ratified after later record mark)	Angela Copson	Great Britain	20 April 1947	75 years, 52 days	Derby	11 June 2022	
	6:26.74 (Note: ratified before earlier record mark)	Angela Copson	Great Britain	20 April 1947	75 years, 78 days	Tampere	7 July 2022	
	6:34.22	Elfriede Hodapp	Germany	15 June 1935	75 years, 17 days	Kevelaer	2 July 2010	
	6:41.15	Doris Dalgaard	Denmark	10 November 1930	75 years, 256 days	Poznań	24 July 2006	
	6:42.13	Nina Naumenko	Russia	15 June 1925	75 years, 25 days	Jyväskylä	10 July 2000	
	7:06.13	Johanna Luther	Germany	2 August 1913	77 years, 359 days	Turku	27 July 1991	
	7:30.01	Bertha Hielscher	Germany	17 November 1908	75 years, 282 days	Brighton	25 August 1984	
