= Masters W55 shot put world record progression =

Masters W55 shot put world record progression is the progression of world record improvements of the shot put W55 division of Masters athletics. Records must be set in properly conducted, official competitions under the standing IAAF rules unless modified by World Masters Athletics. The W55 division consists of female athletes who have reached the age of 55 but have not yet reached the age of 60, so exactly from their 55th birthday to the day before their 60th birthday. The W55 division throws a 3 kg implement.

Key

Incomplete information Pending Indoor mark before 2000, not acceptable for record

Distance	Athlete	Nationality	Birthdate	Location	Date
14.53 i	Mihaela Loghin	Romania	01.06.1952	Ghent	18.03.2011
14.47	Sigrun Kofink	Germany	23.04.1935	Turku	21.07.1991
12.97	Rosemary Chrimes	United Kingdom	19.05.1933	San Diego	20.07.1989
12.24	Lea Maremäe Pettai	Estonia	13.10.1930		1987
11.50	Sylvia White	Australia	05.11.1929	Adelaide	24.11.1984
