= Masters W70 javelin 500g world record progression =

Masters W70 javelin world record progression is the progression of world record improvements of the javelin throw W70 division of Masters athletics. Records must be set in properly conducted, official competitions under the standing IAAF rules unless modified by World Masters Athletics. The W70 division consists of female athletes who have reached the age of 70 but have not yet reached the age of 75, so exactly from their 70th birthday to the day before their 75th birthday. Since 2014, the W70 division throws a 500 g implement.

Key

Incomplete information Pending

Distance	Athlete	Nationality	Birthdate	Age	Location	Date	Ref
34.83 m	Vanda Srbová Marušová	Czech Republic	8 December 1953	70 years, 166 days	Kladno	22 May 2024	
32.69 m	Vanda Srbová Marušová	United States	8 December 1953	70 years, 134 days	Prague	20 April 2024	
31.88 m	Linda Cohn	United States	7 December 1952	70 years, 86 days	Long Beach	3 March 2023	
29.03 m	Masako Suzuki	Japan	12 March 1946	72 years, 230 days	Nara	28 October 2018	
29.32 m	Jarmila Klimešová	Czech Republic	5 November 1947	70 years, 309 days	Čakovec	25 August 2018	
27.95 m	Jarmila Klimešová	Czech Republic	5 November 1947	70 years, 293 days	Málaga	10 September 2018	
27.88 m	Carol Frost	United States	8 March 1945	70 years, 158 days	Des Moines	13 August 2015	
25.97 m	Adelheid Graber-Bollinger	Switzerland	1 April 1943	71 years, 81 days	Götzis	21 June 2014	
