= Mary Bowermaster =

American athlete (1917–2011)

Mary L. Bowermaster (July 26, 1917 – March 4, 2011) was a nurse's aide for schools in Butler County, Ohio, until a breast cancer diagnosis in 1979. After a mastectomy and successfully battling the disease, she began a second career in masters athletics.

Bowermaster, who was born in Wellsville, Ohio, is the current American record holder in the W80 long jump and shot put, and has pending marks that are superior to the listed record in the W80 and W85 100 metres. She also holds the current W80 American Indoor records in the 60 metres, long jump and shot put.

As part of her recovery from the operation, she began exercising. The following year, she competed in her first Senior Olympics. Five years later she set the W65 world record in the high jump at the (WAVA) World Masters Athletics Championships in Melbourne, Australia. A regular competitor at various championship meets, she has set numerous other records as she has progressed through the age divisions. Her story has been covered by Mike Wallace on 60 Minutes, plus 48 Hours, Charles Kuralt, ESPN and CNN.

After I had my mastectomy, I was just down and out and didn’t know what to do with my life. [Competing] opened up a whole new world to me. The window just opened up.

She carried the Olympic Torch for the 2002 Winter Olympics as it passed through Covington, Kentucky. She is a member of the Ohio Women’s Hall of Fame, the Ohio Senior Citizens Hall of Fame, the Ohio Senior Olympics Hall of Fame, the Butler County Sports Hall of Fame, and the USATF Masters Hall of Fame. She was the Greater Cincinnati Women Sports Association Senior Sports Woman of the Year in 1997, and the USATF Masters Track and Field Athlete of the Year five times.
