= Masters M90 400 metres world record progression =

This is the progression of world record improvements of the 400 metres M90 division of Masters athletics.

Key

Incomplete information Pending

| Hand | Auto | Athlete | Nationality | Birthdate | Age | Location | Date | Ref |
|---|---|---|---|---|---|---|---|---|
| | 1:29.15 | Earl Fee | Canada | 22 March 1929 | 90 years, 119 days | Toronto | 19 July 2019 | |
| | 1:29.35 | Yoshiyuki Shimizu | Brazil | 14 July 1928 | 90 years, 62 days | Málaga | 14 September 2018 | |
| | 1:35.04 | Ugo Sansonetti | Italy | 10 January 1919 | 90 years, 199 days | Lahti | 28 July 2009 | |
| | 1:38.69 | Ernst Friedrich Mahlo | Germany | 5 June 1912 | 90 years, 77 days | Potsdam | 21 August 2002 | |
| | 1:59.76 | Murthy Narayana | India | | | Turku | July 1991 | |
| 2:00.2 h | | Paul Spangler | United States | 18 March 1899 | | | 1989 | |
