= Masters M90 200 metres world record progression =

This is the progression of world record improvements of the 200 metres M90 division of Masters athletics.

Key

Incomplete information Wind aided Pending

Hand	Auto	Wind	Athlete	Nationality	Birthdate	Location	Date
	36.02	1.1	Hiroo Tanaka	Japan	8 December 1930	Rokkasho	23 May 2021
	36.97	+0.8	Yoshiyuki Shimizu	Brazil	14 July 1928	Porto Alegre	1 November 2019
	37.00	+0.8	Yoshiyuki Shimizu	Brazil	14 July 1928	Sao Bernardo do Campo	17 November 2018
	37.16	-1.4	Yoshiyuki Shimizu	Brazil	14 July 1928	Málaga	9 September 2018
	38.04	0.0	Lucas Nel	South Africa	20 July 1923	Porto Alegre	22 October 2013
	38.57	-1.5	Frederico Fischer	Brazil	06.01.1917	Riccione	4 September 2007
	39.82	1.0	Herbert Liedtke	Sweden	29 April 1916	Söderhamn	20 August 2006
	40.00	0.1	Vittorio Colo	Italy	9 November 1911	Potsdam	24 August 2002
	42.78	-1.4	Anthony Castro	United States	3 August 1909	San Diego	18 September 1999
	44.77		Murthy Narayana	India		Turku	July 1991
48.6			Collister Wheeler	United States	20 June 1893		
