= Christa Bortignon =

Canadian track and field athlete

Christa Bortignon (b. Jan 29, 1937) is a Canadian masters track and field athlete from West Vancouver, British Columbia.

She holds thirteen world records in the Women's 75-79 division — five indoor (60m, 60m hurdles, 200m, pentathlon, 4X200 relay), and eight outdoor (100m, 200m, 400m, 80m hurdles, 200m hurdles, triple jump, pentathlon and heptathlon).

In 2013, she was chosen the World Masters Athletics, World Female Masters Athlete of the Year. She was also the 2014 Canadian Masters Athletics (CMA) Canadian Athlete of the year.

A former competitive tennis player, she began competing in Masters Track and Field in 2009, at age 72.
