= Olga Kotelko =

Canadian track and field athlete (1919–2014)

Personal information
- Born: 2 March 1919
- Died: 24 June 2014 (aged 95)

Olga Kotelko (2 March 1919 – 24 June 2014) was a Canadian track and field athlete. She held over 30 world records and won over 750 gold medals in her age category for the Masters competition, age 90–95, and was considered "one of the world's greatest athletes" as a result. She held every track and field world record she attempted for her age group.

== Early life ==
Kotelko was the 7th of 11 children born to Ukrainian immigrant farmers Wasyl and Ann Shawaga in Smuts, Saskatchewan. In 1941, she graduated from the Saskatoon Normal School, now a part of the Faculty of Education at the University of Saskatchewan, and began her career as a teacher in a one-room school in Vonda, Saskatchewan. Her marriage broke up while she was pregnant with her second child. She moved to British Columbia to live with her sister. She raised her two children, Nadine and Lynda, and earned a college degree in night classes.

== Sports career ==
In her youth, her only athletic activity was playing baseball. After her retirement from teaching in 1984, she took up slow-pitch softball. She made a double play at age 70, while playing second base. She gave up her place on the softball team to a 55-year-old and took up track and field because it would take advantage of the running and throwing skills she had developed playing softball. At age 77, she started training for track and field events with a Hungarian coach. At the 13th WAVA (World Association of Veteran Athletes) World Championships in Gateshead, England in 1999 in the "W80" category, she broke two world records and six gold medals. At the World Masters Games in Sydney, Australia in 2009, she broke a world record for her age group (90–95 years) in the hammer throw (5.64 metre) and the 100 metre race (23.95 seconds). It was her fourth time competing in the World competition. She carried the Olympic torch in Vancouver in 2010 before the XXI Winter Olympic Games. In 2010, at age 91, her performance far surpassed that of many competitors two age brackets younger.

By 2010, she held 23 age-graded world records in the Masters track and field competition. Events she competed in include "long jump, triple jump, high jump, shot put, discus, javelin, weight throw and the 100-metres, 200-metres and 400-metres and 4 x 100-metre relay sprints," according to "The Gazette" of Montreal. Sometimes she had competition, but some of the victories were due to no other women her age running the event. At age 90 she was described as the world's oldest known long jump competitor.

== Scientific studies ==
Her physiology and her muscle tissue have been studied by doctors at the Montreal Neurological Institute and at McGill University's Montreal Chest Institute. Her muscle fibers at age 91 were found to be remarkably lacking in the mitochondrial decay expected in someone over 65.

== Death ==
Kotelko died on 24 June 2014, in North Vancouver, at age 95, of an intracranial hemorrhage. She was survived by her daughter, Lynda, and two grandchildren. Her eldest daughter Nadine predeceased her in 1999, as well as her 10 siblings. The week before her death, she had competed in three events in the rain at Langley Pacific Invitational in Langley BC.
