= 1987 World Masters Athletics Championships =

Coordinates: 37.824722°S 144.981389°E

- Dates: 28 November - 6 December 1987
- Host city: Melbourne, Australia
- Venue: Olympic Park Stadium
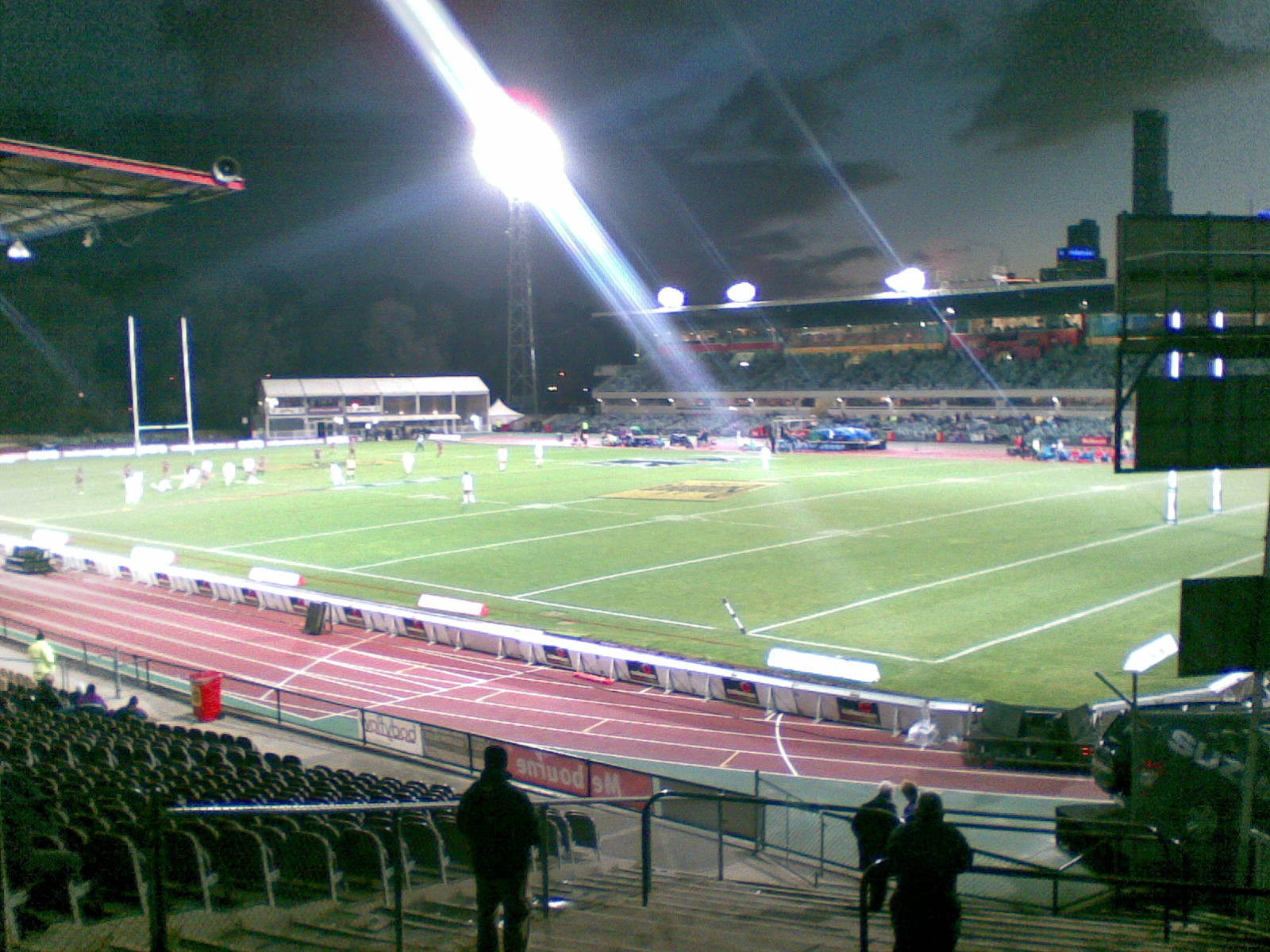
- Level: Masters
- Type: Outdoor
- Participation: 4,817 athletes from 52 nations

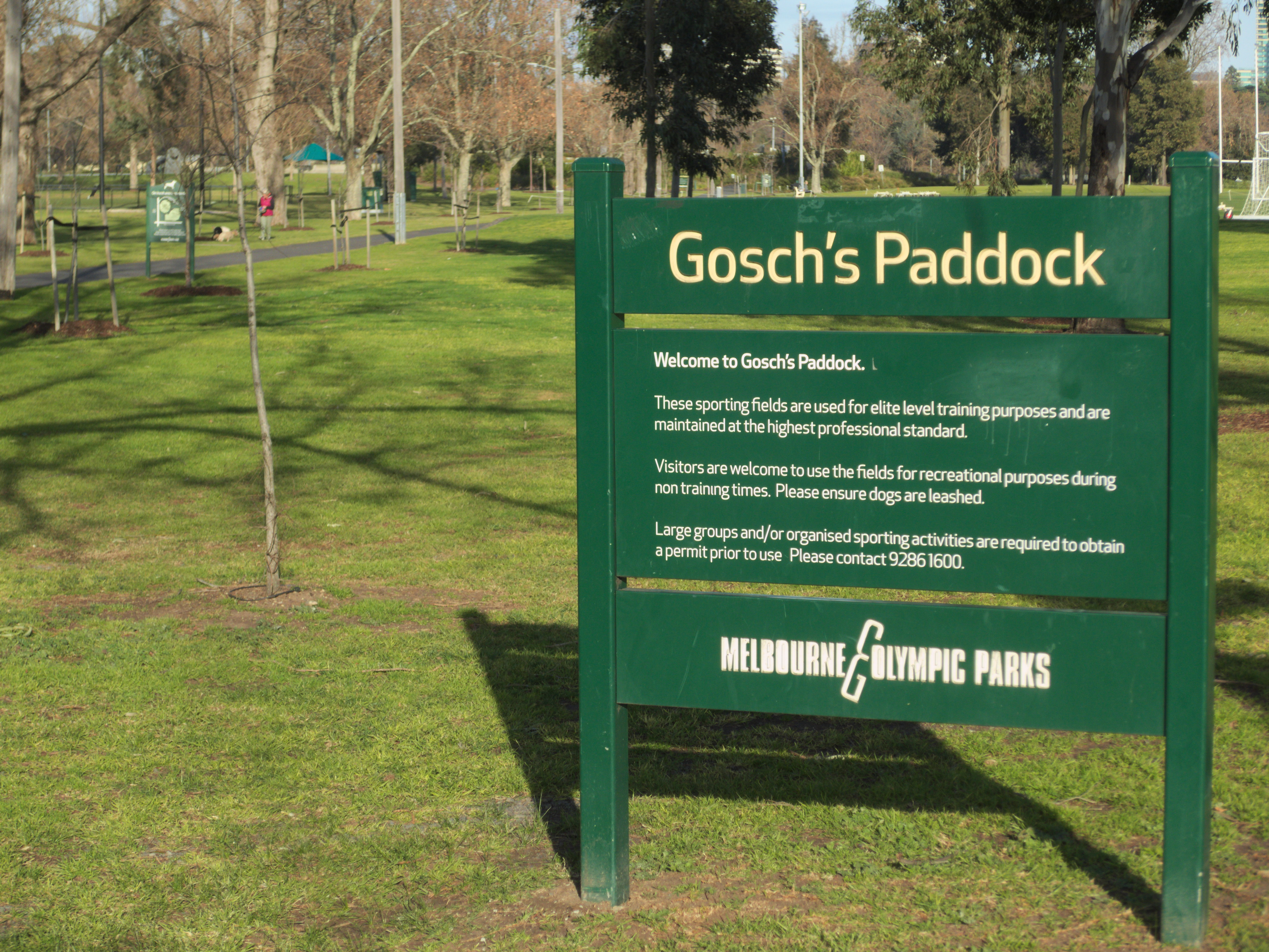
Gosch's Paddock

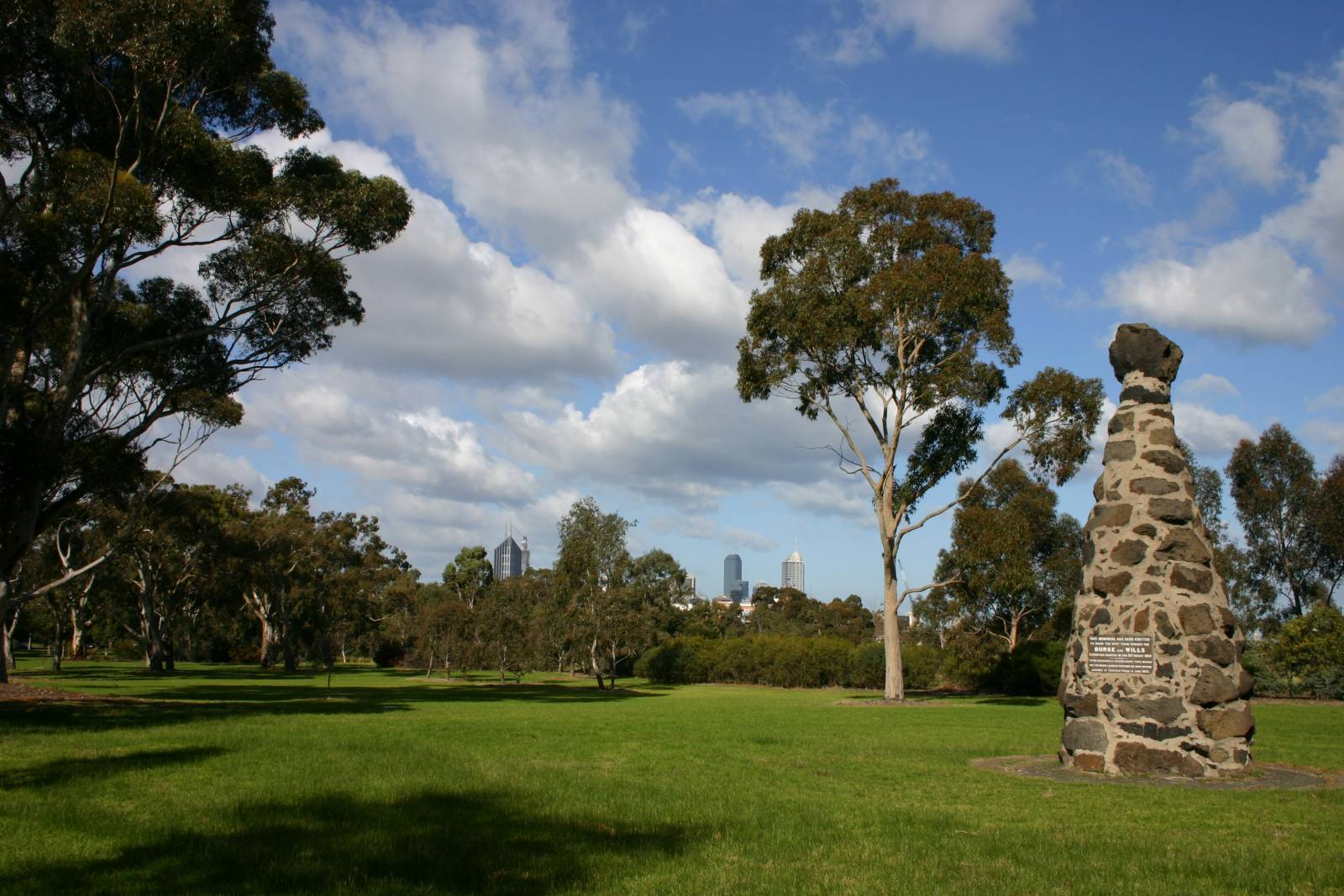
Royal Park

1987 World Masters Athletics Championships is the seventh in a series of World Masters Athletics Outdoor Championships (called World Veterans Games or World Masters Games at the time) that took place in Melbourne, Australia, from 28 November to 6 December 1987. The 4,000+ participating athletes made this the largest track and field meet in the world.

The main venue was Olympic Park Stadium, which had hosted the 1956 Summer Olympics. A World Games Promotional Track and Field Meet was held at Olympic Park Stadium on 7 December, 1986 as a warm-up publicity showcase. The stadium was later demolished in 2011 and replaced by Olympic Park Oval. Throwing events were held in Gosch's Paddock next to the tracks. Cross Country was held at Royal Park. The marathon course included Port Melbourne, South Melbourne, St Kilda and Elwood, with start and finish at Olympic Park Stadium.

The three-time Olympian Raelene Boyle carried a friendship torch into the stadium to light an Olympic-style flame during opening ceremonies on Sunday, 29 November.

This edition of masters athletics Championships had a minimum age limit of 35 years for women and 40 years for men.

The governing body of this series is World Association of Veteran Athletes (WAVA). WAVA was formed during meeting at the inaugural edition of this series at Toronto in 1975, then officially founded during the second edition in 1977, then renamed as World Masters Athletics (WMA) at the Brisbane Championships in 2001.

This Championships was organized by WAVA in coordination with a Local Organising Committee (LOC) of Peg Smith, Ray Callaghan.

In addition to a full range of track and field events, non-stadia events included 10K Cross Country, 10K Race Walk (women), 20K Race Walk (men), and Marathon. After an experimental suspension of the relays in 1983 and forming regional relay teams in 1985, relays reverted to national teams for this Championships.

== Controversy ==
After 1976, when the International Amateur Athletic Federation (IAAF) expelled the Amateur Athletic Union of South Africa over the apartheid policy of the South African government, the participation of South African athletes in WAVA competitions had been at odds with the IAAF, specifically due to the 1977 WAVA constitution which had stated that

no competitor be barred because of race, religion, ethnic background, or national origin.

As a compromise, South Africans often competed under the flag of other nations in previous editions of these Championships.

During General Assembly at this Championships, WAVA delegates approved a motion to amend the WAVA constitution and exclude countries whose national federation is suspended by the IAAF. Thus South African athletes were now officially banned from these Championships, and would not be welcomed back until the 1993 edition in Miyazaki, after the abolition of apartheid and the readmittance of South Africa into IAAF in 1992.

== World Records ==
Past Championships results are archived at WMA. Additional archives are available from Museum of Masters Track & Field as a pdf book, as a searchable pdf, and in a pdf newsletter.

Several masters world records were set at this Championships. World records for 1987 are from the list of World Records in the Museum of Masters Track & Field searchable pdf unless otherwise noted.

After the relays on the last day of competition (Sunday, 6 December), the 3 medalists from each of the 1500m races were invited to participate in a special "Masters Mile", where 4 world records were broken.

Key: Wind aided

=== Women ===
Event	Athlete(s)	Nationality	Performance
W65 100 Meters	Paula Schneiderhan	FRG	15.04
W65 200 Meters	Aileen Hogan	AUS	32.23
W65 400 Meters	Paula Schneiderhan	FRG	1:14.31
W60 1500 Meters	Shirley Brasher	AUS	5:44.81
W60 5000 Meters	Shirley Brasher	AUS	21:14.53
W50 Mile	Jeanne Hoagland	USA	5:29.39
W60 10000 Meters	Shirley Brasher	AUS	44:32.50
W60 10000 Meters	Lenore Marvin	CAN	48:50.40
W40 80 Meters Hurdles	Phil Raschker	USA	11.92
W50 80 Meters Hurdles	Corrie Roovers-van den Bosch	NED	12.54
W50 80 Meters Hurdles	Corrie Roovers-van den Bosch	NED	13.02
W70 80 Meters Hurdles	Rosaline Sole	NZL	16.24
W50 300 Meters Hurdles	Brenda Parkinson	AUS	49.78
W50 300 Meters Hurdles	Pirkko Martin	FIN	52.01
W55 300 Meters Hurdles	Asta Larssen	SWE	56.92
W40 400 Meters Hurdles	Jan Hynes	AUS	1:03.58
W45 400 Meters Hurdles	Annelise Damm Olesen	DEN	1:07.33
W40 5K Race Walk	Jane Jackson	AUS	24:50.85
W50 5K Race Walk	Joan Hooper	AUS	26:35.39
W55 5K Race Walk	Jean Albury	AUS	26:46.92
W60 5K Race Walk	Marj Colthup	AUS	30:10.92
W65 5K Race Walk	Britta Tibbling	SWE	29:32.85
W75 5K Race Walk	Ailsa Forbes	NZL	36:22.59
W80 5K Race Walk	Marilla Salisbury	USA	43:08.68
W65 Long Jump	Paula Schneiderhan	FRG	4.47
W55 High Jump	Daphne Pirie	AUS	1.35
W60 High Jump	Kirsten Hveem	NOR	1.22
W65 High Jump	Gwen Davidson	AUS	1.22
W70 High Jump	Mary Bowermaster	USA	1.13
W35 Triple Jump	Eileen Hindle	AUS	11.30
W40 Triple Jump	Phil Raschker	USA	11.16
W50 Triple Jump	Dorothy Wittam	AUS	9.28
W55 Triple Jump	Patricia Carr	AUS	8.75
W60 Triple Jump	Kirsten Hveem	NOR	8.78
W65 Triple Jump	Gwen Davidson	AUS	7.22
W50 Shot Put	Valerie Young	NZL	14.85
W50 Discus Throw	Valerie Young	NZL	43.54
W70 Discus Throw	Annchen Reile	FRG	22.58
W35 Hammer throw	Christine Schultz}	AUS	40.36
W40 Hammer throw	Christine Battersby	AUS	31.28
W40 Hammer throw	Bev Savage	NZL	31.28
W45 Hammer throw	Irene Mitchell	AUS	34.10
W50 Hammer throw	Annemarie Scholten	FRG	33.02
W55 Hammer throw	Wini Pepene	NZL	20.90
W60 Hammer throw	Lydia Widera	AUS	30.46
W65 Hammer throw	Ilse Bellin	FRG	27.98
W60 Javelin Throw	Bernice Holland	USA	28.30

=== Men ===
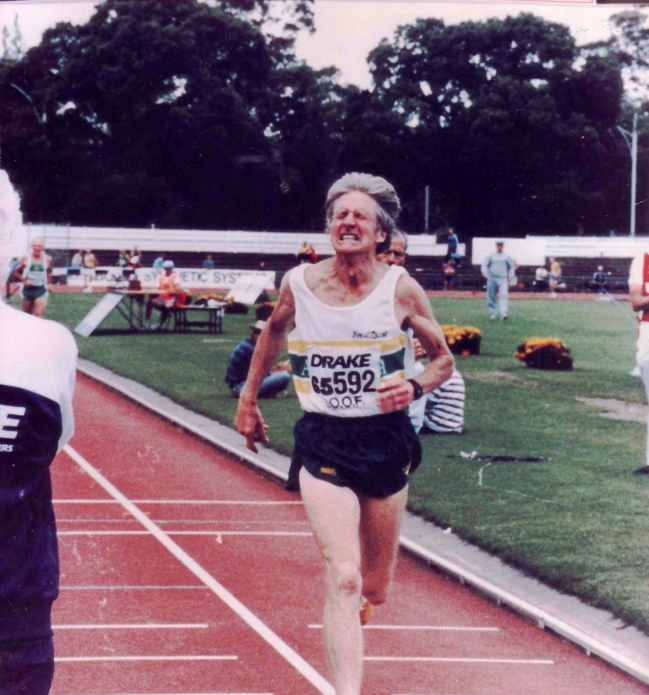
Jack Ryan M65 Mile

Event	Athlete(s)	Nationality	Performance
M40 100 Meters	George McNeill	GBR	10.95
M55 100 Meters	Charles Williams	GBR	11.62
M70 100 Meters	Payton Jordan	USA	12.72
M60 100 Meters	Peter Mirkes	FRG	12.00
M95 100 Meters	Prithvi Singh Azad	IND	39.00
M80 200 Meters	Harry Gathercole	AUS	32.14
M95 200 Meters	Prithvi Singh Azad	IND	1:39.59
M45 400 Meters	Hanno Rheineck	FRG	50.46
M50 400 Meters	Reginald Austin	AUS	51.81
M55 400 Meters	Charles Williams	GBR	53.98
M85 400 Meters	Longino Perez	MEX	1:31.54
M85 800 Meters	Longino Perez	MEX	3:29.42
M45 1500 Meters	David Siri	NZL	4:01.47
M65 1500 Meters	Jack Ryan	AUS	4:41.82
M80 1500 Meters	Ed Benham	USA	6:04.28
M85 1500 Meters	Longino Perez	MEX	7:03.38
M45 Mile	David Siri	NZL	4:16.75
M50 Mile	Tom Roberts	AUS	4:30.06
M65 Mile	Jack Ryan	AUS	5:05.61
M65 5000 Meters	Jack Ryan	AUS	17:43.35
M80 5000 Meters	Ed Benham	USA	22:31.82
M45 10000 Meters	Antonio Villanueva	MEX	30:02.56
M80 10000 Meters	Ed Benham	USA	45:29.27
M75 2000 Meters Steeplechase	Stan Nicholls	AUS	10:32.17
M45 3000 Meters Steeplechase	Ron Robertson	NZL	9:25.28
M70 4 x 400 Meters Relay	Daniel Buckley, Bill Fairbank, Payton Jordan, Bill Weinacht	USA	4:38.39
M75 5K Race Walk	Tom Daintry	AUS	28:02.26
M90 5K Race Walk	Gus Theobald	AUS	35:18.54
M55 20K Race Walk	Louis Marquis	SUI	1:43:17
M75 20K Race Walk	James Grimwade	GBR	1:55:19
M90 20K Race Walk	Gus Theobald	AUS	2:35:47
M50 Long Jump	Pericles Pinto	POR	6.54
M65 Long Jump	Tom Patsalis	USA	5.29
M75 Long Jump	Heikki Simola	FIN	4.45
M80 Long Jump	Gulab Singh	IND	3.80
M60 Triple Jump	Jakob Rypdal	NOR	12.01
M60 Triple Jump	Vaclav Bartl	SWE	12.01
M65 Triple Jump	Tom Patsalis	USA	10.84
M75 Triple Jump	Heikki Simola	FIN	9.52
M80 Triple Jump	Gulab Singh	IND	8.29
M55 High Jump	Herm Wyatt	USA	1.73
M80 High Jump	Gulab Singh	IND	1.20
M75 Shot Put	Gerhard Schepe	FRG	12.11
M80 Shot Put	Karsten Brodersen	FRG	9.69
M85 Shot Put	Herb Anderson	USA	7.17
M90 Shot Put	Wang Jing-Chan	TAI	4.76
M95 Shot Put	Prithvi Singh Azad	IND	4.25
M80 Discus Throw	Karsten Brodersen	FRG	34.08
M50 Hammer throw	Hans Pötsch	AUT	63.56
M65 Hammer throw	Wolfram Hausmann	FRG	47.00
M70 Hammer throw	Ray Foley	AUS	45.24
M80 Hammer throw	Karsten Brodersen	FRG	34.28
M60 Javelin Throw	Del Pickarts	USA	58.48
M65 Javelin Throw	Aloysius Sibidol	MAS	47.28
M70 Javelin Throw	Bill Morales	USA	43.34
M75 Javelin Throw	Gerhard Schepe	FRG	38.52
