= 1993 World Masters Athletics Championships =

Coordinates: 31.8243736°N 131.44588°E

- Dates: 7 - 17 October 1993
- Host city: Miyazaki, Japan
- Venue: Miyazaki Athletic Stadium
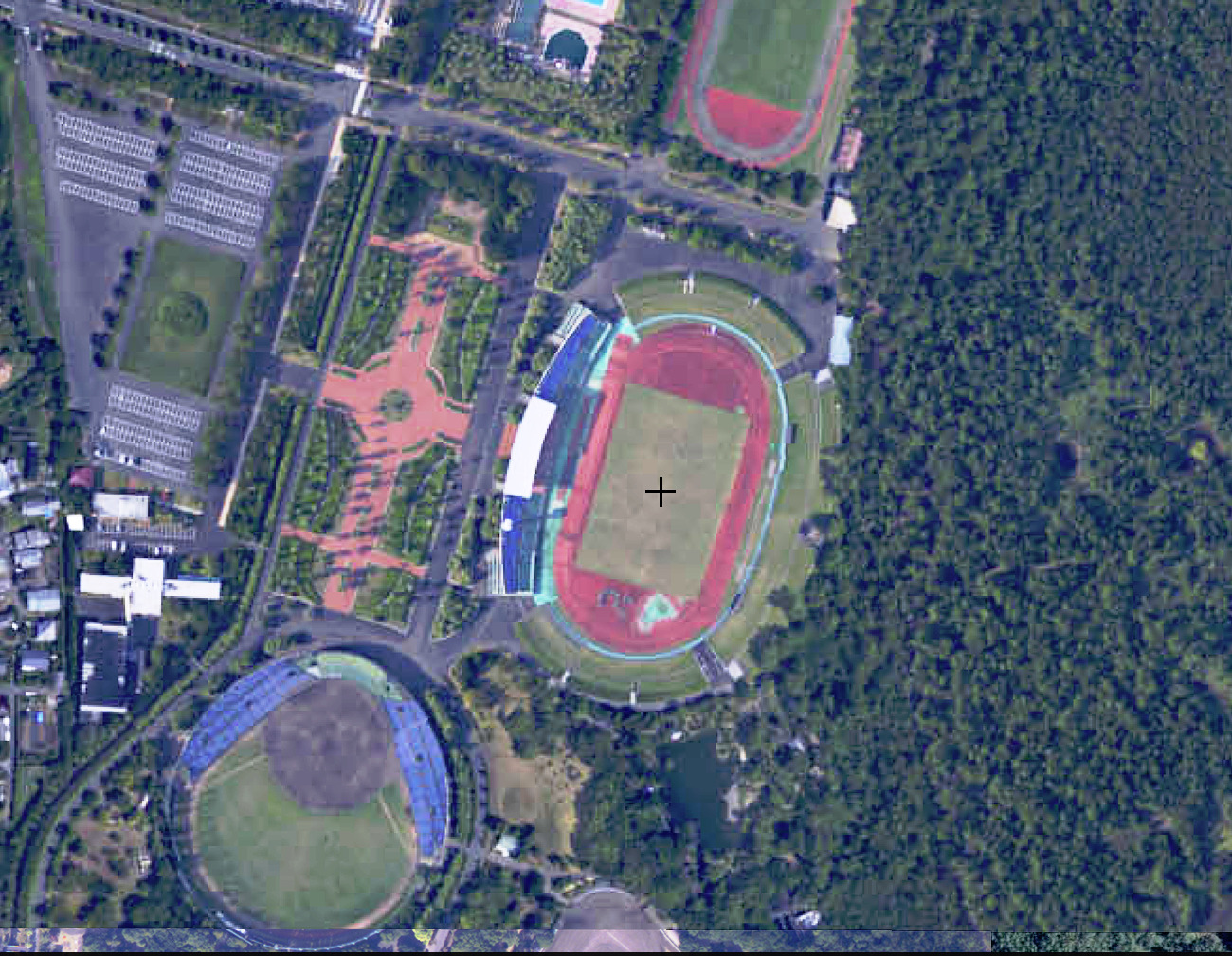
- Level: Masters
- Type: Outdoor
- Participation: 11,475 athletes from 71 nations

1993 World Masters Athletics Championships is the tenth in a series of World Masters Athletics Outdoor Championships (called World Veterans Championships at the time) that took place in Miyazaki, Japan from 7 to 17 October 1993.

The main venue was Miyazaki Athletic Stadium (Japanese: 宮崎県総合運動公園陸上競技場), located within the Miyazaki Prefectural Sports Park. The Sports Park had 3 track facilities and a throwing field, including a 400m track especially built for this Championships. The Japanese government invested $20 million to host this Championships, with a reported loss of $18 million.

The 11,475 participants reported by WMA may actually be over 12,000, more than doubling the previous highs of 4,800+ at the previous three editions of this series. In fact it was the largest track and field meet ever held, only the largest marathons draw more competitors. The host country Japan alone supplied 9,901 athletes, about half of whom were marathoners.

18,000 people attended the most elaborate opening ceremonies of any Championships in this series on Saturday, 9 October.

It featured a 600-member women's choir, a Usutaiko Dance performed by 500 school children, marching by 200 high school students, a 100-member brass band, thousands of balloons, and a parade by nations

The three-time Olympian Evelyn Ashford carried a friendship torch into the stadium to light an Olympic-style flame; she would win the W35 200m in the competitions.

Athletes from China participated for the first time in this series, though with only a token delegation.

This edition of masters athletics Championships had a minimum age limit of 35 years for women and 40 years for men.

The governing body of this series is World Association of Veteran Athletes (WAVA). WAVA was formed during meeting at the inaugural edition of this series at Toronto in 1975, then officially founded during the second edition in 1977, then renamed as World Masters Athletics (WMA) at the Brisbane Championships in 2001.

This Championships was organized by WAVA in coordination with a Local Organising Committee (LOC) headed by Mikio Oda.

In addition to a full range of track and field events, non-stadia events included 10K Cross Country, 10K Race Walk (women), 20K Race Walk (men), and Marathon.

== South Africa ==
South Africa had been expelled by the International Amateur Athletic Federation (IAAF) in 1976 due to the apartheid policy of the South African government at that time. South Africa rejoined IAAF in 1992, after the abolition of the apartheid system, and South African athletes officially participated under their native RSA flag for the first time in this series.

== World Records ==
Past Championships results are archived at WMA. Additional archives are available from Museum of Masters Track & Field as a pdf book and in a pdf newsletter. Detailed results are extracted from the pdf book separately for women and for men.

Several masters world records were set at this Championships. World records for 1993 are from the list of World Records in the Museum of Masters Track & Field pdf book unless otherwise noted.

=== Women ===
Event	Athlete(s)	Nationality	Performance
W55 100 Meters	Una Adella Gore	GBR	13.65
W65 100 Meters	Shirley Peterson	NZL	14.98
W70 100 Meters	Paula Schneiderhan	GER	15.42
W70 100 Meters	Anna Mangler	GER	16.09
W80 100 Meters	Johanna Gelbrich	GER	18.41
W70 200 Meters	Paula Schneiderhan	GER	33.26
W70 200 Meters	Anna Mangler	GER	33.42
W70 400 Meters	Anna Mangler	GER	1:19.14
W45 800 Meters	Judy Bandiera	AUS	2:17.06
W45 800 Meters	Avril Douglas	CAN	2:18.76
W60 800 Meters	Jean Horne	CAN	2:51.27
W80 800 Meters	Johanna Luther	GER	3:54.81
W85 800 Meters	Matsue Nishiyama	JPN	5:14.43
W80 1500 Meters	Johanna Luther	GER	7:32.22
W80 1500 Meters	Rosario Iglesias Rocha	MEX	8:47.41
W80 5000 Meters	Johanna Luther	GER	28:32.67
W85 5000 Meters	Matsue Nishiyama	JPN	37:02.30
W50 10000 Meters	Ursula Odermatt	SUI	36:51.28
W80 10000 Meters	Johanna Luther	GER	58:40.03
W60 80 Meters Hurdles	Asta Larsson	SWE	14.78
W65 80 Meters Hurdles	Isabel Hofmeyr	RSA	18.33
W60 300 Meters Hurdles	Asta Larsson	SWE	58.59
W65 300 Meters Hurdles	Isabel Hofmeyr	RSA	1:05.67
W75 5K Race Walk	Britta Tibbling	SWE	32:44.76
W75 10K Race Walk	Britta Tibbling	SWE	1:07:46
W55 Long Jump	Christiane Schmalbruch	GER	4.80
W70 Long Jump	Paula Schneiderhan	GER	3.58
W80 Long Jump	Ruth Frith	AUS	2.26
W35 Triple Jump	Conceição Geremias	BRA	12.40
W50 Triple Jump	Erika Springmann	GER	10.08
W55 Triple Jump	Christiane Schmalbruch	GER	9.82
W65 Triple Jump	Shirley Peterson	NZL	9.03
W65 Triple Jump	Leonore McDaniels	USA	7.66
W70 Triple Jump	Sheila Muriel Campbell	RSA	6.85
W80 Triple Jump	Ruth Frith	AUS	5.65
W45 High Jump	Alena Plischke	AUT	1.58
W45 High Jump	Phil Raschker	USA	1.55
W55 High Jump	Christiane Schmalbruch	GER	1.38
W35 Pole Vault	Maret Kalviste	EST	2.80
W35 Pole Vault	Marie Claire Fabardine	FRA	2.68
W45 Pole Vault	Phil Raschker	USA	3.14
W50 Pole Vault	Petra Pietersen	RSA	2.44
W55 Pole Vault	Dorothy McLennan	IRL	2.00
W55 Pole Vault	Ingegerd Marianne Stenholm	SWE	1.62
W55 Pole Vault	Midori Yamamoto	JPN	1.54
W60 Shot Put	Rosemary Chrimes	GBR	12.20
W60 Shot Put	Jutta Schaefer	GER	11.04
W70 Shot Put	Lena Grobler	RSA	8.44
W60 Discus Throw	Rosemary Chrimes	GBR	37.56
W60 Discus Throw	Antonina Ivanova	RUS	33.72
W75 Discus Throw	Annchen Reile	GER	21.22
W40 Hammer throw	Annie Bellanger	FRA	42.02
M45 Hammer throw	Inge Faldager	DEN	44.56
W55 Hammer throw	Evaun Williams	GBR	43.88
W60 Hammer throw	Jutta Schaefer	GER	40.46
W60 Hammer throw	Antonina Ivanova	RUS	38.42
W60 Hammer throw	Elisabeth Dwenger	GER	30.88
W60 Javelin Throw	Lieselotte Leiss	GER	32.58
W80 Javelin Throw	Johanna Gelbrich	GER	19.86

=== Men ===
Event	Athlete(s)	Nationality	Performance
M80 100 Meters	Yuichi Tateishi	JPN	15.33
M85 200 Meters	Harry Gathercole	AUS	35.99
M50 400 Meters	Isao Harold Morioka	CAN	51.76
M70 1500 Meters	Gordon McKeown	AUS	5:09.64
M70 80 Meters Hurdles	Albertus Van Zyl	RSA	13.97
M80 80 Meters Hurdles	Mazumi Morita	JPN	16.98
M75 2000 Meters Steeplechase	Daniel Buckley	USA	9:44.19
M80 2000 Meters Steeplechase	Tadashi Tau	JPN	11:51.48
M80 2000 Meters Steeplechase	Robert Boal	USA	13:14.33
M55 Long Jump	Hellmuth Klimmer	GER	6.11
M80 Long Jump	Mazumi Morita	JPN	4.12
M80 Long Jump	Giichi Suda	JPN	3.98
M80 Triple Jump	Mazumi Morita	JPN	8.95
M50 High Jump	Dieter Wille	GER	1.88
M50 Shot Put	Klaus Liedtke	GER	17.60
M55 Shot Put	Joe Keshmiri	USA	15.85
M65 Shot Put	Torsten Von Wachenfeldt	SWE	14.43
M80 Shot Put	Gerhard Schepe	GER	12.02
M45 Hammer throw	Murofushi Shigenobu	JPN	63.46
M40 Javelin Throw	Jorma Markus	FIN	75.08
M70 Javelin Throw	Erik Eriksson	FIN	46.28
