= 2005 World Masters Athletics Championships =

Coordinates: 43.301378°N 1.973617°W

- Dates: 22 August - 3 September 2005
- Host city: San Sebastián, Spain
- Venue: Anoeta Stadium
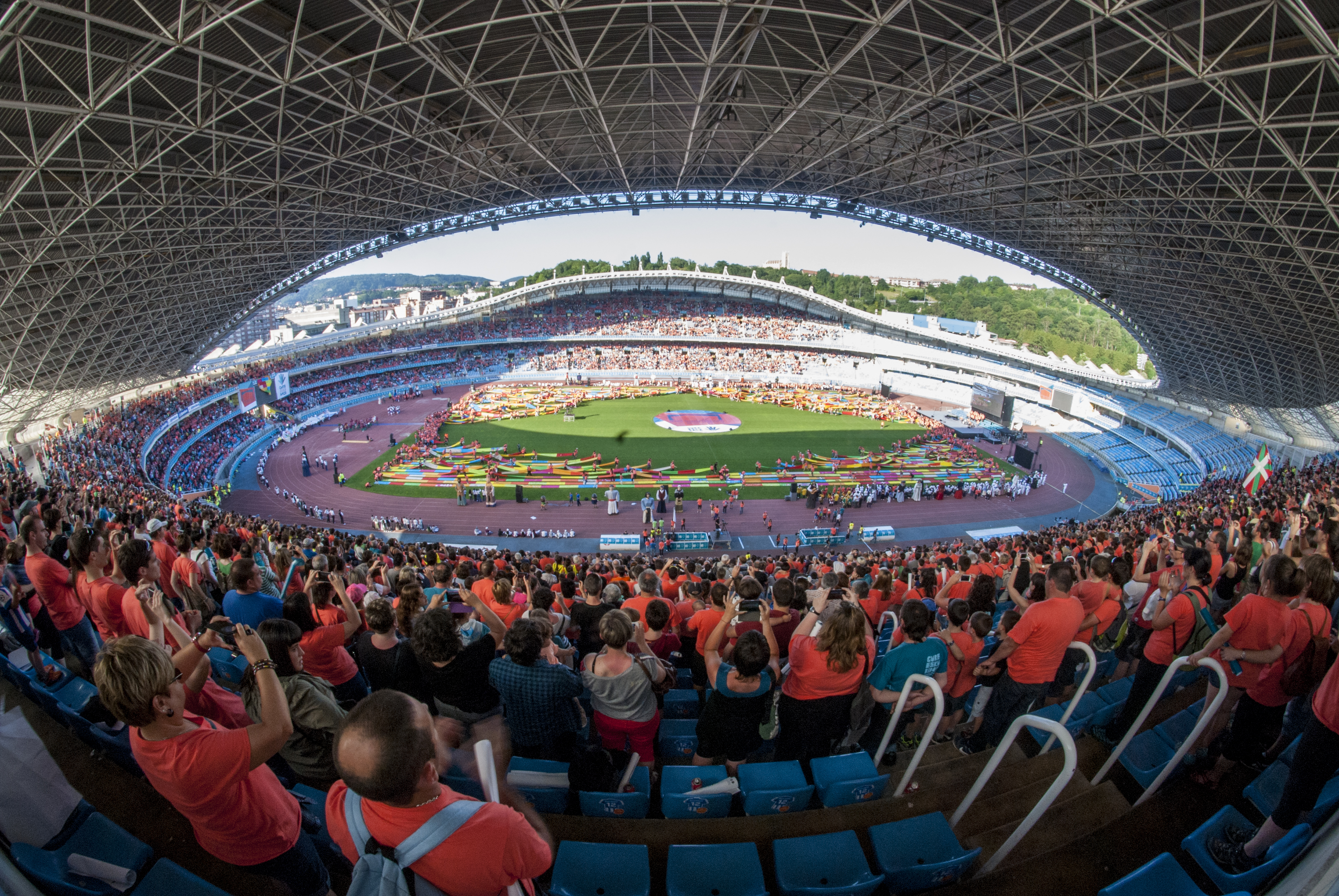
- Level: Masters
- Type: Outdoor
- Participation: 6030 athletes from 91 nations
- Official website: Archived 2005-11-08 at the Wayback Machine

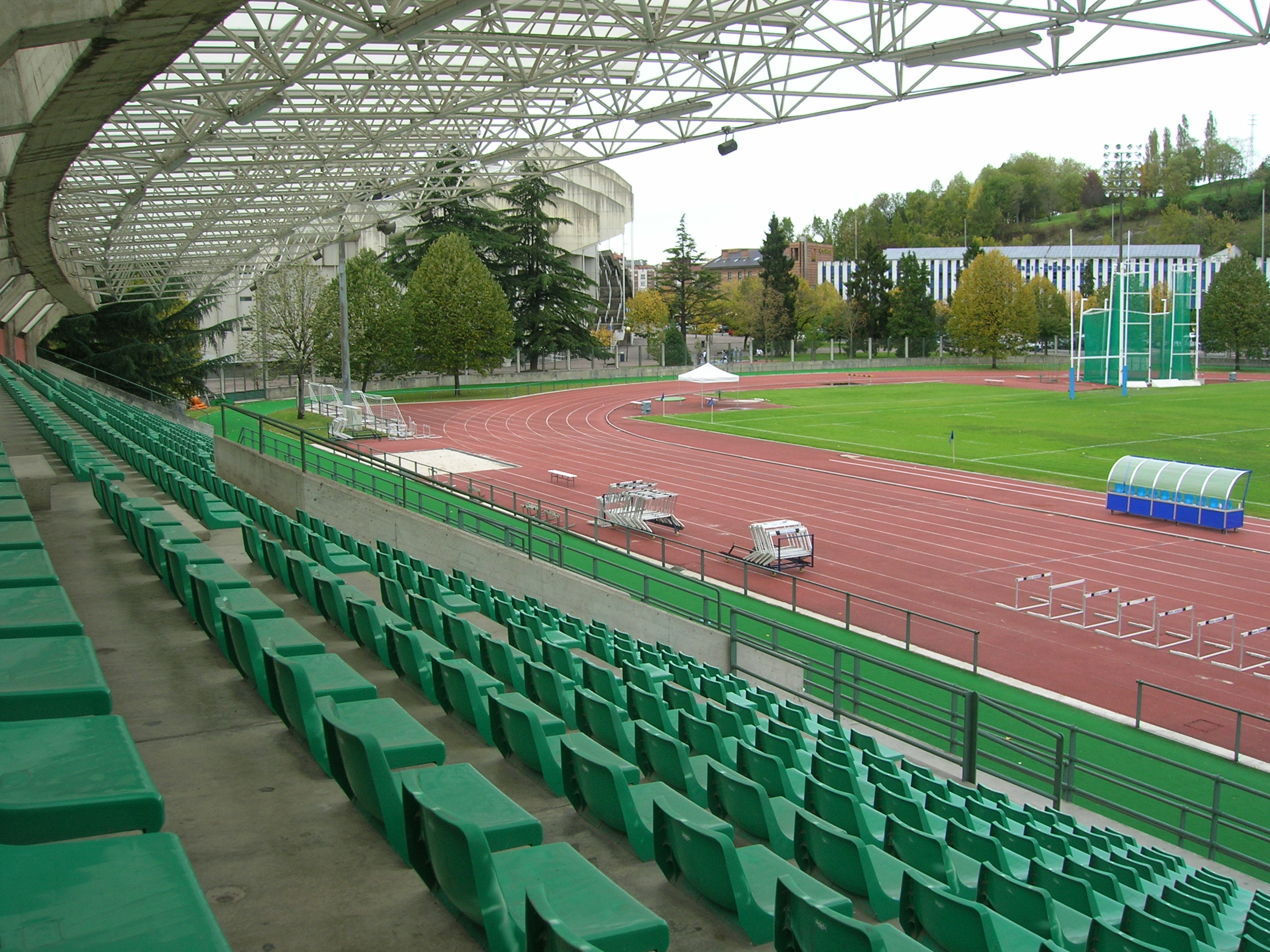
Miniestadio de Anoeta

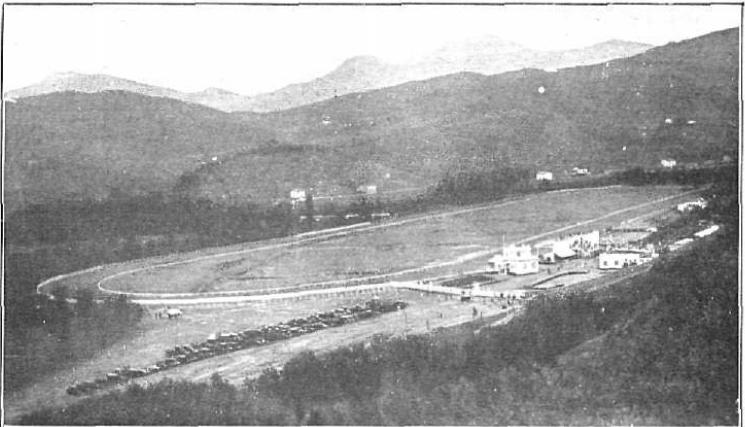
Lasarte Racetrack

2005 World Masters Athletics Championships is the sixteenth in a series of World Masters Athletics Outdoor Championships that took place in San Sebastián (Basque: Donostia), Spain from 22 August to 3 September 2005.

The main venue was Anoeta Stadium, which had its running track removed after renovations in 2017. Some stadia events were held at the adjacent Miniestadio de Anoeta within the same sports complex. Non-stadia venues included Estadio Daniel Hernani (Pista de Hernani) for throwing events, and Lasarte Racetrack (Donostia Hippodrome) for Cross Country.

This Championships was organized by World Masters Athletics (WMA) in coordination with a Local Organising Committee (LOC). The WMA is the global governing body of the sport of athletics for athletes 35 years of age or older, setting rules for masters athletics competition. The starting age had been 35 years for women and 40 years for men in previous editions in this series, but the men minimum age was reduced to 35 at the General Assembly of the 2003 Championships.

In addition to a full range of track and field events, non-stadia events included 8K Cross Country, 10K Race Walk (women), 20K Race Walk (men), and Marathon.

== World Records ==
Official daily results are archived at conersys.com. Past Championships results are archived at WMA. Additional archives are available from Masters Athletics, from British Masters Athletic Federation in html, and from Museum of Masters Track & Field in html and as a National Masters News pdf newsletter.

Several masters world records were set at this Championships. World records for 2005 are from the list of World Records in the National Masters News newsletter unless otherwise noted. A highlight of the competitions was Wolfgang Knabe (GER) defeating Willie Banks (USA) in the Triple Jump.

=== Women ===
Event	Athlete(s)	Nationality	Performance
W70 100 Meters	Margaret Peters	NZL	15.08
W80 800 Meters	Nina Naumenko	RUS	3:45.00
W75 10000 Meters	Melitta Czerwenka Nagel	GER	50:00.93
W80 10000 Meters	Nina Naumenko	RUS	58:24.70
W40 80 Meters Hurdles	Monica Pellegrinelli	SUI	11.24
W60 300 Meters Hurdles	Marge Allison	AUS	51.64
W65 300 Meters Hurdles	Rietje Dijkman	NED	56.86
W40 400 Meters Hurdles	Barbara Gähling	GER	59.76
W50 4 x 100 Meters Relay	Edna Roe, Helen Godsell, Joylyn Saunders-Mullins, Caroline Powell	GBR	53.31
W50 4 x 400 Meters Relay	Helen Godsell, Edna Roe, Joylyn Saunders-Mullins, Caroline Powell	GBR	4:17.60
W75 Triple Jump	Hideko Koshikawa	JPN	7.30
W75 Triple Jump	Elsa Enarsson	SWE	7.13
W80 Pole Vault	Johnnye Valien	USA	1.40
W65 Discus Throw	Tamara Danilova	RUS	37.62
W65 Javelin Throw	Birutė Kalėdienė	LTU	28.66
W65 Weight Pentathlon	Evaun Williams	GBR	5574
W70 Weight Pentathlon	Susanne Wissinger	GER	5181
W40 Heptathlon	Barbara Gähling	GER	5929
W45 Heptathlon	Marie Kay	AUS	6094
W60 Heptathlon	Marianne Maier	AUT	5740
W65 Heptathlon	Erika Sauer	GER	5963
W80 Heptathlon	Johnnye Valien	USA	5521

=== Men ===
Event	Athlete(s)	Nationality	Performance
M70 200 Meters	Hugh Coogan	AUS	26.84
M75 800 Meters	Earl Fee	CAN	2:36.28
M80 80 Meters Hurdles	Melvin Larsen	USA	14.75
M45 110 Meters Hurdles	Karl Smith	JAM	14.70
M75 300 Meters Hurdles	Earl Fee	CAN	52.91
M35 4 x 100 Meters Relay	Tecumseh Peete, Robert Thomas, David Jones, Don Drummond	USA	42.62
M70 4 x 100 Meters Relay	Horst Schrader, Bruno Kimmel, Rudolf Bockl, Karl Heinz Newmann	GER	53.03
M80 4 x 100 Meters Relay	Horst Albrecht, Rudolf Breder, Gerhard Herbst, Kurt Schumacher	GER	64.68
M35 4 x 400 Meters Relay	Sherwin Sterling, Don Drummond, Larry Gardner, Robert Thomas	USA	3:19.90
M85 High Jump	Emmerich Zensch	AUT	1.22
M45 Triple Jump	Wolfgang Knabe	GER	14.78
M35 Weight Pentathlon	Jochen Koppenhoefer	GER	3628
M40 Weight Pentathlon	Steve Whyte	GBR	4176
M75 Weight Pentathlon	Richard Rzehak	GER	5007
M40 Decathlon	Kip Janvrin	USA	8542
M60 Decathlon	Rolf Geese	GER	8440
M65 Decathlon	Emil Pawlik	USA	7900
M80 Decathlon	Pierre Darrot	FRA	6184
