= Masters So Cal Track and Field Championship =

- Sport: Masters track and field
- Founded: 1974; 52 years ago
- Country: United States
- Related competitions: USATF Masters Outdoor Championships
- Website: USATF Official website

The first Masters Southern California Track and Field Championships was held on June 1, 1974, at Sunny Hills High School in Fullerton. Masters class Track and Field had officially started in 1968 in nearby San Diego. Since its first annual meet, the Masters Southern California Track and Field Championships has been held every successive year except 2020, when the meet was cancelled due to the COVID-19 pandemic. Over the years, the meet has been organized under a succession of organizations: the Southern California Association of the Amateur Athletic Union (AAU), The Athletics Congress (TAC), and currently USA Track and Field (USATF).

== History of Masters So Cal ==
Through the efforts of David Pain, Masters Track and Field and its first Outdoor Track and Field Championship was founded in 1968. The Masters So Cal Outdoor Track and Field Championship competition was first held in June 1974. The 2019 meet included a complete set of running (sprints, middle distance, long distance, and relays), hurdles, steeplechase, racewalking, and field events (high jump, pole vault, long jump, triple jump, shot put, discus, hammer throw, and javelin).

Historically, many records have been produced at this meet. Tom Patsalis' M60 World Record in the long jump at Masters So Cal has stood since 1982. In total there are eight current Masters American Records that were set at this meet (see List of United States records in masters athletics).

The June 1975 meet included athletes Daniel Aldrich, Bryant Avery, Walt Butler, Ken Dennis, John Dobroth, Bill Fitzgerald, Pete Mundle, Nick Newton, Parry O'Brien (Olympian), Tom Patsalis, Paul Spangler, Art Vesco, and John Whittemore as competitors. The Los Angeles Times reported that Bill Fitzgerald set a M50 World Record in the mile at 4:37.1 and M50 American Record in the 880 yard at 2:07.2 at the meet. In June 1977 the LA Times stated, "Valley Track Club members Jerry Hackett of Canyon Country and Ernie Portillo of Canoga Park won divisions of the 880-yard run in the annual AAU District Masters Track and Field Championship.

The July 1980 National Masters Newsletter issue reports that the June 1980 meet produced four new records.

The Janes Elite Racing Club set a Masters American Record in the 4 × 800 m relay at the June 2018 meet.

== Olympians ==
The July 18, 1981, meet at University of California, Los Angeles featured Olympians John Carlos, Phil Conley, Tom Laris, Bill Toomey, Martha Watson, and Herm Wyatt.

Additional Olympians that have competed at the meet include Leon Coleman, Willie Gault, Larry Hart (athlete), Russ Hodge, Parry O'Brien, Steve Smith (pole vaulter), Larry Walker, Amy Acuff (5 time Olympian), Rosalyn Bryant Carter, Deby LaPlante Sweezey, and Pam Page.

In June 1992, Benny Brown, aged 38, competed in the Masters So Cal Track and Field Championship and won the M35 100 & 200 meter dash.

In 2004 visitors (non master) Carmelita Jeter won the 100 & 200 meter races and Khadevis Robinson won the 400.

== Notable Masters athletes ==
The SCA Championship has also seen its share of United States and World Masters Age Records, single age records, meet records, and stars during the meet, including Walt Butler, Todd Christensen, Robert Culling, Burl Gist, Bert de Groot, Kenny Dennis, John Dobroth, A. Redmond Doms, Bill Fitzgerald, Arnie Gaynor, Joe Greenberg, Dave Jackson, Carol Johnston, George Ker, Gunnar Linde, Leland McPhie, Gary Miller, Herb Miller, Peter Mundle, James Oleson, Tom Patsalis, Del Pickarts, Charlie Radar, Nolan Shaheed, Larry Stuart, Jack Thatcher, Clarence Trahan, Bob Watanabe, Stan Whitley, Leo Williams, Kathy Bergen, Adreana Cano, Linda Cohn, Sue Dimarco, Shirley Kinsey, Christel Donley (Miller), Rita Hanscom, Sue McDonald, Johnnye Valien, and Janet Wilson, among others.

Track Newsletter (published by Track & Field News) noted that Milan Tiff won the M30-34 TJ in 51'-11 3/4".

Visitor Senator Alan Cranston from Northern California won the M65 100 and 200 meter races at the 1980 meet.

== Meet dates and locations ==
Meet Dates and Locations:

- June 1, 1974 Sunny Hills HS, Fullerton, CA
- June 7, 1975 Sunny Hills HS, Fullerton, CA
- June 12, 1976 Moorpark College, Moorpark (Ventura County), CA
- June 11, 1977 Cal State Univ. Northridge, Northridge (Pent. At Southwestern College), CA
- June 11, 1978 Cal State Univ. Northridge, Northridge, CA
- June 10, 1979 Cal State Univ. Northridge, Northridge, CA
- June 7, 1980 Cal State Univ. Northridge, Northridge, CA
- July 18, 1981 UCLA, Los Angeles, CA
- July 10, 1982 UCLA, Los Angeles, CA
- July 9, 1983 Cal State Long Beach, Long Beach, CA
- July 1, 1984 Occidental College, Eagle Rock, CA
- June 1, 1985 Occidental College, Eagle Rock, CA
- June 28, 1986 Occidental College, Eagle Rock, CA
- June 20, 1987 Occidental College, Eagle Rock, CA
- June 18, 1988 Occidental College, Eagle Rock, CA
- June 18, 1989 Occidental College, Eagle Rock, CA
- June 16, 1990 Occidental College, Eagle Rock, CA
- June 15, 1991 Occidental College, Eagle Rock, CA
- June 20, 1992 Occidental College, Eagle Rock, CA
- June 27, 1993 Cerritos College, Norwalk, CA
- June 18, 1994 Occidental College, Eagle Rock, CA
- April 8, 1995 Occidental College, Eagle Rock, CA
- June 9, 1996 Cal State Long Beach, Long Beach, CA
- June 8, 1997 Occidental College, Eagle Rock, CA
- July 11, 1998 Fullerton College, Fullerton, CA
- June 12, 1999 Occidental College, Eagle Rock, CA
- June 24, 2000 Cal State Long Beach, Long Beach, CA
- August 4, 2001 Long Beach City College, Long Beach (HT at Cal State Long Beach), CA
- June 22, 2002 Birmingham High School, Van Nuys & Cal State Univ., Northridge, CA
- June 8, 2003 Orange Coast College, Costa Mesa, CA
- June 12, 2004 Cerritos College, Norwalk, CA
- June 11, 2005 West Los Angeles College, Culver City (PV at Culver City High), CA
- June 17, 2006 Moorpark College, Moorpark (Ventura County), CA
- June 9, 2007 Cal State Long Beach, Long Beach, CA
- June 14, 2008 Cerritos College, Norwalk, CA
- June 6, 2009 Soka Univ., Aliso Viejo, CA
- June 12, 2010 Orange Coast College, Costa Mesa, CA
- May 15, 2011 Long Beach City College (Throws: Long Beach State), CA
- June 16, 2012 Caltech, Pasadena, CA
- June 29, 2013 Caltech, Pasadena, CA
- May 17, 2014 Caltech, Pasadena, CA
- May 30, 2015 Cerritos College, Norwalk, CA
- May 28, 2016 Cerritos College, Norwalk, CA
- May 20, 2017 West Los Angeles College, Culver City, CA
- June 16, 2018 West Los Angeles College, Culver City, CA
- June 9, 2019 West Los Angeles College, Culver City, CA
- 2020 & 2021 Cancelled
- July 2, 2022 Pomona-Pitzer College, Claremont, CA
- June 3, 2023 Pomona-Pitzer College, Claremont, CA
- June 9, 2024 Moorpark College, Moorpark, CA
- June 7, 2025 Moorpark College, Moorpark, CA
- April 26, 2026 Cerritos College, Norwalk, CA

== USATF Southern California Association and Region ==
The USATF designated Southern California Association area (USATF SCA Association) counties include: Inyo, Los Angeles, Mono, Orange, Riverside, San Bernardino, San Luis Obispo, Santa Barbara, and Ventura. The SCA office falls under the West Region (AZ, CA, HI, NM, and NV). Association competition groups include Youth, (High School), (Collegiate), Open, Elite, Masters, and Para.

USATF Southern California Association has one of the largest population bases of any USATF sub-association.

== Additional Masters Track and Field Competitions ==
Southern California Masters Track and Field athletes have also competed at the following meets:

* The Olympics
- Masters World Track and Field Championship (started 1975)
- Pan Am Games (for Masters) (1977 to 1981)
- USATF Masters Outdoor Championships (1968 to Present)
- USATF Masters Indoor Championships (1975 to Present)
- Masters West Region Track and Field Championship (1975 to Present)
- Club West Masters meet (1974 to Present)
- Ben Brown meet (1990s to Present)
- Corona Del Mar Relays, (1970s to 1980s)
- Grandfather Games (Anteater, Dan Aldrich) (1971 to 2004)
- Huntsman World Senior Games (Utah)
- John Ward meet (Al Siddons; Orange) (1978 to 2014)
- Mt SAC Relays including Masters (1970s to Present).
- Orange County Senior Games (Irvine) (1970s to 1980s)
- Palm Desert Senior Games (Palm Springs) (1970s to 2024).
- Pasadena Senior Games (1992 to Present).
- Saddleback Masters Relays (200 to 2004)
- Senior Sports International Meet (LA Senior Games) (1970s to 1980s)
- Southern California Indoor Meet Outdoor (2006 to Present)
- Striders Meet of Champions hosted by the Southern California Striders (1975 to Present)
- SC Striders Meet
- Sri Chinmoy Self-Transcendence (1988 to Present)
- Trojan Masters meet (1980s to Present)

Additional competitions include cross country, marathons, road races, race walking, and Ultra.
