= Southern California Striders =

Track and field club in Los Angeles, California, United States

The Southern California Striders (also SoCal Striders or SC Striders) is a track and field athletics club based in Los Angeles, California. From its foundation in 1955 through the 1980s it was an elite club producing numerous national and Olympic champions. For a time in the 1970s it was called the Tobias Striders for sponsorship reasons. From the 1990s to 2006 the club was restricted to masters athletics and still produces national champions in older age classes. After 2006 it became a nonprofit open to all ages.

== History ==
The club was formed originally in the fall of 1955 by five elite athletes; Olympic multiple gold medalists Mal Whitfield, George Rhoden, silver medalist Meredith C."Flash" Gourdine, NCAA Champions Lang Stanley, and George Brown. In its day it laid claim to being "largest and strongest multiracial track-and-field club in the history of the sport." They were also called a collection "America’s finest Olympic Track and Field Stars."

Between 1957 and 1965 the team won 8 AAU National Team Championships by attracting a who's who of elite track athletes of the day. Among the people to wear the Striders uniform were: Rafer Johnson, Ralph Boston, Bill Toomey, Mike Larrabee, Bob Seagren John Rambo, John Smith, Fortune Gordien, Ronnie Ray Smith, Larry Stewart, Marshall Clark, Otis Burrell, Charles Dumas, Ed Caruthers, Bob Avant, Leon Coleman, Don Quarrie, Adolph Plummer, Chuck Smith, Ulis Williams, Rex Cawley, Wayne Collett, Ralph Mann, Ron Whitney, Geoff Vanderstock, Jim Cerveny, Jim Dupree, Jerome Walters, Bob Seaman, Paul Wilson, Ron Morris, Dick Railsback, John Pennel, Dave Volz, Art Walker, Parry O'Brien, Dallas Long, Peter Shmock Rink Babka, Ben Plucknett, Ed Burke, Hal Connolly Larry Young, Mike Manley and Max Truex. All (listed) were USA National Champions, most were also Olympians across the full range of disciplines in the sport. The last of these National Champions appears to be Ben Plucknett, winning his championship in 1981. Plucknett set the still standing United States record in the Discus while wearing the Southern California Striders uniform.

At the 1978 Sun Devil Relays, USC Trojans set a 4 × 200 m world record (1m 20.26s) despite losing to the Tobias Striders: the Striders' mark (1m 20.23s) was ineligible as a record because the team was of mixed nationality: Guy Abrahams (Panama), Michael Simmons (USA), Don Quarrie (Jamaica), and James Gilkes (Guyana). By 1980 Tobias Striders had absorbed Angel's Flight Striders and resumed the name SoCal Striders.

With the egalitarian attitude professed at its inception, the team catered almost exclusively to male athletes. This is because in the era of their successes, prior to Title IX, women athletes were not common and usually segregated.

The President of the Striders during the 60's was Dr. Jerry Bornstein, who put together a team of fellow doctors to provide medical care, and sometimes airline tickets, for the athletes out of their own pockets. Doctors Whitmore, Silver, Mels and Barnes and trainer Paul Schechter were part of this team. Now retired, Dr. Bornstein continues to be involved in sports medicine leading the team of athletic trainers at LAUSD sporting events.

Just as the team had the finest talent, it also attracted the finest coaches. Several people have laid claim to coaching the team. Charlie Coker joined in 1962. Joe Mangan also coached for the team. Later John Bork became the Coach and Athletic Director Other coaches and managers included Pete Petersons, Hank Erlich, Carl Ito, and Whitey Taylor.

The club continues today, primarily in Masters track and field, though some elite athletes continue to represent the team. The club now has a sizable female membership and the club's president for the better part of a decade was female Masters World Champion Brenda Matthews.

The club hosts an annual meet, the Southern California Striders Meet of Champions.

== Olympic accomplishments ==
- Mal Whitfield 5 Olympic Medals, 3 Gold
- Parry O'Brien 3 Olympic Medals, 2 Gold
- George Rhoden Jamaica 2 Gold Medals
- Mike Larrabee 2 Gold Medals
- Don Quarrie Jamaica 4 Olympic Medals, 1 Gold
- Ralph Boston 3 Olympic Medals, 1 Gold
- Rafer Johnson 2 Olympic Medals, 1 Gold
- Bob Seagren 2 Olympic Medals, 1 Gold
- Dallas Long 2 Olympic Medals, 1 Gold
- Rex Cawley 1 Olympic Gold Medal
- Hal Connolly 1 Olympic Gold Medal
- Charles Dumas 1 Olympic Gold Medal
- Bill Toomey 1 Olympic Gold Medal
- Ulis Williams 1 Olympic Gold Medal
- Ronnie Ray Smith 1 Olympic Gold Medal
- Fortune Gordien 2 Olympic Medals
- Larry Young 2 Olympic Medals
- Rink Babka 1 Olympic Medal
- Ed Caruthers 1 Olympic Medal
- Wayne Collett 1 Olympic Medal
- Meredith "Flash" Gourdine 1 Olympic Medal
- Ralph Mann 1 Olympic Medal
- Ron Morris 1 Olympic Medal
- John Rambo 1 Olympic Medal

== Other Olympics activities ==
- Dick Van Kirk-Vice President, Technology, 1984 Summer Olympics

== USA Masters Track and Field Championship ==
1. USATF Masters Outdoor Championships 2. USATF Masters Indoor Championships 3. Masters So Cal Track and Field Championship

== Resources ==
1. USATF website 2. USATF Masters website 3. World Masters Athletics (WMA) 4. SCA USATF 5. Mastershistory.org website: 6. National Masters News magazine 7. World Masters Rankings 8. North and Central America and Caribbean Region of World Masters Athletics (NCCMA) 9. Southern California Striders 10. Club West track club 11. List of USA Masters Track and Field Records List of United States records in masters athletics 12. Mastersrankings
