= Masters W70 100 metres world record progression =

This is the progression of world record improvements of the 100 metres W80 division of Masters athletics.

Key

Incomplete information Wind aided Pending

Hand	Auto	Wind	Athlete	Nationality	Birthdate	Age	Location	Date	Ref
	14.37	(−0.6 m/s)	Sara Montecinos	Chile	8 March 1954	71 years, 261 days	Santiago	24 November 2025	
	14.44	(+1.2 m/s)	Wendy Alexis	Canada	25 March 1955	70 years, 120 days	Ottawa	23 July 2025	
	14.54	(+0.5 m/s)	Wendy Alexis	Canada	25 March 1955	70 years, 108 days	Ottawa	11 July 2025	
	14.64	(+0.2 m/s)	Wendy Alexis	Canada	25 March 1955	70 years, 78 days	Ottawa	11 June 2025	
	14.70	(−0.6 m/s)	Karla del Grande	Canada	27 March 1953	71 years, 109 days	Hamilton	14 July 2024	
	14.54	(±0.0 m/s)	Sara Montecinos	Chile	8 March 1954	70 years, 92 days	Santiago	8 June 2024	
	14.73	(+1.4 m/s)	Ingrid Meier	Germany	1 April 1947	70 years, 90 days	Zittau	30 June 2017	
	14.76	(−0.3 m/s)	Kathy Bergen	United States	24 December 1939	70 years, 114 days	Walnut	17 April 2010	
	14.60	(+2.2 m/s)	Kathy Bergen	United States	24 December 1939	70 years, 108 days	Santa Ana	11 April 2010	
	15.16	(+0.6 m/s)	Margaret Peters	New Zealand	18 October 1933	70 years, 155 days	Auckland	21 March 2004	
	15.33	(+0.3 m/s)	Paula Schneiderhan	Germany	16 November 1921	72 years, 313 days	Weinstadt	25 September 1994	
	15.42 (Note: Final time, spelled Pauline in the results)	(+1.2 m/s)	Paula Schneiderhan	Germany	16 November 1921	71 years, 333 days	Miyazaki	15 October 1993	
	15.59 (Note: Semi-final time, spelled Pauline in the results)	(+1.2 m/s)	Paula Schneiderhan	Germany	16 November 1921	71 years, 333 days	Miyazaki	15 October 1993	
	16.09 (Note: Final time, finished 2nd to Paula Schneiderhan)	(+1.2 m/s)	Anna Mangler	Germany	14 January 1923	70 years, 274 days	Miyazaki	15 October 1993	
15.9 h			Winifred Audrey Reid	South Africa	1915	70	Germiston	25 May 1985	
	16.26		Polly Clarke	United States	17 July 1910	72 years, 20 days	Wichita	6 August 1982	
