= Masters W80 100 metres world record progression =

This is the progression of world record improvements of the 100 metres W80 division of Masters athletics.

Key

Incomplete information Wind aided Pending

Time	Wind	Athlete	Nationality	Birthdate	Age	Location	Date
16.23	+1.6	Carol LaFayette-Boyd	Canada	17 May 1942	80 years, 74 days	Regina	30 July 2022
16.23	+1.3	Kathy Bergen	United States	24 December 1939	81 years, 269 days	San Diego	19 September 2021
16.26	+0.7	Kathy Bergen	United States	24 December 1939	81 years, 164 days	Santa Ana	6 June 2021
16.62	+1.8	Kathy Bergen	United States	24 December 1939	80 years, 284 days	Marble Falls	3 October 2020
16.81	+0.5	Irene Obera	United States	7 December 1933	80 years, 224 days	Winston-Salem	19 July 2014
17.07	-0.1	Irene Obera	United States	7 December 1933	80 years, 154 days	San Mateo	10 May 2014
17.94	+3.5	Mary Bowermaster	United States	26 July 1917	81 years, 16 days	Eugene	11 August 1998
18.41	+1.0	Johanna Gelbrich	Germany	19 January 1913	80 years, 269 days	Miyazaki	15 October 1993
18.10		Polly Clarke	United States	17 July 1910	80 years, 16 days	Indianapolis	2 August 1990
