= Jack Ryan (runner) =

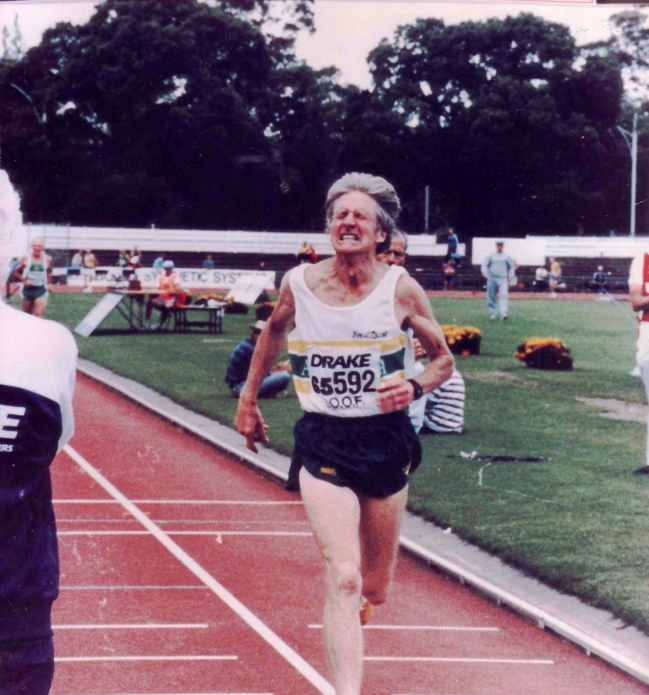
- Ryan at the VII World Veterans' Games

Personal information
- Nationality: Australian
- Born: 30 April 1922; Romsey, Victoria
- Died: 16 November 2016 (aged 94); Melbourne, Victoria

Sport
- Sport: Athletics
- Event: 1500 – 10,000 m

John "Jack" George Ryan (30 April 1922 – 16 November 2016) was an Australian masters long-distance runner. After reading Aerobics by Kenneth H. Cooper at age 46, Ryan took up jogging and competed in his first race at 50. Two years later he became the M50 1500 m world record holder. He went on to set masters world records in the 1500–10,000 m for the M50, M55 and M65 categories. At the 1987 Melbourne VII World Veterans' Games, Ryan won the M65 800 m, 1500 m, mile and 5000 m, setting world records in the 1500 – 5000 m.
