= Masters W75 100 metres world record progression =

This is the progression of world record improvements of the 100 metres W75 division of Masters athletics.

Key

Incomplete information Wind aided Pending

Hand	Auto	Wind	Athlete	Nationality	Birthdate	Location	Date	Ref.
	15.15	+0.6	Carol LaFayette-Boyd	Canada	17.05.1942	Regina	10.06.2017	
	15.31	+1.4	Kathy Bergen	United States	24.12.1939	Walnut	18.04.2015	
	15.78		Ann Cooper	Australia	07.12.1928	Adelaide	07.03.2007	
	15.82	+0.7	Christa Bortignon	Canada	29.01.1937	Kamloops	21.08.2013	
	16.09	0.1	Ann Cooper	Australia	07.12.1928	Brisbane	26.03.2005	
	15.91	0.0	Paula Schneiderhan	Germany	16.11.1921	Emmendingen	06.09.1997	
	16.87		Polly Clarke	United States	17.07.1910		31.08.1985	
	17.08		Polly Clarke	United States	17.07.1910	Indianapolis	23.08.1985	
	17.26	-1.2	Gunni Svensson	Sweden	17.11.1920	Malmö	21.07.1996	
