= Masters M60 long jump world record progression =

This is the progression of world record improvements of the long jump M60 division of Masters athletics.

Key

Incomplete information Pending

Distance	Wind	Athlete	Nationality	Birthdate	Age	Location	Date	Ref
6.18 m	(+2.0 m/s)	Gianni Becatti	Italy	27 August 1963	61 years, 11 days	Pietrasanta	7 September 2024	
6.07 m	NWI	Tom Patsalis	United States	6 December 1921	60 years, 216 days	Los Angeles	10 July 1982	
5.44 m	NWI	Hans Bittner	Germany	22 February 1920	61 years, 69 days	Gaggenau	2 May 1981	
5.39 m	NWI	Hans Schneider	Germany					
