= Masters M60 triple jump world record progression =

This is the progression of world record improvements of the triple jump M60 division of Masters athletics.

Key

Incomplete information Pending Indoor mark before 2000, not acceptable for record

Distance	Wind (m/s)	Athlete	Nationality	Birthdate	Age	Location	Date	Ref
12.82 m	(+0.2 m/s)	Wolfgang Knabe	Germany	12 July 1959	61 years, 363 days	Garbsen	10 July 2021	
12.68 m	(+1.6 m/s)	Stig Bäcklund	Finland	27 October 1939	60 years, 235 days	Kajaani	18 June 2000	
12.33 m	(+0.3 m/s)	Pericles Pinto	Portugal	15 February 1937	60 years, 158 days	Durban	23 July 1997	
12.33 m	(+0.5 m/s)	Hermann Strauss	Germany	6 March 1931	60 years, 142 days	Turku	26 July 1991	
12.13 m i		Amelio Compri	Italy	31 January 1925	60 years, 37 days	Turin	9 March 1985	
12.01 m	NWI	Jakob Rypdal	Norway	19 February 1926	61 years, 289 days	Melbourne	5 December 1987	
12.01 m	NWI	Vaclav Bartl	Sweden	5 March 1926	61 years, 275 days	Melbourne	5 December 1987	
11.96 m	NWI	Tom Patsalis	United States	6 December 1931	50 years, 216 days	Los Angeles	10 July 1982	
