= Masters W60 800 metres world record progression =

This is the progression of world record improvements of the 800 metres W60 division of Masters athletics.

Key

Incomplete information Pending

Hand	Auto	Athlete	Nationality	Birthdate	Age	Location	Date	Ref
	2:22.52	Sue McDonald	United States	29 March 1963	60 years, 38 days	Los Angeles	6 May 2023	
	2:31.51	Yvonne Crilly	Great Britain	15 November 1961	60 years, 258 days	Nuneaton	31 July 2022	
	2:33.09	Lidia Zentner	Germany	27 March 1953	60 years, 171 days	Bar le Duc	14 September 2013	
	2:33.96	Jeanette Flynn	Australia	1 November 1951	61 years, 290 days	St. Lucia	18 August 2013	
	2:34.04	Lidia Zentner	Germany	27 March 1953	60 years, 133 days	Pfungstadt	7 August 2013	
	2:34.66	Sabra Harvey	United States	2 March 1949	60 years, 129 days	Oshkosh	9 July 2009	
	2:36.03	Agnes Hitchmough	Great Britain	15 May 1950	61 years, 42 days	Birmingham	26 June 2011	
	2:36.94	Gerda van Kooten	Netherlands	1 April 1939	60 years, 124 days	Gateshead	3 August 1999	
	2:41.01	Jeanne Hoagland	United States	1937	60	Durban	22 July 1997	
	2:45.03	Jofrid Jansen	Norway	13 December 1935	60 years, 226 days	Malmö	26 July 1996	
	2:46.20	Vicki Bigelow	United States	22 July 1935	60 years, 14 days	Buffalo	5 August 1995	
	2:51.27	Jean Horne	Canada	20 October 1932	60 years, 360 days	Miyazaki	15 October 1993	
