= Masters W65 high jump world record progression =

This is the progression of world record improvements of the high jump W65 division of Masters athletics.

Key

Incomplete information Pending

Height	Athlete	Nationality	Birthdate	Location	Date
1.37	Ursula Stelling	Germany	23.05.1941	Poznań	23.07.2006
1.35	Kathy Bergen	United States	24.12.1939	Long Beach	20.05.2006
1.34	Evelyn Wright	United States	17.03.1937	Las Vegas	10.04.2003
1.27A	Leonore McDaniels	United States	06.03.1928	Provo	11.08.1993
1.22	Gwen Davidson	Australia	28.11.1922	Melbourne	01.12.1987
