= Masters W65 long jump world record progression =

This is the progression of world record improvements of the long jump W65 division of Masters athletics.

Key

Incomplete information Pending

Distance	Wind	Athlete	Nationality	Birthdate	Location	Date
4.64	0.8	Christiane Schmalbruch	Germany	08.01.1937	Potsdam	16.08.2002
4.47		Paula Schneiderhan	Germany	16.11.1921	Melbourne	01.12.1987
