= Masters W50 10000 metres world record progression =

This is the progression of world record improvements of the 10000 metres W50 division of Masters athletics.

Key

Incomplete information Pending

Hand	Auto	Athlete	Nationality	Birthdate	Location	Date
	35:05.7	Fiona Matheson	United Kingdom	25.04.1961	Coatbridge	16.10.2011
35:41.9		Gitte Karlshøj	Denmark	14.05.1959	Arhus	25.08.2009
36:31.5		Beverley "Bev" Lucas	Australia	13.10.1946	Adelaide	29.01.1997
	36:51.28	Ursula Odermatt	Switzerland	10.10.1939	Miyazaki	07.10.1993
36:51.5		Edeltraud Pohl	Germany	14.07.1936	Leverkusen	13.08.1988
