= Masters W60 discus world record progression =

Masters W60 discus world record progression is the progression of world record improvements of the discus W60 division of Masters athletics. Records must be set in properly conducted, official competitions under the standing IAAF rules unless modified by World Masters Athletics. The W60 division consists of female athletes who have reached the age of 60 but have not yet reached the age of 65, so exactly from their 60th birthday to the day before their 65th birthday. The W60 division throws exactly the same 1 kg implement as the Open division.

Key

Incomplete information Pending

Distance	Athlete	Nationality	Birthdate	Location	Date
39.24	Karin Illgen	Germany	07.04.1941	Halle	15.06.2002
39.08	Anne Chatrine Rühlow	Germany	30.09.1936	Osnabrück	04.07.1997
38.64	Zsuzsa Serédi Wissinger	Germany	07.02.1934	Stuttgart	18.06.1995
37.56	Rosemary Chrimes	United Kingdom	19.05.1933	Miyazaki	11.10.1993
32.54	Nina Ponomareva Romashkova	Ukraine	27.04.1929	Kristiansand	1992
