= Masters W75 triple jump world record progression =

This is the progression of world record improvements of the triple jump W75 division of Masters athletics.

Key

Incomplete information Pending Wind aided

Distance	Wind	Athlete	Nationality	Birthdate	Age	Location	Date	Ref
8.48 m	(+1.5 m/s)	Akiko Ohinata	Japan	14 December 1949	75 years, 253 days	Fukui City	24 August 2025	
8.46 m i		Carol LaFayette-Boyd	Canada	17 May 1942	75 years, 249 days	Edmonton	21 January 2018	
8.19 m	(+0.4 m/s)	Carol LaFayette-Boyd	Canada	17 May 1942	75 years, 24 days	Regina	10 June 2017	
8.11 m	(+0.4 m/s)	Christa Bortignon	Canada	29 January 1937	75 years, 255 days	St. George	10 October 2012	
7.88 m	(+1.3 m/s)	Audrey Lary	United States	9 May 1934	75 years, 88 days	Palo Alto	5 August 2009	
7.13 m	(±0.0 m/s)	Elsa Enarsson	Sweden	30 August 1930	75 years, 2 days	San Sebastián	1 September 2005	
6.97 m	(−1.3 m/s)	Leonore McDaniels	United States	6 March 1928	75 years, 57 days	Raleigh	2 May 2003	
6.50 m	NWI	Kazue Fugivara	Brazil	22 March 1927	76 years, 40 days	São Paulo	1 May 2003	
6.30 m	(+1.8 m/s)	Johnnye Valien	United States	24 July 1925	76 years, 4 days	Baton Rouge	28 July 2001	
6.31 m	NWI	Mary Patridge	Australia	11 February 1921	75 years, 43 days	Sydney	25 March 1996	
