= Masters W80 triple jump world record progression =

This is the progression of world record improvements of the triple jump W80 division of Masters athletics.

Key

Incomplete information Pending Wind aided Better indoor mark

Distance	Wind	Athlete	Nationality	Birthdate	Age	Location	Date
7.66 m i		Carol LaFayette-Boyd	Canada	17 May 1942	80 years, 262 days	Regina	3 February 2023
7.45 m	-3.0	Carol LaFayette-Boyd	Canada	17 May 1942	80 years, 61 days	Saskatoon	17 July 2022
7.57 m i		Rietje Dijkman	Netherlands	21 June 1939	82 years, 247 days	Braga	23 February 2022
7.37 m	+1.3	Rietje Dijkman	Netherlands	21 June 1939	80 years, 76 days	Caorle	5 September 2019
7.42 m i		Christa Bortignon	Canada	29 January 1937	80 years, 62 days	Kamloops	1 April 2017
7.36 m	+1.6	Christiane Schmalbruch	Germany	8 January 1937	80 years, 153 days	Rostock	10 June 2017
7.16 m	0.0	Christa Bortignon	Canada	29 January 1937	80 years, 108 days	Kamloops	17 May 2017
6.55 m	-0.9	Elsa Enarsson	Sweden	30 August 1930	80 years, 12 days	Olofström	11 September 2010
5.65 m	+0.3	Ruth Frith	Australia	23 August 1909	84 years, 51 days	Miyazaki	13 October 1993
