= Miniestadio de Anoeta =

Sports stadium in San Sebastián, Spain

Coordinates: 43.29965°N 1.97585°W

Mini Estadio de Anoeta
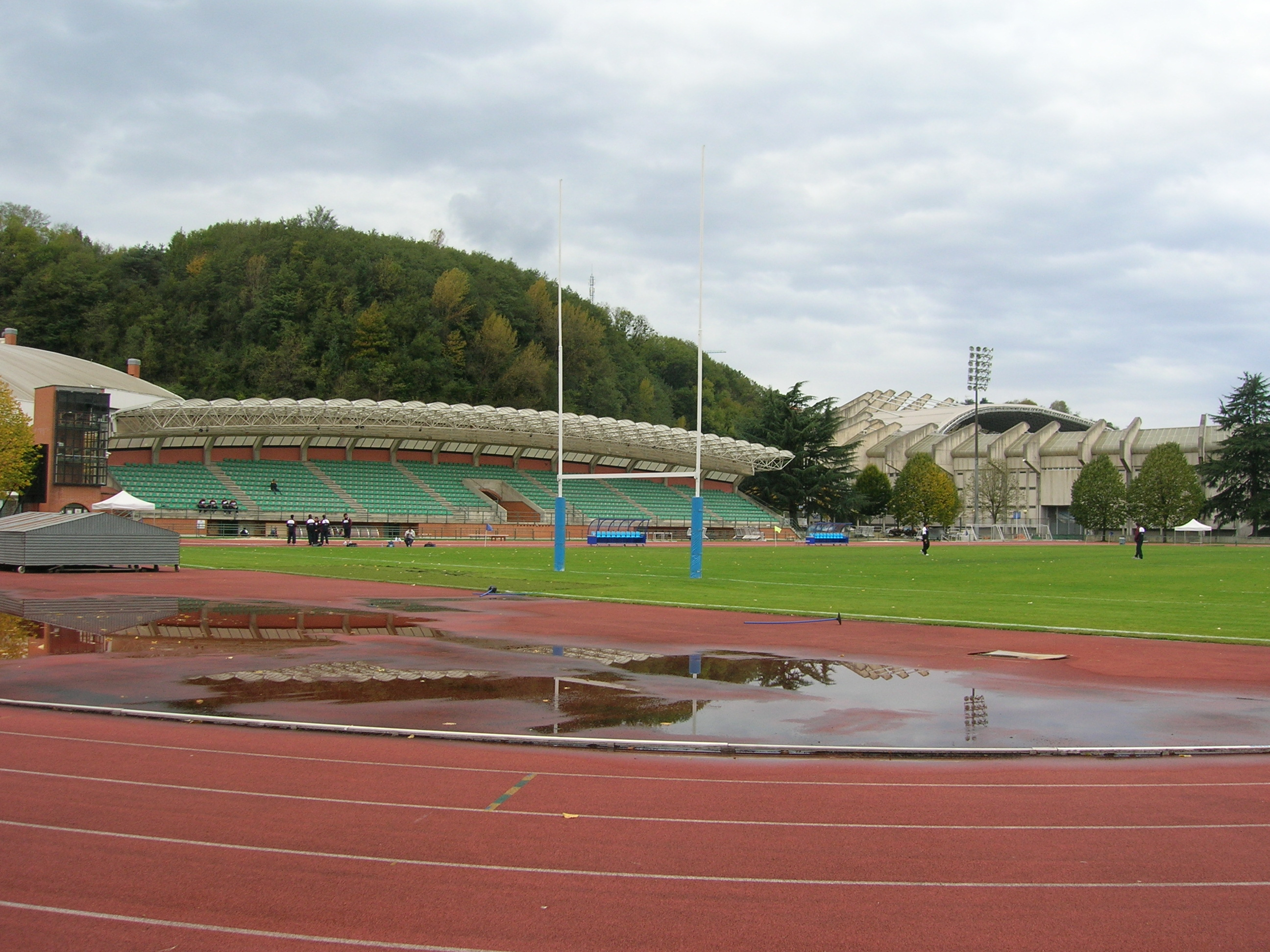
- Interactive map of Mini Estadio de Anoeta
- Location: San Sebastián, Basque Country, Spain
- Owner: San Sebastián city council
- Capacity: 1,262
- Surface: natural grass
- Field size: 96 x 64 m

Construction
- Opened: 1993

Tenants
- Bera Bera RT; Basque Korsarioak

Miniestadio de Anoeta, known also as Estadio Kote Olaizola, is a sports stadium near to the Anoeta stadium, in San Sebastián. It is usually used for athletics events. and for trainings. The central pitch, whose surface is natural grass, is occasionally used for football and habitually used for rugby union matches of Bera Bera RT in División de Honor.

The stadium has a main stand with a capacity of 1,262 spectators, a 400m long running track, a 500m long warm-up track, a gym and two multi-purpose rooms

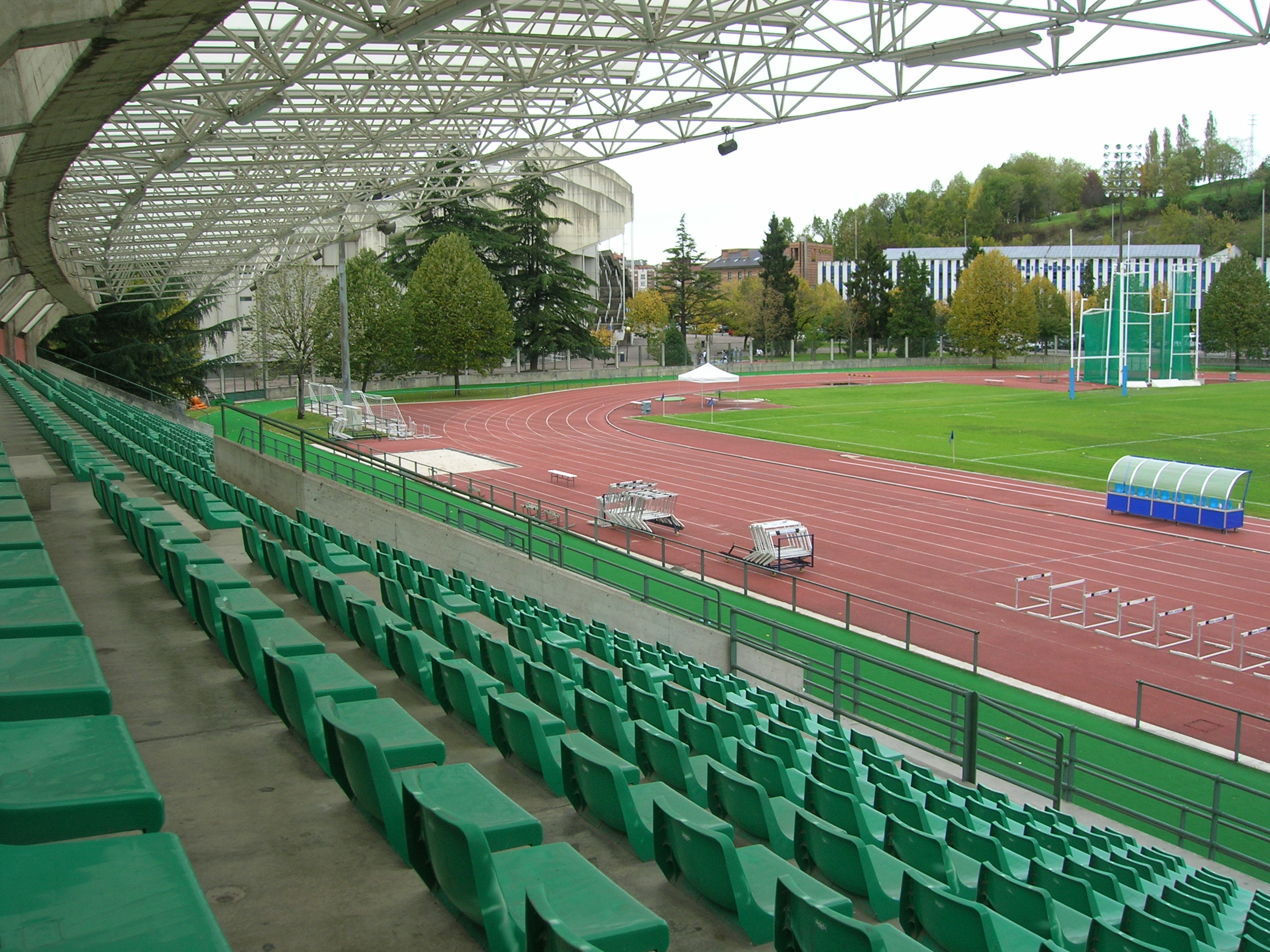
Main stand of Miniestadio
