= Masters M80 200 metres world record progression =

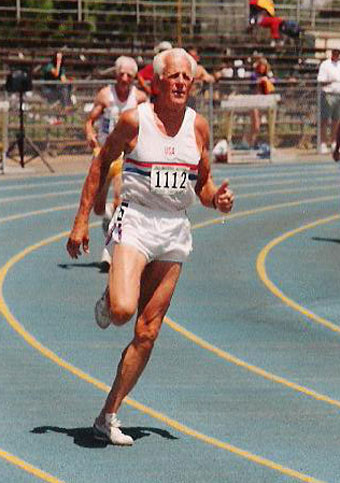
Former U.S. Olympic coach Payton Jordan of California sets a world record (30.89 seconds) in the M80 age group in the 200-meter dash at the USATF National Masters Championships in 1997 in San Jose, California.

This is the progression of world record improvements of the 200 metres M80 division of Masters athletics.

Key

Incomplete information Wind aided Pending better indoor records

Hand	Auto	Wind	Athlete	Nationality	Birthdate	Age	Location	Date	Ref
	29.49	(+0.3 m/s)	Kenton Brown	United States	3 September 1944	81 years, 34 days	St. George	7 October 2025	
	29.15 i		Robert Lida	United States	11 November 1936	80 years, 132 days	Daegu	23 March 2017	
	29.54	(−0.5 m/s)	Hijiya Hisamitsu	Japan	1 September 1931	81 years, 8 days	Miyazaki	9 September 2012	
	30.44	(+2.8 m/s)	Hiroo Tanaka	Japan	8 December 1930	81 years, 185 days	Hokkaido	10 June 2012	
	30.81		Yoshiyuki Shimizu	Brazil	14 July 1928	80 years, 33 days	São Paulo	16 August 2008	
	30.89	(−0.6 m/s)	Payton Jordan	United States	19 March 1917	80 years, 144 days	San Jose	10 August 1997	
	31.08	(+0.3 m/s)	Fritz Assmy	Germany	11 June 1915	80 years, 70 days	Minden	20 August 1995	
	32.14	w	Harry Gathercole	Australia	7 June 1907	80 years, 175 days	Melbourne	29 November 1987	
32.9 h			Josiah Packard	United States	15 December 1903	80 years, 65 days	San Francisco	18 February 1984	
