= Masters W50 300 metres hurdles world record progression =

This is the progression of world record improvements of the 300 metres hurdles W50 division of Masters athletics.

Key

Incomplete information Pending

| Hand | Auto | Athlete | Nationality | Birthdate | Location | Date |
|---|---|---|---|---|---|---|
| | 44.90 | Barbara Gähling | Germany | 20.01.1965 | Lyon | 12.08.2015 |
| | 45.05 | Christine Müller | Switzerland | 22.07.1958 | Ljubljana | 27.07.2008 |
| 45.8 | | Jan Hynes | Australia | 03.04.1944 | Brisbane | 03.09.1994 |
| | 48.43 | Marjorie Hocknell | United Kingdom | 15.11.1943 | Athens | 04.06.1994 |
| | 49.78 | Brenda Parkinson | Australia | 01.02.1937 | Melbourne | 04.12.1987 |
| | 52.01 | Pirkko Martin | Finland | 16.07.1936 | Melbourne | 29.11.1987 |
