= Masters W80 pole vault world record progression =

This is the progression of world record improvements of the pole vault W75 division of Masters athletics.

Key

Incomplete information Pending Indoor mark
IAAF includes indoor marks in the record list since 2000, but WMA does not follow that practice.

Height	Athlete	Nationality	Birthdate	Age	Location	Date	Ref
1.83 m	Florence Meiler	United States	1 June 1934	80 years, 20 days	Albany	21 June 2014	
1.65 m	Florence Meiler	United States	1 June 1934	80 years, 46 days	Winston-Salem	17 July 2014	
1.43 m i	Christa Happ	Germany	25 December 1929	81 years, 81 days	Ghent	16 March 2011	
1.40 m	Christa Happ	Germany	25 December 1929	80 years, 208 days	Nyíregyháza	21 July 2010	
1.40 m	Johnnye Valien	United States	24 July 1925	80 years, 36 days	San Sebastian	29 August 2005	
1.40 m	Johnnye Valien	United States	24 July 1925	80 years, 13 days	Honolulu	6 August 2005	
