= Masters M85 1500 metres world record progression =

This is the progression of world record improvements of the 1500 metres M85 division of Masters athletics.

Key

Incomplete information Pending Better indoor record

Hand	Auto	Athlete	Nationality	Birthdate	Age	Location	Date	Ref
	6:08.47 i	Jean-Louis Esnault	France	19 January 1940	85 years, 69 days	Gainesville	29 March 2025	
	6:08.61	Manuel Alonso Domingo	Spain	21 March 1936	85 years, 90 days	Málaga	19 June 2021	
	6:18.66	Manuel Alonso Domingo	Spain	21 March 1936	85 years, 41 days	Arganda del Rey	1 May 2021	
6:27.3 h		David Carr	Australia	15 June 1932	85 years, 0 days	Perth	15 June 2017	
	6:38.23	Ed Whitlock	Canada	6 March 1931	85 years, 160 days	Toronto	13 August 2016	
	6:37.75	Francisco do Carmo Oliveira	Brazil	8 June 1927	86 years, 140 days	Porto Alegre	26 October 2013	
	6:51.32	Yoshimitsu Miyauchi	Japan	20 July 1924	85 years, 62 days	Kagoshima	20 September 2009	
	6:38.42	Antonio Tejada Vergara	Mexico	11 April 1921	85 years, 135 days	Guatemala City	24 August 2006	
	7:03.38	Longino Perez	Mexico	20 February 1902	85 years, 288 days	Melbourne	5 December 1987	
7:29.4 h		Josef Galia	Germany	1 February 1898	87 years, 215 days	Sankt Augustin	4 September 1985	
	8:09.07	Paul Spangler	United States	18 March 1899	86 years, 26 days	Fresno	13 April 1985	
