= Masters W40 400 metres hurdles world record progression =

This is the progression of world record improvements of the 400 metres hurdles W40 division of Masters athletics.

Key

Incomplete information Pending

Hand	Auto	Athlete	Nationality	Birthdate	Age	Location	Date	Ref
	58.35	Barbara Gähling	Germany	20 January 1965	42 years, 182 days	Erfurt	21 July 2007	
58.3 h		Gowry Retchakan Hodge	Great Britain	21 June 1960	40 years, 74 days	Hoo	3 September 2000	
	1:02.08	Maria Jesus Sanguos	Spain	08.01.1955	Pontevedra	22.06.1995		
	1:02.80	Jan Hynes	Australia	03.04.1944		1987		
1:02.7		Karin Von Riewel	Germany	09.12.1948	Willich	14.06.1990		
	1:03.58	Jan Hynes	Australia	03.04.1944	Melbourne	05.12.1987		
