= Masters W85 800 metres world record progression =

This is the progression of world record improvements of the 800 metres W85 division of Masters athletics.

Key

Incomplete information Pending Better indoor records

Hand	Auto	Athlete	Nationality	Birthdate	Age	Location	Date	Ref
	3:36.14	Yolande Marchal	France	10 September 1939	85 years, 262 days	Cannes	30 May 2025	
	3:58.15	Yoko Nakano	Japan	1 December 1935	85 years, 326 days	Tokyo	23 October 2021	
	4:09.58 i	Melitta Czerwenka-Nagel	Germany	30 April 1930	85 years, 336 days	Ancona	31 March 2016	
	4:15.99	Melitta Czerwenka-Nagel	Germany	30 April 1930	85 years, 101 days	Lyon	9 August 2015	
	4:56.10	Vladylena Kokina	Russia	13 October 1926	85 years, 316 days	Littau	24 August 2012	
	4:44.68	Margaret Prowse	Australia	13 July 1920	88 years, 258 days	Melbourne	28 March 2009	
	5:00.58	Rosario Iglesias Rocha	Mexico	20 September 1910	86 years, 305 days	Durban	22 July 1997	
	5:14.43	Matsue Nishiyama	Japan	7 March 1907	86 years, 222 days	Miyazaki	15 October 1993	
