= Masters M45 10000 metres world record progression =

This is the progression of world record improvements of the 10000 metres M45 division of Masters athletics.

Key

Incomplete information Pending

Hand	Auto	Athlete	Nationality	Birthdate	Age	Location	Date	Ref
	29:39.43	Mustafa Mohamed	Sweden	1 March 1979	45 years, 148 days	Uddevalla	27 July 2024	
	29:44.38	Kevin Castille	United States	17 March 1972	45 years, 0 days	LaFayette	17 March 2017	
	30:02.56	Antonio Villanueva	Mexico	25 July 1940	47 years, 127 days	Melbourne	29 November 1987	
30:16.8		Alain Mimoun	France	1 January 1921	45 years, 167 days	Paris	17.06.1966	
