= Masters W50 80 metres hurdles world record progression =

This is the progression of world record improvements of the 80 metres hurdles W50 division of Masters athletics.

Key

Incomplete information Wind aided Pending

Hand	Auto	Wind	Athlete	Nationality	Birthdate	Location	Date
	12.08	2.0	Christine Müller	Switzerland	22.07.1958	Vaterstetten	10.07.2009
	12.21	0.0	Christine Müller	Switzerland	22.07.1958	Zurich	28.06.2009
	12.23	-1.0	Christine Müller	Switzerland	22.07.1958	Ljubljana	24.07.2008
	12.54	>2.0	Corrie Roovers	Netherlands	14.07.1935	Melbourne	29.11.1987
	13.02	0.0	Corrie Roovers	Netherlands	14.07.1935	Melbourne	28.11.1987
	13.07		Wanda Dos Santos	Brazil	01.06.1932	São Paulo	1985
