= Masters M75 300 metres hurdles world record progression =

This is the progression of world record improvements of the 300 metres hurdles M75 division of Masters athletics.

Key

Incomplete information Pending

Hand	Auto	Athlete	Nationality	Birthdate	Location	Date
	49.65	Guido Müller	Germany	22.12.1938	Erfurt	12.07.2014
	52.91	Earl Fee	Canada	22.03.1929	San Sebastian	26.08.2005
	53.15	James Stookey	United States	20.01.1930	Honolulu	04.08.2005
53.4		Albertus Van Zyl	South Africa	13.08.1922	Bloemfontein	10.10.1998
54.7		Albertus Van Zyl	South Africa	13.08.1922		01.05.1998
	55.33	Daniel Bulkley	United States	04.05.1917	Brisbane	02.10.1994
	67.75	Omar His	United States	Uniondale	19.07.1986	
