= Masters M85 high jump world record progression =

This is the progression of world record improvements of the high jump M85 division of Masters athletics.

Key

Incomplete information Pending

Height	Athlete	Nationality	Birthdate	Location	Date
1.22	Emmerich Zensch	Austria	20.12.1919	San Sebastián	25.08.2005
1.22	Emmerich Zensch	Austria	20.12.1919	Edmonton	27.07.2005
1.20	Kizo Kimura	Japan	11.07.1911	Kofu	22.06.1997
1.13	Buell Crane	United States	18.03.1900		26.07.1985
