= Masters M50 long jump world record progression =

World record improvements for men over 50

This is the progression of world record improvements of the long jump M50 division of Masters athletics.

Key

Incomplete information Pending

| Distance | Wind | Athlete | Nationality | Birthdate | Location | Date |
|---|---|---|---|---|---|---|
| 6.84 | 1.7 | Tapani Taavitsainen | Finland | 17.06.1944 | Geneva | 18.06.1994 |
| 6.66 | | Stig Bäcklund | Finland | 27.10.1939 | Budapest | 30.06.1990 |
| 6.54 | | Pericles Pinto | Portugal | 15.02.1937 | Melbourne | 04.12.1987 |
| 6.45 | | Hermann Strauss | Germany | 06.03.1931 | Würzburg | 09.05.1981 |
| 6.42 | | Shirley Davisson | United States | 18.02.1930 | Victorville | 12.04.1980 |
| 6.23 | | Richmond "Boo" Morcom | United States | 01.05.1921 | Los Angeles | 17.06.1972 |
