= Masters W60 1500 metres world record progression =

This is the progression of world record improvements of the 1500 metres W60 division of Masters athletics.

Key

Incomplete information Pending

Hand	Auto	Athlete	Nationality	Birthdate	Age	Location	Date	Ref
	4:56.85	Clare Elms	Great Britain	26 December 1963	61 years, 222 days	Tonbridge	5 August 2025	
	4:57.14	Clare Elms	Great Britain	26 December 1963	60 years, 249 days	Tooting Bec	31 August 2024	
	4:59.45	Anne Gilshinan	Ireland	1964	60	Gothenburg	24 August 2024	
	5:02.38	Sue McDonald	United States	29 March 1963	60 years, 192 days	Las Vegas	7 October 2023	
	5:04.27	Sue McDonald	United States	29 March 1963	60 years, 66 days	Claremont	3 June 2023	
	5:06.65	Lidia Zentner	Germany	27 March 1953	60 years, 178 days	Helmsheim	21 September 2013	
	5:12.27	Sabra Harvey	United States	2 March 1949	61 years, 142 days	Sacramento	22 July 2010	
	5:18.14	Corrie Keijsers	Netherlands	15 March 1942	60 years, 93 days	Weert	16 June 2002	
	5:24.72	Gerda van Kooten	Netherlands	1 April 1939	60 years, 128 days	Gateshead	7 August 1999	
	5:34.04	Edeltraud Pohl	Germany	14 July 1936	60 years, 5 days	Malmö	19 July 1996	
5:36.0		Jean Albury	Australia	28 September 1929	60 years, 185 days	Melbourne	1 April 1990	
	5:44.81	Shirley Brasher	Australia	6 November 1926	61 years, 29 days	Melbourne	5 December 1987	
