= Masters M85 400 metres world record progression =

This is the progression of world record improvements of the 400 metres M85 division of Masters athletics.

Key

Incomplete information Pending

Hand	Auto	Athlete	Nationality	Birthdate	Location	Date
	1:19.04	Earl Fee	Canada	22.03.1929	Raleigh	07.06.2014
	1:20.46	Yoshiyuki Shimizu	Brazil	14.07.1928	Porto Alegre	26.10.2013
	1:20.47	Lucas Nel	South Africa	20.07.1923	Sydney	11.10.2009
	1:24.18	Roderick Parker	United States	09.11.1918	Decatur	06.08.2004
	1:27.11	Herbert Liedtke	Sweden	29.04.1916	Eskilstuna	19.08.2001
1:28.3		Giichi Suda	Japan	16.09.1912	Machida	1998
	1:31.54	Longino Perez	Mexico	20.02.1902	Melbourne	05.12.1987
