= Masters W60 shot put world record progression =

Masters W60 shot put world record progression is the progression of world record improvements of the shot put W60 division of Masters athletics. Records must be set in properly conducted, official competitions under the standing IAAF rules unless modified by World Masters Athletics. The W60 division consists of female athletes who have reached the age of 60 but have not yet reached the age of 65, so exactly from their 60th birthday to the day before their 65th birthday. The W60 division throws a 3 kg implement.

Key

Incomplete information Pending Indoor mark before 2000, not acceptable for record

| Distance | Athlete | Nationality | Birthdate | Location | Date |
|---|---|---|---|---|---|
| 13.45 | Mihaela Loghin | Romania | 01.06.1952 | Zittau | 16.08.2012 |
| 13.20 | Sigrun Kofink | Germany | 23.04.1935 | Schweinfurt | 16.08.1997 |
| 12.80 | Anne Chatrine Rühlow | Germany | 30.09.1936 | Osnabrück | 04.07.1997 |
| 12.20 | Rosemary Chrimes | United Kingdom | 19.05.1933 | Miyazaki | 10.10.1993 |
| 11.69 | Marianne Hamm | Germany | 02.10.1927 | Nimwegen | 21.08.1988 |
| 11.03 | Helen Stephens | United States | 03.02.1918 | | 01.06.1982 |
