= Masters M85 800 metres world record progression =

This is the progression of world record improvements of the 800 metres M85 division of Masters athletics.

Key

Incomplete information Pending

Hand	Auto	Athlete	Nationality	Birthdate	Age	Location	Date	Ref
	2:59.50	Jean Louis Esnault	France	19 January 1940	85 years, 167 days	Issy Les Moulineaux	5 July 2025	
	3:06.69	David Carr	Australia	15 June 1932	85 years, 13 days	Perth	28 June 2017	
	3:09.10	Earl Fee	Canada	22 March 1929	85 years, 113 days	Toronto	13 July 2014	
	3:15.15	Earl Fee	Canada	22 March 1929	85 years, 99 days	Toronto	29 June 2014	
	3:17.45	Francisco do Carmo Oliveira	Brazil	8 June 1927	86 years, 135 days	Porto Alegre	21 October 2013	
	3:18.85	Yoshimitsu Miyauchi	Japan	20 July 1924	86 years, 104 days	Kagoshima	1 November 2010	
	3:20.82	Rune Bergman	Sweden	8 October 1924	85 years, 302 days	Högby	6 August 2010	
	3:21.23	Yoshimitsu Miyauchi	Japan	20 July 1924	85 years, 122 days	Nagoya	19 November 2009	
	3:24.03	Holger Josefsson	Sweden	4 October 1918	85 years, 301 days	Arhus	31 July 2004	
	3:29.42	Longino Perez	Mexico	20 February 1902	85 years, 284 days	Melbourne	1 December 1987	
3:45.5 h		Josef Galia	Germany	1 February 1898	87 years, 215 days	St. Augustin	4 September 1985	
3:58.3 h		Paul Spangler	United States	18 March 1899	85 years, 48 days	Eugene	5 May 1984	
