= Masters M85 200 metres world record progression =

This is the progression of world record improvements of the 200 metres M85 division of Masters athletics.

Key

Incomplete information Wind aided Pending

Hand	Auto	Wind	Athlete	Nationality	Birthdate	Age	Location	Date	Ref
	33.27	(−1.7 m/s)	Yoshiyuki Shimizu	Brazil	14 July 1928	85 years, 100 days	Porto Alegre	22 October 2013	
	34.24	(+0.2 m/s)	Ugo Sansonetti	Italy	10 January 1919	85 years, 162 days	Caorle	20 June 2004	
	35.82		Kizo Kimura	Japan	11.07.1911	Seoul	20.10.1996		
	35.99	0.2	Harry Gathercole	Australia	07.06.1907	Miyazaki	11.10.1993		
