= Masters W45 400 metres hurdles world record progression =

This is the progression of world record improvements of the 400 metres hurdles W45 division of Masters athletics.

Key

Incomplete information Pending

Hand	Auto	Athlete	Nationality	Birthdate	Location	Date
	1:01.40	Barbara Gähling	Germany	20.01.1965	Köln	02.06.2011
	1:02.85	Barbara Gähling	Germany	20.01.1965	Kaiserslautern	27.06.2010
	1:03.85	Christine Müller	Switzerland	22.07.1958	Zürich	18.09.2004
	1:04.09	Jan Hynes	Australia	03.04.1944	Sydney	01.04.1994
	1:04.35	Marge Allison	Australia	13.09.1944	Brisbane	19.10.1991
	1:06.02	Marjorie Hocknell	United Kingdom	15.11.1943	Eugene	03.08.1989
	1:07.33	Annelise Damm Olesen	Denmark	02.01.1942	Melbourne	05.12.1987
