= Masters M45 hammer throw world record progression =

Masters M45 hammer throw world record progression is the progression of world record improvements of the hammer throw M45 division of Masters athletics. Records must be set in properly conducted, official competitions under the standing IAAF rules unless modified by World Masters Athletics. The M45 division consists of male athletes who have reached the age of 45 but have not yet reached the age of 50, so exactly from their 45th birthday to the day before their 50th birthday. The M45 division throws exactly the same 7.257 kg implement as the Open division. Most of these competitors all threw their records in open competition. In 1922 through 1925 Matt McGrath threw 49.89, 51.14, 52.53 and 54.09.

Key

Incomplete information Pending

Distance	Athlete	Nationality	Birthdate	Location	Date
79.42	Aleksandr Dryhol	Ukraine	25.04.1966	Jablonec	29.04.2012
78.47	Aleksandr Dryhol	Ukraine	25.04.1966	Donetsk	13.04.2012
75.27	Aleksandr Dryhol	Ukraine	25.04.1966	Kyiv	20.07.2011
70.36	Mick Jones	United Kingdom	23.07.1963	London	05.06.2010
67.74	Yuriy Sedykh	Ukraine	11.06.1955	Clermont Ferrand	20.05.2001
64.70	Dave McKenzie	United States	10.05.1949	Sacramento	04.06.1995
63.46	Murofushi Shigenobu	Japan	02.10.1945	Miyazaki	13.10.1993
62.86	Srecko Stiglic	Yugoslavia	11.06.1943	Sarajevo	04.09.1988
62.52	Hans Pötsch	Austria	20.03.1933	Dornbirn	18.07.1981
61.20	Guy Husson	France	02.03.1931	Aix les Bains	12.09.1976
60.32	Josef Matoušek	Czechoslovakia	07.09.1928	Jablonec	25.05.1974
57.51	Karl Storch	Germany	21.08.1913	Wetzlar	28.06.1959
