= Masters M50 1500 metres world record progression =

This is the progression of world record improvements of the 1500 metres M50 division of Masters athletics.

Key

Incomplete information Pending

Hand	Auto	Athlete	Nationality	Birthdate	Age	Location	Date	Ref
	3:57.71	Zachariah Ashkanasy	Australia	10 July 1973	51 years, 290 days	Melbourne	27 March 2025	
	3:58.26	David Heath	Great Britain	22 May 1965	50 years, 30 days	Castres	21 June 2015	
4:05.2		Tom Roberts	Australia	27 February 1934	50 years, 24 days	Murrumbeena	22 March 1984	
4:05.8		Ray Hatton	United States	5 February 1932	50 years, 153 days		8 July 1982	
4:13.2		Bill Fitzgerald	United States	20 May 1925	50 years, 54 days		13 July 1975	
4.14.6		Jack Ryan	Australia	30 April 1922	52 years, 207 days	Sydney	23 November 1974	
4:15.0		Theo Orr	Australia	12 March 1924	50 years, 25 days		6 April 1974	
