= Leon Coleman =

American hurdler

Leonard "Leon" Coleman (born September 1, 1944, in Alabama) is an American hurdler who competed in the 1968 Summer Olympics.

July 1982 Coleman competed in the Masters So Cal Track and Field Championship meet and won the M35 hurdles race; And, August 1983 winning the Masters West Region meet in the high hurdles.
