= Masters W60 300 metres hurdles world record progression =

This is the progression of world record improvements of the 300 metres hurdles W60 division of Masters athletics.

Key

Incomplete information Pending

Hand	Auto	Athlete	Nationality	Birthdate	Age	Location	Date	Ref
	47.63	Barbara Gähling	Germany	20 January 1965	60 years, 214 days	Gotha	22 August 2025	
	47.79	Barbara Gähling	Germany	20 January 1965	60 years, 129 days	Köln	29 May 2025	
	48.84	Sue McDonald	United States	29 March 1963	61 years, 114 days	Sacramento	21 July 2024	
	48.89	Sue McDonald	United States	29 March 1963	60 years, 116 days	Greensboro	23 July 2023	
	49.80	Jane Horder	Great Britain	18 January 1957	60 years, 151 days	Exeter	18 June 2017	
	51.64	Marge Allison	Australia	13 September 1944	60 years, 347 days	San Sebastian	26 August 2005	
	53.05	Corrie Roovers	Netherlands	14 July 1935	60 years, 2 days	Buffalo	16 July 1995	
	56.80	Betty Vosburgh	United States	1931	60	Naperville	5 July 1991	
	58.59	Asta Larsson	Sweden	23 October 1931	61 years, 352 days	Miyazaki	10 October 1993	
