= Masters M80 triple jump world record progression =

This is the progression of world record improvements of the triple jump M80 division of Masters athletics.

Key

Incomplete information Pending

Distance	Wind	Athlete	Nationality	Birthdate	Location	Date
8.95	0.3	Mazumi Morita	Japan	17.07.1913	Miyazaki	13.10.1993
8.29		Singh Gulab	India	13.10.1905	Melbourne	28.11.1987
7.17		Ian Hume	Canada	20.08.1914	Uniondale	19.07.1986
6.90		Herb Anderson	United States			
