= Masters W55 high jump world record progression =

This is the progression of world record improvements of the high jump W55 division of Masters athletics.

Key

Incomplete information Pending Indoor mark before 2000, not acceptable for record

Height	Athlete	Nationality	Birthdate	Location	Date
1.55	Florence Picaut	France	25.10.1952	Versailles	18.05.2008
1.50	Weia Reinboud	Netherlands	11.03.1950	Krommenie	02.07.2006
1.48	Weia Reinboud	Netherlands	11.03.1950	Emmen	10.06.2006
1.48 i	Renate Vogel	Germany	26.11.1943	Malmö	06.03.1999
1.43	Taisija Tchentchik	Russia	30.01.1936	Turku	23.07.1991
1.39 i	Grethe Bolstad	Norway	02.08.1935	Ekeberg	24.02.1991
1.38	Christiane Schmalbruch	Germany	08.01.1937	Miyazaki	11.10.1993
1.38	Erika Stähle	Germany	27.08.1941	Durban	17.07.1997
1.37	Rosemary Chrimes	United Kingdom	19.05.1933	Reading	09.07.1989
1.35	Daphne Pirie	Australia	12.12.1931	Melbourne	01.12.1987
