= Masters W80 10000 metres world record progression =

This is the progression of world record improvements of the 10000 metres W80 division of Masters athletics.

Key

Incomplete information Pending

Hand	Auto	Athlete	Nationality	Birthdate	Location	Date
	55:26.46	Denise Leclerc	France	10.10.1933	Porto Alegre	21.10.2013
	58:24.70	Nina Naumenko	Russia	15.06.1925	San Sebastián	28.08.2005
	58:40.03	Johanna Luther	Germany	02.08.1913	Miyazaki	07.10.1993
1:05.47.2		Anne Clarke	United States	21.09.1909	Naperville	04.07.1991
