= Masters W80 800 metres world record progression =

This is the progression of world record improvements of the 800 metres W80 division of Masters athletics.

Key

Incomplete information Pending

| Hand | Auto | Athlete | Nationality | Birthdate | Location | Date |
|---|---|---|---|---|---|---|
| | 3:25.80 | Yolande Marchal | France | 10 September 1939 | Chalon-sur-Saône | 10 October 2020 |
| | 3:30.41 | Yoko Nakano | Japan | 1 December 1935 | Málaga | 11 September 2018 |
| | 3:38.15 | Yoko Nakano | Japan | 1 December 1935 | Niigata | 17 September 2016 |
| | 3:45.00 | Nina Naumenko | Russia | 15 June 1925 | San Sebastián | 29 August 2005 |
| | 3:54.81 | Johanna Luther | Germany | 2 August 1913 | Miyazaki | 10 October 1993 |
