= Kathy Bergen =

American masters athlete

Kathy Bergen (born December 24, 1939) is an American Masters athletics track and field athlete. She is the current world record holder in the W70 100 meters and the high jump. She also holds the Indoor World records for the W65 high jump, the W70 60 meters, 200 meters and high jump. And she holds the American record for the W70 200 meters and the W65 high jump. She is the oldest woman to break the 15 second barrier in the 100 meters and to break 32 seconds in the 200 meters.

She is also the first 70-year-old woman to jump 1.30 meters in the high jump at USATF Masters Championships in Sacramento in 2010.

54 and a half years of age is not the normal time for someone to become an athlete. Even amongst senior athletes, where groups correspond with ages evenly divisible by 5, that would be disadvantageous. But the mother of five was not approaching the sport with high aspirations. Her only previous athletic pursuits were two years of high school basketball and many years of playing tennis at as high as 4.0 level and occasionally playing doubles with her husband, Bert. It was chasing the ball in those tennis matches that her husband noticed she was rather quick. Both of them went to the Pasadena Senior Olympics in 1994, where her relative speed vs. other people in her age group showed up. By the end of 1996, she already held the W55 American record in the high jump. She has a professional coach, who has worked with athletes more than 50 years her junior.

"She hasn't reached her peak yet, I definitely think we can break the records she already set."

— Eric Dixon, Bergen's coach

In 2010, she set the W70 100 meter World Record before an audience of thousands at the Mt. SAC Relays.

Bergen was featured in ESPN Magazine October 1, 2012 issue in an article called "Senior moments."

Upon aging up to the 75-79 age group in 2015, Kathy broke 6 World Records-3 Indoor Records in the 60m, 200m and high jump, 3 Outdoor Records in the 100m, 200m and high jump. She also broke an American Record in the discus throw. USATF Masters committee named her 2015 co-winner of the Female Masters Athlete of the Year Award.

On February 16, 2020 at the Southwest Region Masters Meet held at the University of Houston, Kathy broke three Indoor World Records in the W80-84 age group. The first was in the high jump in which she jumped 1.20 m, which is an age-graded 117.31%. She ran 10.02 in the 60m and 35.66 in the 200m before the indoor season was cancelled. In October at the outdoor Texas vs World meet she added 2 more World Records to her haul in 2020. She high jumped 1.15m and ran the 100m in 16.62 sec.

In 2021 at the Striders Meet of Champions, Kathy broke 2 more World Records-100m in 16.26 sec and the 200m in 35.34 sec. At the Masters Outdoor Championships in July, she won 4 golds in the W80-84 discus, 100m, 200m and high jump and led off in the W65-69 4x100m relay which broke the American Record by 7 seconds in the time of 1:05.16 sec. She lowered the 100m record 2 more times to 16.23 at the CA Senior Games Championship.

In October 2021 the USATF Masters Committee voted her the Masters Athlete of the Year. Bergen was elected to the USATF Masters Hall of Fame in 2008.

In March 2023 at the USATF Masters Indoor Championship held in Louisville, KY Kathy led off the 4x200m relay which broke the W65-69 American Record. She ended 2023 tied for 1st in the World Rankings in the W80 High Jump with a height of 1.10m.

== Additional meets winning gold medals ==
- USATF Masters Indoor Championships
- USATF Masters Outdoor Championships
- Masters So Cal Track and Field Championship
