= Tom Patsalis =

American track and field athlete

Tom Patsalis (December 6, 1921 – July 29, 2014) was an American track and field athlete. He had set 26 World Records in his career, a career that was still active in his late 80s. As of 2014 he is the World Record holder in the M60 Long Jump, set in 1982 and thus a record he has held for more than three decades. As of 2014, only one jumper has come within .2 m (7 3/4 in). He is also the American record holder in the Long Jump for the M60 age division, has an as yet unrecognized mark that has been pending since 1977 (though recognized by the California Track News chief statistician at the time, Percy Knox) still 7 inches superior to the listed American record and is the American record holder in the Triple Jump in the M60 and M65 age divisions. He was selected to the Masters division of the National Track and Field Hall of Fame in 2003.

Patsalis was originally from Detroit, Michigan but, after 50 years of marriage, he retired in Alhambra, California. He claimed he had been participating in track and field since high school, 70 years in the sport. In addition to jumping, he also ran sprints and hurdled until he was 70. He was a member of the University of Southern California National Championship track team in 1949, a teammate of Olympian Mel Patton, graduating from the university in 1950 when he was 28 years old, his education delayed by World War II. At USC he studied music, making his career playing in big bands, even leading his own band under the name of Tom Palis. He made Greek music a specialty.

He was a pioneer in the early days of Masters athletics, winning three events at the second-ever World Association of Veteran Athletes Championships in 1977 in Gothenburg, Sweden. He won at the World Championships many times since. In 1981, just 8 months before his 60th birthday, he long jumped over 20 feet and four months before that same birthday he triple jumped over 40 feet, the oldest person to achieve such milestones. In 1982 he was selected California Track and Running News "Masters Athlete of the Year" after setting the M60 World Record in both the long jump and triple jump the same day at the Southern California TAC Championships at California State University, Los Angeles. Patsalis remained active until he suffered a stroke in May 2014. He died from complications two months later.
