= Masters M55 5000 metres world record progression =

This is the progression of world record improvements of the 5000 metres M55 division of Masters athletics.

Key

Incomplete information Pending

Hand	Auto	Athlete	Nationality	Birthdate	Location	Date
15:29.7		Keith Bateman	Australia	29.06.1955	Sydney	05.01.2011
15:37.0		Michael Hager	United Kingdom	06.09.1950	Coventry	06.05.2006
	15:41.72	Ron Robertson	New Zealand	03.06.1941	Hastings	15.02.1997
	15:42.35	Günther Hesselmann	Germany	03.08.1925	Essen	27.06.1981
15:52.8		Jack Ryan	Australia	30.04.1922	Melbourne	20.04.1978
15:57.0		John Gilmour	Australia	03.05.1919	Perth	08.08.1975
15:57.0		George McGrath	Australia	10.12.1919	Sydney	26.04.1976
