= Masters W75 pole vault world record progression =

This is the progression of world record improvements of the pole vault W75 division of Masters athletics.

Key

Incomplete information Pending

Height	Athlete	Nationality	Birthdate	Age	Location	Date	Ref
2.03 m	Florence "Flo" Meiler	United States	1 June 1934	76 years, 32 days	Albany	3 July 2010	
2.00 m	Midori Yamamoto	Japan	13 September 1934	75 years, 28 days	Sydney	11 October 2009	
1.90 m	Leonore McDaniels	United States	6 March 1928	75 years, 154 days	Eugene	7 August 2003	
1.70 m	Johnnye Valien	United States	24 July 1925	75 years, 17 days	Eugene	10 August 2000	
1.50 m	Margaret Hinton	United States	14 August 1919	77 years, 7 days	Eugene	21 August 1996	
