= Masters W55 triple jump world record progression =

This is the progression of world record improvements of the triple jump W55 division of Masters athletics.

Key

Incomplete information Pending Wind aided

| Distance | Wind | Athlete | Nationality | Birthdate | Location | Date |
|---|---|---|---|---|---|---|
| 10.97 | | Akiko Oohinata | Japan | 14.12.1949 | Kofu | 25.06.2006 |
| 10.20 | 1.9 | Margaret Taylor | Australia | 06.04.1948 | Perth | 30.04.2003 |
| 9.93 | 1.7 | Christiane Schmalbruch | Germany | 08.01.1937 | Athens | 08.06.1994 |
