= Masters M85 Mile world record progression =

This is the progression of world record improvements of the Mile M85 division of Masters athletics.

Key

Incomplete information Pending

Hand	Auto	Athlete	Nationality	Birthdate	Location	Date	Ref
	6:40.25	Manuel Alonso	Spain	21 March 1936	Sabadell	22 May 2021	
7:16.7 h		David Carr	Australia	15 June 1932	Perth	17 August 2017	
	7:22.28	Ed Whitlock	Canada	6 March 1931	Windsor	28 June 2016	
	7:18.55	Ed Whitlock	Canada	6 March 1931	Cambridge	10 June 2016	
