= Masters M45 long jump world record progression =

This is the progression of world record improvements of the long jump M45 division of Masters athletics.

Key

Incomplete information Pending

Distance	Wind	Athlete	Nationality	Birthdate	Age	Location	Date
7.27	+1.2	Tapani Taavitsainen	Finland	17 June 1944	46 years, 65 days	Bern	21 August 1990
7.13		Pericles Pinto	Portugal	15 February 1937	45 years, 75 days	Lisbon	1 May 1982
6.68		Shirley Davisson	United States	28 February 1930	45 years, 218 days	Victorville	4 October 1975
