= Masters M85 10000 metres world record progression =

This is the progression of world record improvements of the 10000 metres M85 division of Masters athletics.

Key

Incomplete information Pending

Hand	Auto	Athlete	Nationality	Birthdate	Location	Date
52:50.8		Max Raschke	Germany	20.04.1905	Munich	18.09.1993
54:23.0		Josef Galia	Germany	01.02.1898	St. Augustin	28.08.1985
