= Masters W90 1500 metres world record progression =

This is the progression of world record improvements of the 1500 metres W90 division of Masters athletics.

Key

Incomplete information Pending

Time	Athlete	Nationality	Birthdate	Location	Date
12:34.67	Lenore Montgomery	Canada	28 May 1930	Surrey	12 September 2020
