= Road to Boston =

2023 South Korean film by Kang Je-gyu

- Theatrical release poster
- Hangul: 1947 보스톤
- Lit.: 1947 Boston
- RR: 1947 Boseuton
- MR: 1947 Posŭt'on
- Directed by: Kang Je-gyu
- Written by: Lee Sang-hyun; Son Kwang-soo
- Produced by: Jang Won-seok; Kang Je-gyu
- Starring: Ha Jung-woo; Yim Si-wan; Bae Seong-woo; Kim Sang-ho
- Cinematography: Choi Chan-min
- Edited by: Park Gok-ji; Lee Yoon-hee
- Music by: Lee Dong-june
- Production companies: Saetbyul Media; BA Entertainment; Big Picture
- Distributed by: Lotte Entertainment
- Release date: 27 September 2023 (South Korea)
- Running time: 108 minutes
- Country: South Korea
- Language: Korean
- Box office: US$7.2 million

Road to Boston (Korean: 1947 보스톤; lit. '1947 Boston') is a 2023 South Korean biographical sports film written and directed by Kang Je-gyu starring Ha Jung-woo, Yim Si-wan, Bae Seong-woo and Kim Sang-ho. It tells the story of Korean athletes who participated in the Boston International Marathon in 1947, the first international marathon held since World War II. It was released theatrically on September 27, 2023, coinciding with Korea's Chuseok holiday.

== Plot ==
In the 1936 Berlin Olympics, marathon gold medalist Sohn Kee-chung set a world record. On the podium, as Japan's national anthem "Kimigayo" played, he covered the Japanese flag on his uniform with a potted plant. Overnight, he became a national hero to Koreans, but under Japanese colonial rule, he was forbidden to run again.

In 1947, post-liberation Seoul, rising star Suh Yun-bok is seen as the second Sohn Kee-chung. Suh is suddenly approached by the legendary runner himself, who suggests they compete in the Boston Marathon. Sohn wants to reclaim the glory lost in Berlin, this time running proudly under the Korean flag. Though they couldn't even afford a single pair of running shoes, the Korean marathoners embark on an unforgettable journey to Boston.

== Cast ==
- Ha Jung-woo as Sohn Kee-chung
- Yim Si-wan as Suh Yun-bok
- Bae Seong-woo as Nam Sung-yong
- Kim Sang-ho as Baek Nam-hyeon
- Choi Gyu-hwan
- Oh Hee-jun as Dong-gu
- Seo Jeong-yeon as Suh Yun-bok's mother
- Jung Young-joo as Ok-rim's mother
- Hwang Ja-neung as a former track and field athlete
- Jo Hye-sun as a gisaeng madam
- Ron Kelly as Major General John R. Hodge
- Park Hyo-joo as Yoon-seo
- Park Eun-bin as Ok-rim

== Production ==
The script reading was held on the September 4, 2019, and filming began on September 9 in Seoul. In January 2020, actors of Boston 1947 departed for Australia for the shooting of the film.

=== Music ===
The soundtrack is composed by Lee Dong-june.

Track listing
No.	Title	Length
1.	"1947 Road to Boston Prologue"	2:55
2.	"You Are Hero"	0:52
3.	"Invitation to Boston"	2:40
4.	"Run 100 Laps"	2:22
5.	"Song with Mother"	1:12
6.	"Sorry My Son"	1:41
7.	"Road to Boston"	2:39
8.	"Go to Boston"	4:07
9.	"Arrive in Boston"	1:40
10.	"I Want to Run"	1:24
11.	"Our Flag"	3:00
12.	"The Day We All Can't Forget"	2:59
13.	"Newton Lower Falls"	0:56
14.	"Now This Is The Game"	4:02
15.	"Run Again"	4:18
16.	"I'm Runner I'm Happy"	3:24
17.	"The Most Wonderful Race"	2:07
18.	"Tears of Joy"	0:39
19.	"Our Heroes"	1:57
20.	"1947 Road to Boston"	1:50
Total length:		46:00

== Reception ==
As of November 2, 2023, the film has grossed US$7,212,399 at the local box office and accumulated 1,021,223 admissions from 1,282 screens.

== Awards and nominations ==
Award	Category	Recipient	Result
59th Grand Bell Awards	Best Director	Kang Je-gyu	Nominated
59th Grand Bell Awards	Best Actor	Yim Si-wan	Nominated
59th Grand Bell Awards	Best Costume Design	Chae Gyeong-hwa	Nominated
22nd Director's Cut Awards	Best Director	Kang Je-gyu	Nominated
22nd Director's Cut Awards	Best Actor	Yim Si-wan	Nominated
17th Asian Film Awards	Best Original Music	Lee Dong-june	Nominated
