= Blue Dragon Film Award for Technical Award =

- Awarded for: Technical Award
- Country: South Korea
- Presented by: Blue Dragon Film Awards
- First award: 1963
- Website: www.blueaward.co.kr

The Blue Dragon Film Award for Technical Award is one of the awards that is presented annually at the Blue Dragon Film Awards by Sports Chosun, which is typically held at the end of the year.

== Winners ==
=== 1960s ===
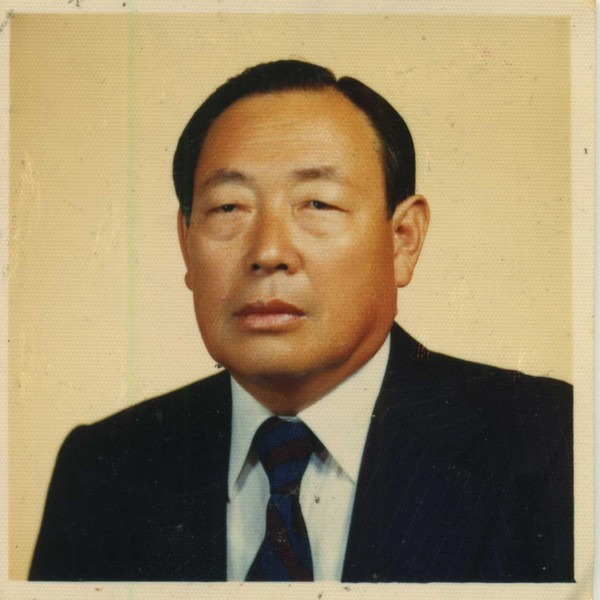
Lee Kyeong-soon sound engineer

#	Year	Recipient	Film
1	1963	Lee Kyeong-soon (sound engineering)	Bloodline
2	1964	Yang Seong-ran (editing)	Red Scarf
3	1965	Go Hae-jin (lighting)	The Martyred
4	1966	Kim Hee-soo (editing)	Orders to Escape
5	1967	Cha Jeong-nam (lighting)	Han (Regret)
6	1969	Lee Kyeong-soon (sound engineering)	Descendants of Cain

=== 1970s ===
#	Year	Recipient	Film
7	1970	Cha Jeong-nam (lighting)	I Would Like to Become a Human
8	1971	Jeong Gyeong-hee (lighting)	A Bout in 30 Years
9	1972	Jang Hyeon-su (editing)	A Cattle Seller
10	1973	Kim Jeong	Special Investigation Bureau: Kim So-san, the Kisaeng

=== 1990s ===
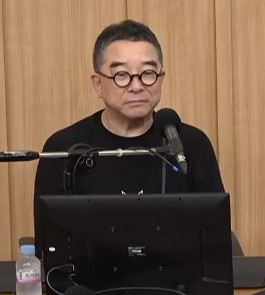
Kim Soo-chul in 2024

#	Year	Recipient	Film
11	1990	Yoo Young-gil (cinematography)	Black Republic
14	1993	Ahn Sang-soo (art director)	The Blue in You
15	1994	Kim Soo-chul (music)	The Taebaek Mountains
16	1995	Yoon Jeong-seop (art director)	The Hair Dresser
17	1996	Lee Dong-june (music)	The Ginkgo Bed
18	1997	Lee Dong-june (music)	Green Fish
19	1998	Special effects team	The Soul Guardians
20	1999	Jeong Do-an (special effects)	Phantom: The Submarine

=== 2000s ===
#	Year	Recipient	Film
21	2000	Jeong Do-an (special effects)	Libera Me
22	2001	Im Jae-young (lighting)	Waikiki Brothers
23	2002	Jang Seong-ho (digital effects)	2009: Lost Memories
24	2003	Oh Sang-man (production design)	Spring, Summer, Fall, Winter... and Spring
25	2004	Jeong Do-an (special effects)	Taegukgi
26	2005	Shin Jae-ho (Visual Effects Director)	Blood Rain
27	2006	The Orphanage, EON Digital Film (Visual Effects)	The Host
28	2007	DTI, ETRI (CGI)	The Restless
29	2008	Insight Visual (VFX)	Modern Boy
30	2009	Hans Uhlig, Jang Seong-ho, Kim Hee-dong (VFX)	Haeundae

=== 2010s ===
#	Year	Recipient	Film
31	2010	Park Jung-ryul (stunt coordinator)	The Man from Nowhere
32	2011	Oh Se-young (martial arts director)	War of the Arrows
33	2012	Yoo Sang-seob, Jung Yoon-hyun (martial arts directors)	The Thieves
34	2013	Jeong Seong-jin (special effects)	Mr. Go
35	2014	Kang Jong-ik (special effects)	The Pirates
36	2015	Jo Sang-gyeong, Son Na-ri (costume design)	Assassination
37	2016	Kwak Tae-yong, Hwang Hyo-gyun (special makeup effects)	Train to Busan
38	2017	Kwon Gwi-duk (stunt coordinator)	The Villainess
39	2018	Jin Jong-hyeon (VFX)	Along with the Gods: The Two Worlds
40	2019	Yoon Jin-yool, Kwon Ji-hoon (stunt coordinator)	Exit

=== 2020s ===
#	Year	Recipient	Film
41	2020	Jin Jong-hyun (VFX)	Ashfall
42	2021	Jeong Seong-jin, Jeong Chol-min (special effects)	Space Sweepers
43	2022	Huh Myung-haeng, Yoon Seong-min (martial arts director)	The Roundup
44	2023	Jin Jong-hyun (VFX)	The Moon
45	2024	Yoo Sang-seob, Jang Han-seung (martial arts director)	I, the Executioner
46	2025	Jo Sang-gyeong (costume design)	No Other Choice

== General references ==
- "Winners and nominees lists". Blue Dragon Film Awards (in Korean). Archived from the original on 27 January 2022.
- "Blue Dragon Film Awards". Naver (in Korean).
