= My Way (2011 film) =

- Theatrical release poster
- Hangul: 마이웨이
- RR: Maiwei
- MR: Maiwei
- Directed by: Kang Je-gyu
- Written by: Kim Byung-in; Na Hyun; Kang Je-gyu
- Produced by: Kang Je-gyu; Kim Yong-hwa; James Choi
- Starring: Jang Dong-gun; Joe Odagiri; Fan Bingbing
- Cinematography: Lee Mo-gae
- Edited by: Park Gok-ji
- Music by: Lee Dong-jun
- Production companies: CJ Entertainment; SK Planet; Directors
- Distributed by: CJ Entertainment
- Release date: 21 December 2011 (South Korea)
- Running time: 119 minutes
- Country: South Korea
- Languages: Korean; Japanese; Russian; German; Mandarin; English
- Budget: US$24 million
- Box office: US$16.6 million

My Way (Korean: 마이 웨이) is a 2011 South Korean epic war film produced, co-written and directed by Kang Je-gyu. It stars Jang Dong-gun, alongside Japanese actor Joe Odagiri and Chinese actress Fan Bingbing. Set before and during World War II, the film follows a pair of rival marathon runners, one Korean and the other Japanese, who befriend each other as they are conscripted across the war's different fronts.

My Way is based on the story of Yang Kyoungjong, a Korean conscript who allegedly served in the Imperial Japanese Army, the Red Army, and the Wehrmacht before being captured by the United States Army during Operation Overlord. The film is one of the most expensive to have ever been produced in South Korea, with a budget of ₩28 billion (US$24 million).

The film was released in South Korea on 21 December 2011, but performed poorly at the box office due to high competition and received generally mixed reviews from critics.

== Plot ==
In 1928, Kim Jun-shik (Shin Sang-yeob) works alongside his father (Chun Ho-jin) and sister Eun-soo (Lee Yeon-hee) on the farm of the Hasegawa family (Shiro Sano, Kumi Nakamura) in Gyeong-seong (present-day Seoul), Japanese-occupied Korea. Jun-shik and Tatsuo Hasegawa (Sung Yu-bin) are interested in running. When they are teenagers (Do Ji-han, Yukichi Kobayashi), they have become fierce competitors. Tatsuo's grandfather (Isao Natsuyagi) is killed in a bombing by a Korean freedom fighter, and Korean runner Sohn Kee-chung (Yoon Hee-won) wins a marathon race against Japanese competitors, further inflaming already-tense Korean–Japanese tensions.

Ten years later in May 1938, Jun-shik (Jang Dong-gun) is working as a rickshaw runner. Koreans have been banned from taking part in sports events, and Tatsuo (Joe Odagiri), now a fierce Japanese nationalist, has sworn that a Korean will never again win a race. He has been accepted by a medical college in Berlin, Nazi Germany, but Tatsuo decides to stay in Korea to run in the All Japan Trials for the marathon. Sohn secretly backs Jun-shik, who wins the race, but Tatsuo is awarded the medal when Jun-shik is disqualified for allegedly cheating. A riot by Korean spectators ensues, and as punishment, those who started the riot are forcibly drafted into the Imperial Japanese Army, including Jun-shik and his friend Lee Jong-dae (Kim In-kwon), who has a crush on Eun-soo.

In July 1939, the Koreans are deployed to the battle at Nomonhan on the border with Mongolia, where Shirai (雪莱/徐莱；Fan Bingbing), a Chinese sniper avenging the deaths of her family at the hands of the Japanese, is captured and tortured. Noda Tatsuo, now a colonel, arrives and takes command and forces Takakura (高倉; Shingo Tsurumi), the unit's commander who is fairer to the Koreans, to commit seppuku. After refusing to join a suicide squad, Jun-shik is imprisoned with Shirai but escapes with her, Jong-dae, and two other friends to the Khalkhin Gol, where they spot a massive Red Army advance. Jun-shik runs back to warn the Japanese forces, while Shirai sacrifices herself to shoot down an I-16 Ishak, but Tatsuo refuses to order a retreat. During the one-sided battle, a tank shell explodes near Tatsuo and Jun-shik, knocking them unconscious.

Jun-shik and Tatsuo are captured and, by February 1940, are held in Kungur prisoner-of-war camp south-east of Perm, Soviet Union, where both Koreans and Japanese are incarcerated together. Jong-dae, under the name of "Anton", has become a pro-Soviet work-unit leader who helps his fellow Koreans and abuses the Japanese prisoners. Jun-shik humiliates Tatsuo in a sanctioned fight to the death, but refuses to kill him, and both get punished together. Later, a riot incited by a work accident leads to Tatsuo and Jun-shik being sentenced to execution by firing squad, but it is interrupted by the German declaration of war on the Soviet Union, prompting a mass conscription of POWs; Jong-dae volunteers Jun-shik and Tatsuo into the Red Army, saving their lives. In December 1941, their penal unit engages the Wehrmacht at Dedovsk, but many of them are killed, including Jong-dae. Jun-shik convinces Tatsuo to don German uniforms scavenged from bodies and trek over the mountains into German territory. During their expedition, Jun-shik realizes Tatsuo is injured and attempts to find medicine for him in an abandoned town, but German soldiers find them and, unable to understand what they are saying, capture them.

By 1944, Tatsuo has been enlisted into the Wehrmacht and transferred to a unit in Normandy, Occupied France, where he is manning the Atlantic Wall. Noticing a man running on the beach, Tatsuo catches up to him and notices it is Jun-shik, who he has not seen since 1941. They plan to desert by boarding a ship in Cherbourg to safely sail away from the theatre before ultimately returning home to Korea. However, their attempt to leave is interrupted by the Normandy landings, and a German officer locks the pair into a machine gun pillbox. They force their way out as the United States Army scales the cliffside, and attempt to sprint away inland, but Jun-shik is mortally wounded in the chest by shrapnel from naval artillery. Noticing American paratroopers landing nearby, and knowing they could kill Tatsuo for being Japanese, Jun-shik forcibly replaces Tatsuo's identification tags with his own and tells Tatsuo, "he is now Jun-shik", before dying in his arms as the paratroopers surround them.

After the war, Tatsuo runs in the athletics event at the 1948 Summer Olympics in London, participating as "Jun-Shik Kim". In a flashback to his first encounter with Jun-shik in Gyeong-seong, Tatsuo monologues that when he first met him, he was secretly happy to have found someone who could be his running mate.

== Cast ==
- Jang Dong-gun as Kim Jun-shik
- Joe Odagiri as Tatsuo Hasegawa (長谷川 辰雄 Hasegawa Tatsuo)
- Fan Bingbing as Shirai
- Kim In-kwon as Lee Jong-dae
- Lee Yeon-hee as Kim Eun-soo
- Yoon Hee-won as Sohn Kee-chung
- Chun Ho-jin as Kim Jun-shik's father
- Isao Natsuyagi as Tatsuo's grandfather

== Production ==
My Way was the first film Kang Je-gyu directed after taking a 7-year hiatus. Kang first received the original screenplay by writer Kim Byung-in (also known as Justin Kim) the working title D-Day in 2007, and after watching a Korean documentary on the subject, he decided to turn the script into a film in 2008.

Production lasted eight months from October 2010 to June 2011, with locations in Latvia and Korea (Hapcheon, Cheongoksan National Park in Gangwon Province, Saemangeum Seawall). The Soviet BT-5 and BT-7 tanks in the film were copies built on the chassis of British FV432 APCs.

=== Soundtrack ===
1. Andrea Bocelli – To Find My Way

== Reception ==
Despite being one of the most expensive Korean films ever made with a budget of ₩28 billion (US$24 million), the film flopped at the box office. It encountered stronger than expected competition from Mission: Impossible – Ghost Protocol, released on 15 December, and it also received a lukewarm response from viewers. From its release 21 December to the end of the year, My Way sold 1.58 million tickets – only a small fraction of what it would have needed in order to break even.

On the review aggregator website Rotten Tomatoes, 21% of 19 critics' reviews are positive, with an average rating of 4.7/10. Metacritic, which uses a weighted average, assigned the film a score of 30 out of 100, based on 12 critics, indicating "generally unfavorable" reviews.

The film was nominated in the category of "Best International Film" for the 39th Saturn Awards but lost against Headhunters.
