= Salut d'Amour (film) =

- Theatrical release poster
- Directed by: Kang Je-gyu
- Written by: Lee Sang-hyun; Pang Eun-jin; Kang Je-gyu
- Based on: Lovely, Still by Nik Fackler
- Produced by: Jeon Pil-do; Im Sang-jin
- Starring: Park Geun-hyung; Youn Yuh-jung
- Cinematography: Lee Hyung-deok
- Edited by: Park Gok-ji
- Music by: Lee Dong-june
- Production company: Big Picture
- Distributed by: CJ Entertainment
- Release date: April 9, 2015 (South Korea)
- Running time: 112 minutes
- Country: South Korea
- Language: Korean
- Box office: US$7.8 million

Salut d'Amour (Korean: 장수상회; RR: Jangsusanghoe; lit. 'Jang-soo's Store') is a 2015 South Korean romantic comedy-drama film starring Park Geun-hyung and Youn Yuh-jung and directed by Kang Je-gyu. It is a remake of the 2008 American film Lovely, Still.

== Plot ==
Sung-chil is a grumpy 70-year-old man who lives alone and works part-time at the local supermarket. Jang-soo, owner of the supermarket and president of the city's redevelopment project, has been trying in vain to get Sung-chil's signature (he's the last hold-out and the only reason for the project's delay), but Sung-chil stubbornly refuses any change to his lifestyle. Then he meets his new neighbor Geum-nim, a feisty yet friendly elderly lady who runs the flower shop next door. Despite his age, Sung-chil is inexperienced and clumsy at romance so the entire town cheers him on and helps him court her. But Geum-nim's daughter Min-jung disapproves of the relationship.

== Cast ==
- Park Geun-hyung as Kim Sung-chil
  - Jung Hae-in as young Sung-chil
  - Ko Yoon-ho as middle-aged Sung-chil
- Youn Yuh-jung as Im Geum-nim
  - Yoon So-hee as young Geum-nim
  - Lee Moon-jung as middle-aged Geum-nim
- Cho Jin-woong as Jang-soo
- Han Ji-min as Min-jung
- Kim Jung-tae as Kim Chi-soo
- Hwang Woo-seul-hye as Miss Park
- Lee Jun-hyeok as Ok Bok-sung
- Kim Jae-hwa as Madam Wang
- Moon Ga-young as Ah-young
- Chanyeol as Min-sung
- Bae Ho-geun as Jegal Chung-soo
- Nam Myung-ryul as Old gentleman
- Kim Ha-yoo as Da-young
- Choi Kyu-hwan as Ho-joon
- Lee Cho-hee as Bank clerk
- Yeom Hye-ran as Milk woman
- Baek Il-seob (cameo)
- Im Ha-ryong (cameo)

== Remake ==
A Chinese remake directed by Eric Tsang is in pre-production and is scheduled for release in China in 2017.

== Awards and nominations ==
Year	Award	Category	Recipient	Result
2015	The Golden Goblet	Best Film	Kang Je-gyu	Nominated
