= Ham Kee-yong =

South Korean long-distance runner (1930–2022)

- Born: Ham Kee-yong; 14 November 1930; Shunsen, Korea, Empire of Japan
- Died: 9 November 2022 (aged 91)
- Occupation: Long distance runner
- Known for: Winner of Boston Marathon in 1950

- Ham Kee-yong
- Hangul: 함기용
- Hanja: 咸基鎔
- RR: Ham Giyong
- MR: Ham Kiyong

Ham Kee-yong (Korean: 함기용; 14 November 1930 – 9 November 2022) was a South Korean marathoner, best known as the winner of the 1950 Boston Marathon.

On 19 April 1950, he won the Boston Marathon with a record time of 2:32:39, under coach Sohn Kee-chung, the marathon winner at the 1936 Berlin Olympics. The second and third-place finishers that year, Song Gil-yun (송길윤, 宋吉允; 숭문중학) and Choe Yun-chil (최윤칠, 崔崙七; 연희대학) were also South Koreans. A South Korean male would not win the Boston Marathon again until 2001.

The Korean War broke out on 25 June 1950, so a planned victory celebration did not take place that year. On 18 April 2004, his feat was finally celebrated in his hometown, Chuncheon, with Ham in attendance.

== Achievements ==
Year	Competition	Venue	Position	Event	Notes
Representing South Korea
1950	Boston Marathon	Boston, United States	1st	Marathon	2:32:39

== See also ==
- Suh Yun-bok, the winner of the 1947 Boston marathon
- Lee Bong-ju, the winner of the 2001 Boston marathon
