= Jang Dong-gun =

South Korean actor

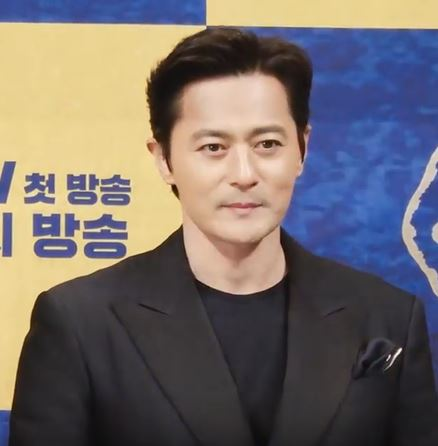
- Jang in May 2019
- Born: March 7, 1972 (age 54); Geumcheon-gu, Seoul, South Korea
- Occupation: Actor
- Years active: 1992–present
- Agent: FMstory
- Spouse: Ko So-young (m. 2010)
- Children: 2

Korean name
- Hangul: 장동건
- Hanja: 張東健
- RR: Jang Donggeon
- MR: Chang Tonggŏn

Jang Dong-gun (Korean: 장동건; born March 7, 1972) is a South Korean actor. He is best known for his leading roles in the films Friend (2001) and Taegukgi: The Brotherhood of War (2004). Jang is one of the highest-paid actors and celebrity endorsers in Korea, consistently topping surveys by industry insiders of most bankable stars.

== Early life ==
Jang Dong-gun spent his childhood in Yongsan District, Seoul, and later went on to study at the Korea National University of Arts School of Drama, though he dropped out before obtaining a degree.

== Career ==
=== 1992–2003: Beginnings and breakout ===
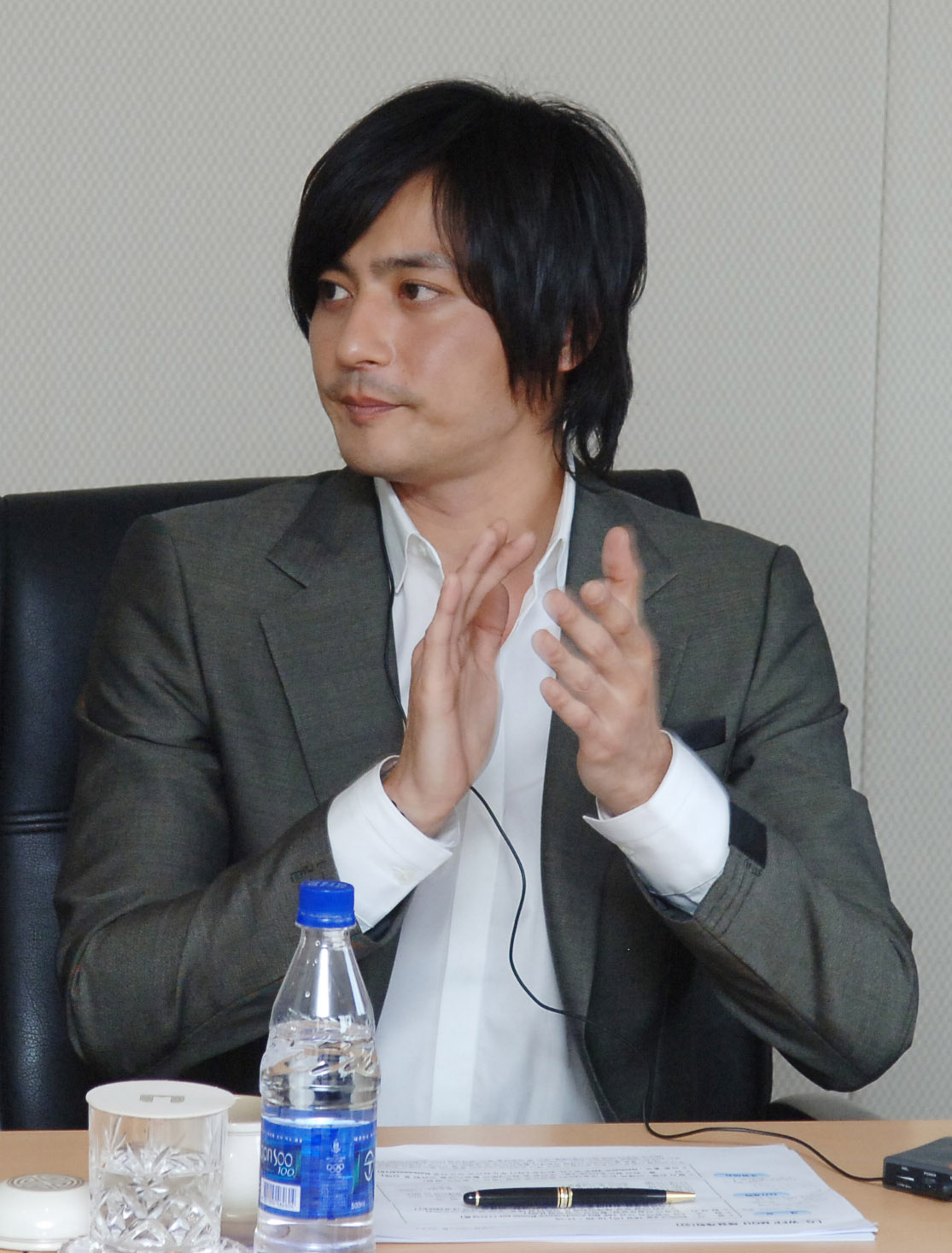
Jang in April 16, 2009

Jang first entered the entertainment world in a talent contest in 1992. He began by acting in TV dramas such as Iljimae, The Last Match, co-starring Shim Eun-ha, and he eventually made his film debut in Repechage (1997) together with Kim Hee-sun.

By the late 1990s he had become quite popular in Korea, but he also became one of the first Korean stars to garner a fan following in other parts of Asia, after several of his TV dramas were screened there in the late nineties. In 1999, after acting in the critically acclaimed Nowhere to Hide as Park Joong-hoon's younger partner, Jang moved on to star in a feature that was filmed on location in Shanghai. Titled Anarchists, this tale of five young terrorists from 1930s China helped to elevate his status even further.

Jang's breakout came in early 2001 in Friend, which smashed the box office record set by Shiri to become (at the time) the biggest Korean film of all time. After playing the nice guy in almost all his previous roles, this portrayal of a tough-talking gangster from Busan led him to local stardom. The following year he starred in the popular action blockbuster 2009 Lost Memories set in a futuristic Great Japan, and appeared in the low-budget film The Coast Guard by controversial director Kim Ki-duk.

=== 2004–2011: Overseas popularity and Hollywood debut ===
In 2004, Jang took the lead role in Kang Je-gyu's Taegukgi, an epic film about two brothers set during the Korean War. The film broke Friend's record with an astounding 11 million tickets sold. By this time, Jang's name had become known widely throughout Asia.

Jang followed this up with The Promise, a $30 million pan-Asian production by Chinese director Chen Kaige in which he played opposite Hong Kong star Cecilia Cheung. Meanwhile, he was cast in Typhoon as a modern-day pirate who has been betrayed by both North and South Korea. Directed by Friend's Kwak Kyung-taek, Typhoon set a new record in 2005 for the highest production budget in Korean film history at $15 million.

For the next four years, Jang kept a low profile in the Korean entertainment sphere as he worked on his Hollywood debut The Warrior's Way, also starring Kate Bosworth and Geoffrey Rush. The film encountered problems with post-production and distribution, and was only released in 2010.

He returned to the silver screen in 2009 as the nation's youngest (and most eligible) head of state in Jang Jin's comedy Good Morning, President.

He reunited with director Kang Je-gyu in My Way, a film set during World War II based on the true story of a Korean soldier who is drafted by the Japanese army and eventually is present at the Battle of Normandy. A large-scale, ambitious pan-Asian collaboration co-starring Japanese actor Joe Odagiri and Chinese actress Fan Bingbing, My Way was the most expensive Korean movie to date (with an estimated budget of ₩28 billion), But despite being simultaneously released in Korea and Japan in December 2011, the film flopped at the box office.

=== 2012–present: Return to television ===
Jang made his highly anticipated return to television dramas in A Gentleman's Dignity, saying he was drawn to the romantic comedy tale of 40-something-year-old men struggling to grow up and mend and forge lasting relationships. After the series ended, Jang and co-star Kim Min-jong visited refugees in the Republic of the Congo on a mission trip sponsored by UNICEF, UNHCR and World Food Programme. It was televised on SBS documentary program Hope TV.

His 2012 film Dangerous Liaisons was a Chinese adaptation of the French literature classic set in 1930s Shanghai, directed by Hur Jin-ho and co-starring Zhang Ziyi and Cecilia Cheung.

Jang next starred in No Tears for the Dead, an action thriller directed by Lee Jeong-beom. He played a Korean-born American hitman who feels conflicted about killing his last target (played by Kim Min-hee).

In 2015, Jang was cast in the film Seven Years of Night, a revenge thriller based on the novel of the same name by Jung Yoo-jung. He plays a character who takes revenge on his daughter's murderer, by killing his son. The film premiered in 2018.

In 2016, Jang was cast in his first Chinese drama, Once Loved You Distressed Forever alongside actress Tang Yixin. He was then cast in the espionage noir thriller VIP, which premiered in 2017.

Jang returned to the small screen after five years, starring in the Korean remake of the popular American legal drama series Suits (2018). The same year, Jung starred in Kim Sung-hoon's period zombie action film Rampant alongside close friend Hyun Bin.

In 2019, Jang starred in the fantasy historical drama Arthdal Chronicles.

== Personal life ==
Jang is a practicing Buddhist, having first explored Buddhist reading while hospitalized in high school, after undergoing chest surgery.

He enjoys playing baseball and is a member of the celebrity amateur baseball team "Playboys" with Lee Jong-hyuk, Hyun Bin, Kim Seung-woo, Hwang Jung-min, Ji Jin-hee, and other actors.

=== Relationship and marriage ===
The famously private actor surprised the country in November 2009 when he went public with his two-year romance with Ko So-young. Since co-starring together in the 1999 film Love Wind Love Song, rumors about Jang and Ko had spread several times in the past, but both had consistently denied them. The announcement immediately sparked speculation of an impending marriage although it wasn't until March 2010 that Jang officially told his fans at a fan meeting that he would be marrying Ko in May. After months of media frenzy leading up to their nuptials, the two tied the knot on May 2, 2010 in an extravagant wedding ceremony at Seoul's Shilla Hotel which was attended by their A-list celebrity friends, reporters and fans from around the world.

Their son, Jang Min-joon, was born on October 4, 2010. Their second child, a daughter, was born on February 25, 2014.

== Filmography ==
=== Film ===
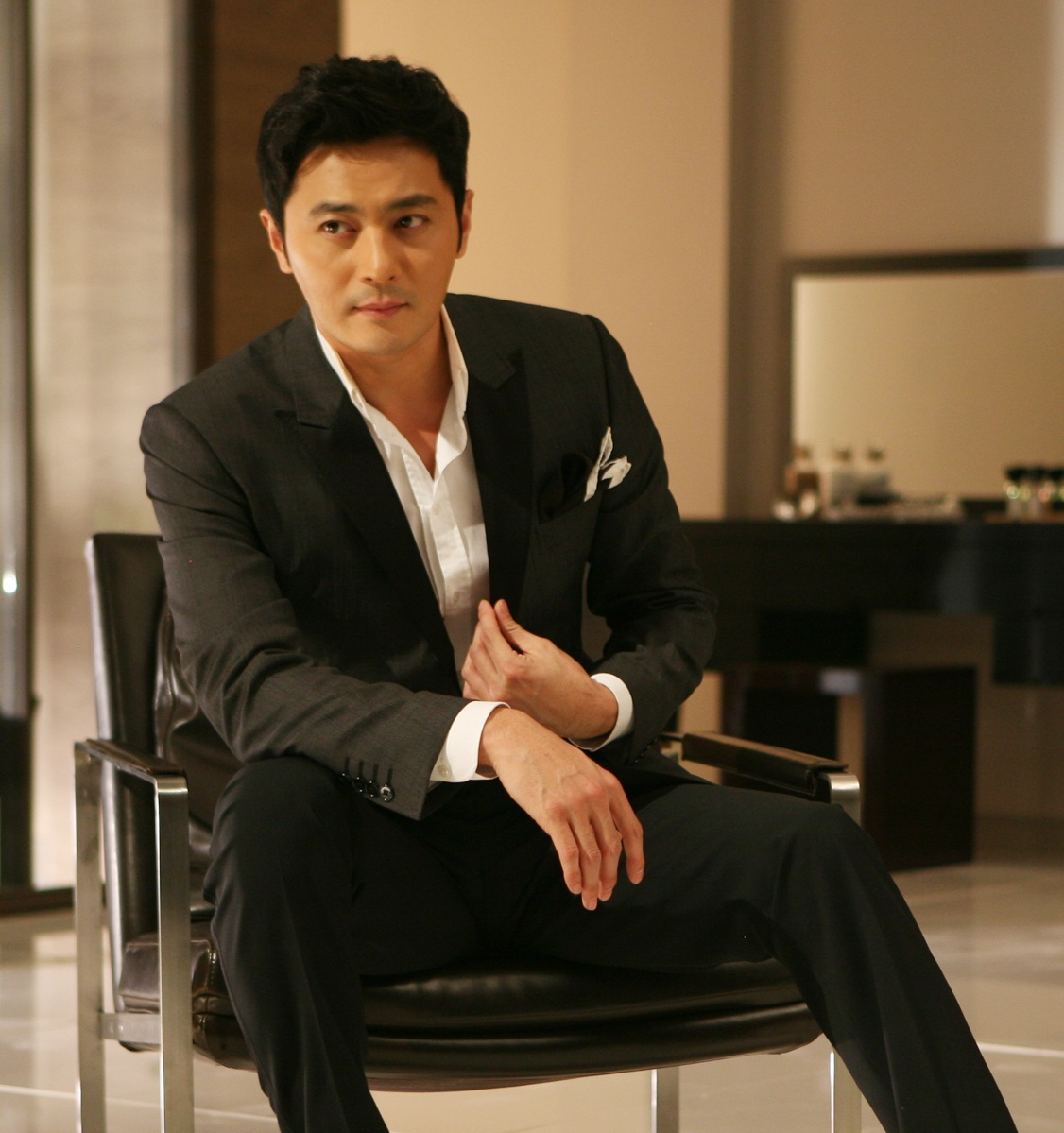
Jang in an LG ad in 2011

Year	Title	Role	Notes	Ref.
1997	Repechage	Min-gyu		
1997	Holiday In Seoul	Taxi driver		
1998	First Kiss	Actor	Cameo	
1999	Love Wind Love Song	Tae-hee		
1999	Nowhere to Hide	Detective Kim		
2000	Anarchists	Sergei		
2001	Friend	Han Dong-su		
2002	2009: Lost Memories	Masayuki Sakamoto		
2002	The Coast Guard	Private Kang		
2004	Taegukgi: The Brotherhood of War	Lee Jin-tae		
2005	Typhoon	Sin		
2005	The Promise	Kunlun	Chinese production	
2009	Good Morning, President	Cha Ji-wook		
2010	The Warrior's Way	Yang	International co-production	
2011	My Way	Kim Jun-sik		
2012	Dangerous Liaisons	Xie Yifan	Chinese production	
2014	No Tears for the Dead	Gon		
2017	V.I.P.	Park Jae-hyuk		
2018	Seven Years of Night	Young-je		
2018	Rampant	Kim Ja-joon		
2023	A Normal Family	Yang Jae-gyu		
TBA	Tropical Night	Baek Do-jun		

=== Television series ===
Year	Title	Role	Notes	Ref.
1992	Our Heaven			
1993	Iljimae	Iljimae		
1994	The Last Match	Yoon Chul-jun		
1996	Icing	Yoon Chan		
1997	Medical Brothers	Kim Su-hyung		
1997	Model	Lee Jung		
1997	Myth of a Hero	Kim Tae-woo		
1998	Ready Go!	Shin Ji-soo		
1998	Love	Jung In-ha		
1999	Springtime	Kang Hyun-woo		
1999	Ghost	Jang Dae-hyup		
2000	All About Eve	Yoon Hyung-chul		
2012	A Gentleman's Dignity	Kim Do-jin		
2018	Suits	Choi Kyung-seo		
2019–2023	Arthdal Chronicles	Ta Gon	Season 1–2	

=== Television shows ===
Year	Title	Role	Notes	Ref.
2022	Back to the Books	Host	Season 2	

== Discography ==
Album information	Track listing
너에게로 가는 길: Track from Our Heaven OST; Released: March 1, 1993; Label: 킹	Track listing: 5. 너에게로 가는 길 - Jang Dong-gun
With Justice And Peace For All: Album; Artist: Jang Dong-gun; Released: June 1993; Label: 킹	Track listing: 1. 우리들의 천국(Main Theme); 2. 너에게로 가는 길(주제곡); 3. 처음느낀 너 4. 내 안에 있는 너 5. 우리들의 천국(Love Theme); 6. 고독 그리고 나 7. 너에게로 가는 길(Remake Dance); 8. 구름과 나 9. 우정; 10. Happy Ending
Friendship: Album; Artists: Jang Dong-gun and Jeon Cheol; Released: June 1994; Label: Asia (Shinchon Music)	Track listing: 1. 그대가 있기에; 2. 나의 친구; 3. 너에겐 너무 미안해; 4. 늘 푸르른 소나무 처럼; 5. 사랑한다는 이유만으로; 6. 슬픈추억; 7. 이제 난 알아; 8. 조금씩
飛翔 (Flying): Album; Artist: Jang Dong-gun; Released: October 1995; Label: Seoul Records	Track listing: 1. 프롤로그-소중한 너에게; 2. 슬픈 발라드; 3. 나만의 착각; 4. SHE SAID 'GOOD BYE'; 5. 연인에게; 6. 부킹; 7. 에덴의 저편; 8. 바람둥이; 9. 밤은 깊은데; 10. 사랑을 내곁에
Bon Seung & Dong Gun: Album; Artists: Goo Bon-seung and Jang Dong-gun; Released: February 12, 1998; Label: Doremi	Track listing: 1. Bach & Andante; 2. 풍경; 3. Love Song (Piano Version); 4. 불멸의 사랑; 5. 동거; 6. Remember; 7. Love Song(Full Version); 8. Bach & Adagio; 9. Remember; 10. 정말 그러길 바랄께; 11. 내안에 있는 너 12. 풍경 Repeat; 13. 풍경 Repeat & B.T
정말 그러길 바랄께: Track from Dong Gam: Sympathy 1970~2001. June; Released: June 22, 2001; Label: One Entertainment (Sony Music Korea)	Track listing Disc 1 - 1. 정말 그러길 바랄께 - Jang Dong-gun
과거는 흘러갔다 (From Film): Track from The Coast Guard OST; Released: November 13, 2002; Label: DreamBeat	Track listing: 9. 과거는 흘러갔다 (From Film) - Jang Dong-gun
We Online: Actor's Choice: Single; Released: March 5, 2010; Label: A&G Modes	Track listing: 1. 우리 (We) - Gong Hyung-jin, Kim Seung-woo, Lee Ha-na, Jang Dong-gun, Ji Jin-hee, Hwang Jung-min; 2. 우리 (We) (Inst.)
나보다 더 (More Than Me): Single from A Gentleman's Dignity OST 2; Released: July 27, 2012; Label: CJ E&M	Track listing: 1. 나보다 더 (More Than Me) - Jang Dong-gun

== Accolades ==
=== Awards and nominations ===
Year presented, name of the award ceremony, award category, nominated work and the result of the nomination
Year	Award	Category	Nominated work	Result	Ref.
1993	29th Baeksang Arts Awards	Best New Actor – Television	Our Heaven	Nominated	
1993	MBC Drama Awards	Best New Actor	Our Heaven, Iljimae	Nominated	
1994	30th Baeksang Arts Awards	Best New Actor – Television	The Last Match	Won	
1994	MBC Drama Awards	Excellence Award, Actor	The Last Match	Nominated	
1996	MBC Drama Awards	Excellence Award, Actor	Icing	Nominated	
1997	18th Blue Dragon Film Awards	Best New Actor	Repechage	Won	
1997	33rd Baeksang Arts Awards	Most Popularity Award, Actor – Television	Medical Brothers	Won	
1997	MBC Drama Awards	Top Excellence Award, Actor	Medical Brothers	Won	
1999	20th Blue Dragon Film Awards	Best Supporting Actor	Nowhere to Hide	Won	
2000	37th Grand Bell Awards	Best Supporting Actor	Nowhere to Hide	Nominated	
2000	21st Blue Dragon Film Awards	Popular Star Award	Anarchists	Won	
2000	MBC Drama Awards	Top Excellence Award, Actor	All About Eve	Nominated	
2001	46th Asia-Pacific Film Festival	Best Supporting Actor	Friend	Won	
2001	22nd Blue Dragon Film Awards	Popular Star Award	Friend	Won	
2001	22nd Blue Dragon Film Awards	Best Actor	Friend	Nominated	
2002	23rd Blue Dragon Film Awards	Best Actor	The Coast Guard	Nominated	
2003	40th Grand Bell Awards	Best Actor	The Coast Guard	Nominated	
2003	2nd Korean Film Awards	Best Actor	The Coast Guard	Nominated	
2004	40th Baeksang Arts Awards	Best Actor – Film	Taegukgi: The Brotherhood of War	Nominated	
2004	41st Grand Bell Awards	Best Actor	Taegukgi: The Brotherhood of War	Nominated	
2004	25th Blue Dragon Film Awards	Best Actor	Taegukgi: The Brotherhood of War	Won	
2005	2nd Max Movie Awards	Best Actor	Taegukgi: The Brotherhood of War	Won	
2006	43rd Grand Bell Awards	Best Actor	Typhoon	Nominated	
2007	15th Chunsa Film Art Awards	Hallyu Arts Award	—N/a	Won	
2007	Korea TV Advertising Festival	Best Couple Award (with Soo Ae)	—N/a	Won	
2007	Korean Entertainment Industry Society	Star (Movie) Award	—N/a	Won	
2009	46th Savings Day	President's Commendation	—N/a	Won	
2009	30th Blue Dragon Film Awards	Best Actor	Good Morning, President	Nominated	
2012	5th Style Icon Awards	Top 10 Style Icons	—N/a	Won	
2012	5th Style Icon Awards	Style Icon of the Year	—N/a	Won	
2012	SBS Drama Awards	Top 10 Stars	A Gentleman's Dignity	Won	
2012	SBS Drama Awards	Top Excellence Award, Actor in a Weekend/Serial Drama	A Gentleman's Dignity	Won	
2017	5th Marie Claire Asia Star Awards	Actor of the Year	V.I.P.	Won	
2018	2018 Korea Best Star Awards	Best Actor	Seven Years of Night	Won	
2018	KBS Drama Awards	Grand Prize (Daesang)	Suits	Nominated	
2018	KBS Drama Awards	Top Excellence Award, Actor	Suits	Nominated	
2018	KBS Drama Awards	Excellence Award, Actor in a Miniseries	Suits	Won	
2018	KBS Drama Awards	Netizen Award	Suits	Nominated	
2019	4th Asia Artist Awards	Grand Prize (Daesang)	Arthdal Chronicles	Won	
2025	18th Asian Film Awards	Excellence in Asian Cinema Award	—N/a	Honored	
2025	34th Buil Film Awards	Yu Hyun-mok Film Art Award	A Normal Family	Won	

=== Listicles ===
Name of publisher, year listed, name of listicle, and placement
Publisher	Year	Listicle	Placement	Ref.
Forbes	2010	Korea Power Celebrity 40	34th	
Forbes	2011	Korea Power Celebrity 40	25th	
Forbes	2014	Korea Power Celebrity 40	37th	
