= Park Heung-sik =

Park Heung-sik (also spelled Park Heung-shik) may refer to:

- Park Heung-sik (born 1962), South Korean film director and screenwriter
- Park Heung-sik (born 1965), South Korean film director and screenwriter
