= Sohn Kee-chung Park =

Park in Seoul, South Korea

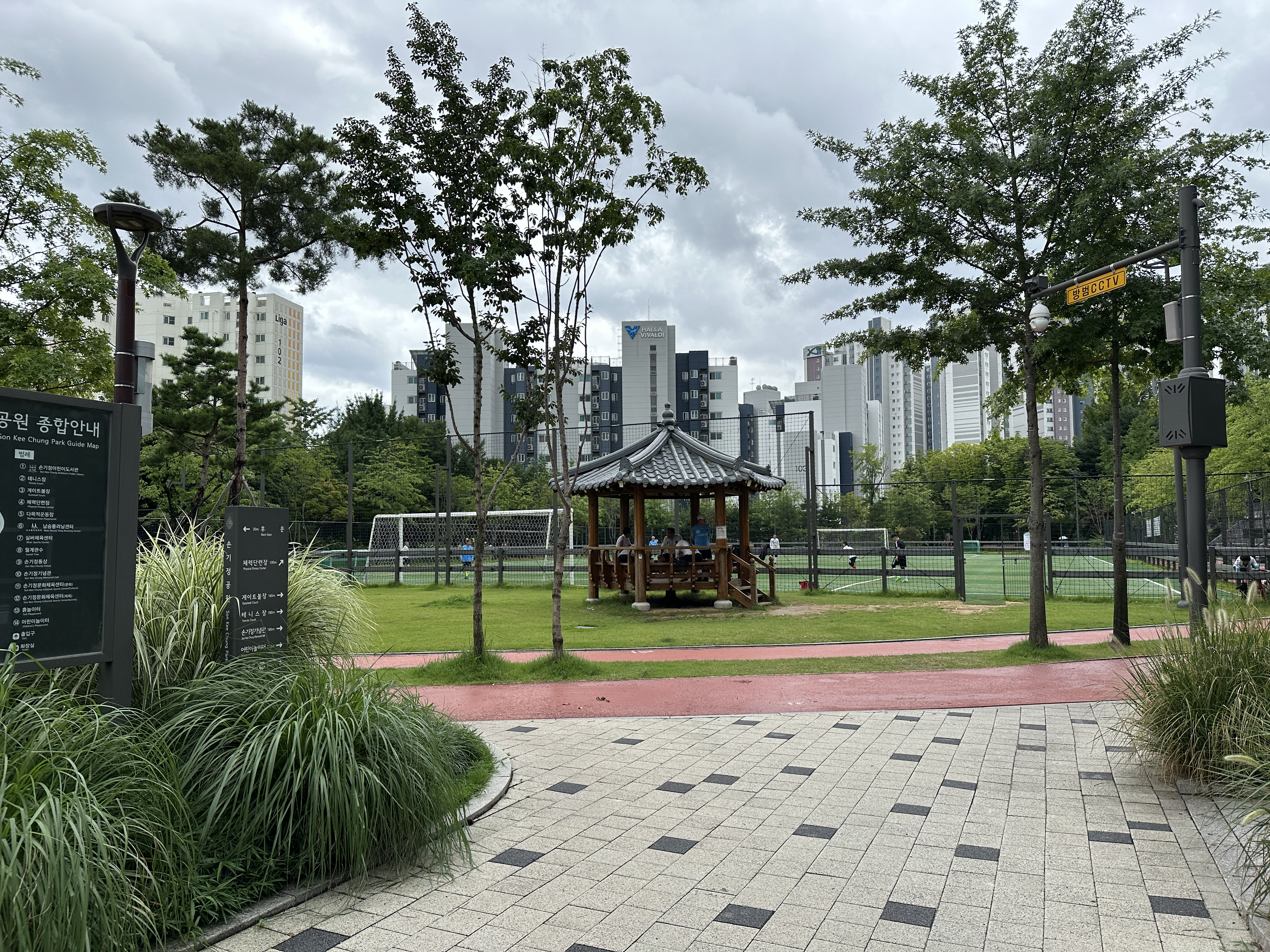
- Part of the park (2024)
- Interactive map of Sohn Kee-chung Park
- Location: Malli-dong, Jung District, Seoul, South Korea
- Coordinates: 37.5559°N 126.9655°E

Sohn Kee-chung Park (Korean: 손기정공원; Hanja: 孫基禎公園) is a public park in Malli-dong, Jung District, Seoul, South Korea. It is named for Sohn Kee-chung, the first Korean to win an Olympic gold medal. It was established in 1987 and remodeled in 2020. The park is popular for sports, and contains a number of facilities for not only running, but also soccer, tennis, volleyball, and basketball. A statue of Sohn is located near a running track in the park.

The park also contains a Sohn Kee-chung Children's Library and Sohn Kee-chung Cultural Library (손기정문화도서관), as well as the Sohn Kee-chung Memorial Hall. A cafe is located in the memorial hall. General use of the facilities is encouraged, with comfortable seats, desks, and tables available in significant quantities. A tree given to Sohn in the name of Adolf Hitler, who hosted the 1936 Summer Olympics where Sohn won his gold medal, is now located in the park.

== Gallery ==
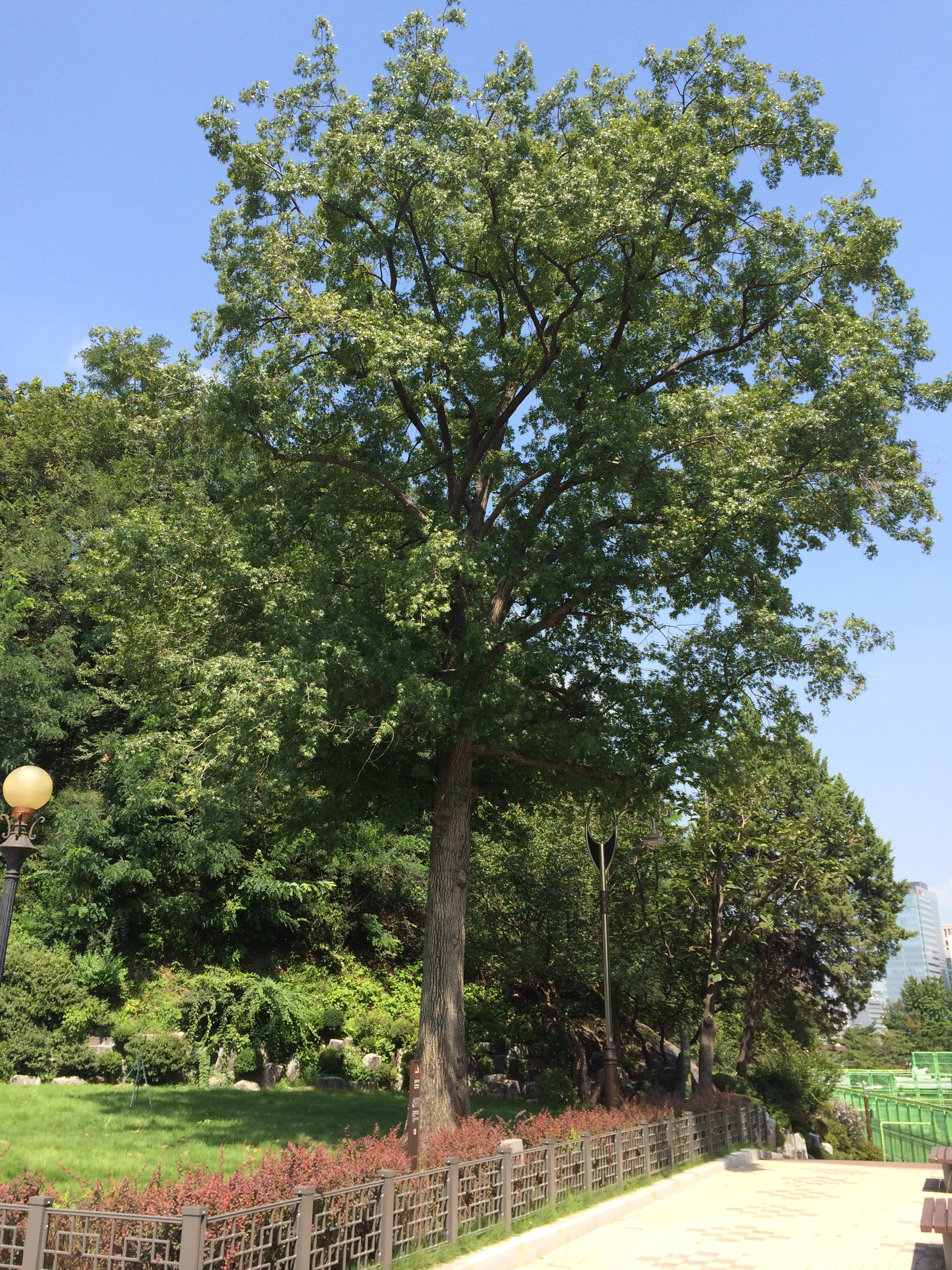
The tree in the park, given to Sohn in the name of Adolf Hitler (2014)
