= Dangerous Liaisons (2012 film) =

2012 film by Hur Jin-ho

- Film poster
- Directed by: Hur Jin-ho
- Screenplay by: Yan Geling
- Based on: Les Liaisons dangereuses by Pierre Choderlos de Laclos
- Produced by: Chen Weiming
- Starring: Zhang Ziyi; Jang Dong-gun; Cecilia Cheung
- Cinematography: Kim Byeong-seo
- Edited by: Nam Na-yeong
- Music by: Jo Seong-woo
- Distributed by: Zonbo Media
- Release dates: May 24, 2012 (Cannes - Directors' Fortnight); September 27, 2012 (China); October 11, 2012 (South Korea)
- Running time: 110 minutes
- Country: China
- Language: Mandarin
- Budget: CN¥150 million ₩40 billion US$24.2 million

Dangerous Liaisons (Chinese: 危險關係) is a 2012 Chinese period romance drama film by Hur Jin-ho loosely based on the 1782 novel with the same title by Pierre Choderlos de Laclos. The novel has been adapted numerous times, including Les Liaisons dangereuses, an adaptation by Roger Vadim (1959), the eponymous Hollywood film (1988), Valmont (1989), Cruel Intentions (1999), and Untold Scandal from South Korea (2003).

This version is set in 1930s Shanghai and stars South Korean actor Jang Dong-gun and Chinese actresses Zhang Ziyi and Cecilia Cheung.

The film screened in the Directors' Fortnight section at the 2012 Cannes Film Festival, the 2012 Toronto International Film Festival, and the 2012 Busan International Film Festival.

== Plot ==
Shanghai, September 1931: Wealthy businessman and playboy seducer Xie Yifan is introduced to his uncle's granddaughter, Du Fenyu, when his maternal grandmother, Du Ruixue, arrives at his apartment one day. Fenyu, a young widow who has just arrived from Northeast China (aka Manchuria) where the Japanese are making incursions, is staying at the country home of Madam Du, her grand-aunt.

At a glitzy fund-raiser for refugees thrown by Hudong Bank chairwoman Mo Jieyu at Yifan's nightclub, Jieyu, an old friend of Yifan who has never succumbed to his advances, asks him to rob Beibei, the 16-year-old fiancée of tycoon Jin Zhihuan, of her virginity. Jieyu wants revenge on Jin, for publicly dumping her in favor of a schoolgirl. Yifan turns down Jieyu's request, partly because he has another quarry in his sights on the quiet and retiring Fenyu. Sensing an opportunity for some sport, Jieyu makes Yifan a wager: if he can seduce Fenyu without falling in love, she will finally agree to have sex with him; if he fails, he will sign over a valuable piece of land to her. Yifan accepts the challenge, but finds the virtuous Fenyu apparently immune to his charms.

Meanwhile, Jieyu employs a different strategy to get her revenge on Jin, encouraging an attraction between Beibei and her young drawing teacher, college student Dai Wenzhou. Despite Jieyu's strenuous efforts, the relationship is never consummated; but when she finds out about it, Beibei's mother, Mrs. Zhu, forbids her daughter to see Wenzhou anymore. With time running out, Jieyu suggests to Mrs. Zhu that Beibei should spend some quiet time at Madam Du's estate—and secretly arranges for Yifan to be there, to "comfort" Beibei. His mission finally accomplished, Yifan refocuses on seducing Fenyu, but finds himself in deeper emotional waters than he has ever experienced.

During one night, a drunken Yifan approaches Jieyu, but realizes she is entangled in a relationship with Wenzhou. He sleeps on Jieyu's bed and calls out Fenyu's name, when Jieyu realizes he has fallen in love with the latter. The next morning, Jieyu uses an opportunity to call Fenyu over to embarrass Yifan, and when facing her, he claims that he grew tired of Fenyu, and was nothing more than a gambling bet. Heartbroken, she leaves. Yifan, feeling that his advances have won over Jieyu, celebrates his victory, but Jieyu turns him down and mocks him for thinking so. Enraged, he leaves and swears he will break Jieyu's heart. Jieyu then tells Wenzhou about Beibei's seduction. Eventually, Fenyu's absence causes Yifan regret, and he is on his way to Fenyu's house when he is shot by Wenzhou, who has realized the truth. Wounded, he finds Fenyu, who is about to commit suicide in her house, and begs to let her see him in desperation. She speaks of death ending their agony, but does not open the door until Yifan begins leaving. She reaches him collapsed outside in the snow, bleeding. He asks if she still wishes him dead; mutely, she shakes her head 'no.' She holds him as he dies in her arms, and wails to the sky.

One year later, Fenyu becomes involved in charitable causes to educate children, while Yifan's death brings guilt and sorrow to a mourning Jieyu.

== Cast ==
- Zhang Ziyi as Du Fenyu (Tourvel)
- Jang Dong-gun as Xie Yifan (Valmont)
- Cecilia Cheung as Mo Jieyu (Merteuil)
- Shawn Dou as Dai Wenzhou (Danceny)
- Lisa Lu as Madam Du Ruixue (Rosemond)
- Rong Rong as Mrs. Zhu (Madame de Volonges)
- Candy Wang as Beibei, Mrs. Zhu's daughter (Cecile)
- Ye Xiangming as Wu Shaopu, the demonstrator
- Xiao Shuli as Gui Zhen
- Zhang Yun as Wen, Mrs. Zhu's maid
- Wu Fang as Hong, Jieyu's maid
- Chen Guodong as Gen
- Zhang Han as Jin Zhihuan
- Xue Wei as young lady
- Hao Yifei as teacher
- Zong Xiaojun as police captain
- Yang Fan as policeman
- Gang Xiaoxi as dance girl
- Zhang Zichen as Cai Lu, Yifan's driver
- Piao Yanni as make-up woman
- Yan Hongyu as photographer
- Jiang Yiyi as manicure maid
- Dong Hailong as reporter
- Son Seong-jae as saxophonist
- Leng Haiming as art director
- Yang Chen as MC
- Xiang Dong as lawyer
- Yin Yanbin as Japanese officer
- Jean Favie "Ji En" as the French tailor
- Li Shiping as young street beggar
