= The Twins (2005 film) =

- Theatrical poster
- Hangul: 역전의 명수
- RR: Yeokjeonui myeongsu
- MR: Yŏkchŏnŭi myŏngsu
- Directed by: Park Heung-sik
- Written by: Park Heung-sik
- Produced by: Chung Tae-won
- Starring: Jung Joon-ho; Yoon So-yi
- Cinematography: Jeong Han-cheol
- Edited by: Park Gok-ji; Jeong Jin-hee
- Music by: Lee Dong-joon
- Production company: Taewon Entertainment
- Distributed by: Cinema Service
- Release date: April 15, 2005
- Running time: 122 minutes
- Country: South Korea
- Language: Korean

The Twins (Korean: 역전의 명수; RR: Yeokjeonui myeongsu) is a 2005 South Korean film and the debut feature of Park Heung-sik. Jung Joon-ho stars as identical twins with opposing personalities.

== Plot ==
Myung-su and Hyung-su are identical twins with opposing personalities. Hyung-su graduated top of his class in high school and is on his way to Seoul University to study law, supported by his mother, who runs a hole-in-the-wall restaurant near a train station. By contrast, Myung-su works as a bouncer at a local brothel and helps out in his mother's restaurant, but is happy to trade places with his brother whenever there is trouble. The two brothers have their lives turned upside down when Hyung-su is accused of a crime.

== Cast ==
- Jung Joon-ho as Myung-su/Hyung-su
- Yoon So-yi
- Kim Hye-na
- Park Jung-soo
- Park No-sik
- Myeong Kye-nam
- Park Sang-wook
- Oh Su-min

== Production ==
Jung Joon-ho took on the dual role of Myung-su and Hyung-su to further his skills as an actor, and said, "When I read the script, I really liked the story and wanted to star in the film... I begged the director to choose me". He prepared himself by studying the performances of other actors playing double roles in films, such as Jeon Do-yeon in My Mother, the Mermaid and Park Shin-yang in The Big Swindle. Prior to the launch of the film, Jung noted that he focused more on the character of Myung-su, feeling that the personality of Hyung-su was expressed less fully than he intended.

== Release ==
The Twins opened in South Korea on 15 April 2005, and was ranked second at the Seoul box office on its opening weekend with 42,535 admissions. The film went on to accumulate a total of 602,078 admissions nationwide.

Joon Soh of The Korea Times regarded the film's storyline as a variation of Mark Twain's 1881 novel The Prince and the Pauper, and found the film to have "a surprising amount of tension due to its numerous plot twists and unexpected character development". However, Joon also commented that the film tried to fit too much story into its runtime, "[leaving] behind too many loose ends while rushing to its halfhearted ending".
