= Apolônio de Carvalho =

Brazilian military officer (1912–2005)

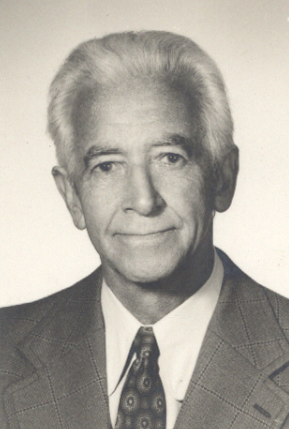
- Born: 9 February 1912; Corumbá (Mato Grosso), Brazil
- Died: 23 September 2005 (aged 93); Rio de Janeiro, Brazil
- Spouse: Renée de Carvalho
- Children: René Luis de Carvalho; Raul de Carvalho
- Military career
- Allegiance: Brazil; Foreign volunteers Free France
- Branch: Brazilian Army; International Brigades; French Army
- Service years: 1932–1936 (Brazilian Army); 1937–1939 (International Brigades); 1940–1945 (French Army)
- Rank: Lieutenant (Brazil); Captain (Spain); Colonel (France)
- Conflicts: Spanish Civil War; French Resistance
- Awards: Legion of Honour
- Other work: Vice President of the Workers' Party (Brazil)

Apolônio de Carvalho (9 February 1912 – 23 September 2005) was a Brazilian socialist and military officer important in the history of the Workers' Party (Brazil). Due to his communist ideals, Carvalho was expelled from the Brazilian Army and left for Spain to fight alongside the republicans in the Spanish Civil War and afterwards against the Nazis in occupied France, reaching the rank of colonel in the French Army. Considered a hero in France, he was awarded the Legion of Honour among other decorations for bravery.

== Biography ==
Carvalho was born in Mato Grosso into a military family of working-class origin. His father was from northeastern Brazil and his mother was a gaucha from the south of the country. At the age of 18 he joined a military school and became an officer, but his sympathy for the common people led him to take part in an unsuccessful insurrection with the Allianca Nacional Libertadora, which he had joined in 1935. He was arrested and imprisoned, and upon his release in 1937 he became a member of the Brazilian Communist Party.

Soon after his release Carvalho joined the International Brigades in Spain, thus using his military training to fight fascism. In 1939, after General Francisco Franco's victory, he fled to France and soon became involved with the French Resistance. Though he was at one time captured and tortured by the Gestapo, he later escaped and became a colonel leading 2000 men, and at the end of the War was awarded the Legion of Honour.

Carvalho returned to Brazil and partook in an attempt to depose dictator Getuilo Vargas, and was subsequently stripped of his position as lieutenant in the Brazilian Army. After the 1964 military coup he criticised the Brazilian Communist Party for refusing to engage in guerilla warfare, as well as for their authoritarian and instrumental methods. In 1967 he was finally expelled and founded the Brazilian Revolutionary Communist Party a year later to continue armed struggle against the dictatorship. He was arrested and tortured, but released and sent into exile in Algeria in 1970 in exchange for Ehrenfried von Holleben, the German ambassador who had been taken hostage by leftist guerillas. In 1979 Carvalho returned to Brazil as the military dictatorship had become weaker, and took part in forming the Workers' Party (PT) the following year. He was also for a time its vice president.

He died in 2005, at a time when his party was in power but had accommodated neo-liberal economics and was accused of corruption. The week he died, many members of the Workers' Party were tearing up their membership cards – of which his was the first (0001). He himself, however, believed that the party could be reclaimed.

== See also ==
- Suresh Biswas
- Charlie Hutchison
- Joseph Beyrle
- Yang Kyoungjong
