= AFC Anthem =

Anthem of the Asian Football Confederation

- Corporate anthem of AFC
- Music: Lee Dong-june, 2014
- Adopted: 2015 AFC Asian Cup

The "AFC Anthem" is played at the beginning of football matches and tournaments organised by the Asian Football Confederation (AFC) since the 2015 AFC Asian Cup, usually as players enter the field.

== History ==
Lee Dong-june composed this anthem in 2014.

It was first played at the 2015 AFC Asian Cup, specifically in the opening match between hosts Australia and Kuwait. Before 2015, AFC-structured football matches and tournaments adopted the FIFA Anthem.

== See also ==
- Anthems of international organizations
- Zadok the Priest, the UEFA anthem
