= The Gingko Bed =

- South Korean poster
- Hangul: 단적비연수
- RR: Danjeokbiyeonsu
- MR: Tanjŏkpiyŏnsu
- Directed by: Kang Je-gyu
- Screenplay by: Kang Je-gyu
- Produced by: Shin Chul; Han Jin
- Cinematography: Park Hui-ju
- Edited by: Park Gok-ji
- Music by: Lee Dong-jun
- Production company: Shin Cine Communications
- Release date: February 17, 1996 (South Korea)
- Running time: 87 minutes
- Country: South Korea
- Language: Korean
- Budget: $3.5 million

The Gingko Bed (Korean: 은행나무 침대; lit. 'ginkgo tree bed') is a 1996 South Korean fantasy film directed by Kang Je-gyu.

== Plot ==
At a place where two ginkgo trees once stood, a city now exists. General Hwang, a spirit from the distant past, appears in the modern day. He stops a rapist in an alley, pulling his still-beating heart out of his chest.

So-hyun wants to marry his girlfriend Dr. Ryu, but she thinks that they are happy the way they are and says that it is time to get a bed. So-hyun dreams that he is walking the streets at night when he sees a woman in old-fashioned clothing before a bed falls on him. Walking down an alley similar to the one in his dream, So-hyun finds a bed carved out of a tree and has it brought back to his apartment using moving equipment due to its weight. He proudly tells Dr. Ryu that he got a big new bed, but when she finds out he got it at a flea market, she angrily tells him to throw it out.

In a live drawing class he instructs, So-hyun ignores the live model and sketches a portrait of the woman he saw in his dream. After class, he walks through her visage, unable to see her in his waking state. She attempts to get his attention, but she is unable to make physical contact with him as he walks through her. The woman lies in the body Young-cheol, a man dying in the hospital, and borrows his life force in order to become physically palpable.

General Hwang finds the bed in So-hyun's apartment. As So-hyun is returning home, the woman pulls him away from the door and saves him from being discovered by General Hwang, who finds So-hyun's sketch of the woman and recognizes her, then chases them onto the roof. The woman jumps off of the roof holding him and gracefully glides with him onto the roof of a passing truck. She explains that the man is the ghost of General Hwang and has been wandering around for 170 years since the bed was carved. She reveals that her name is Mi-dan, then returns to the hospital so that tYoung-cheol will not die. Young-cheol has already been pronounced dead, and his eyes have been transplanted to another person. Young-cheol's brother threatens to sue Dr. Ryu, whom he blames for his brother's death.

General Hwang man is heartbroken that Mi-dan is confusing So-hyun for her former lover Jung-mun. Young-cheol suddenly returns to life. Mi-dan inhabits another man's body and changes her appearance to resemble So-hyun, then lies down on the bed. General Hwang uses a statue to smash the head of the man in the bed. So-hyun enters and sees this, then flees to the home of Dr. Ryu, who doesn't believe him. So-hyun has a dream in which General Hwang is cutting off his arms. Dr. Ryu is browbeaten by the superintendent to leave the hospital for good.

So-hyun finds a carver who is the great-great-grandson of the man who originally carved the bed from a gingko tree on which General Hwang had laid a curse. He explains that Mi-dan and General Hwang were given eternal life by the spirits of good and evil. His great-great-grandfather carved their faces into the bed, hoping that they would be in love forever. When Mi-dan caused the man to die in order to save So-hyun, the spirit of love left her, so So-hyun can never see her again. So-hyun asks about Jung-mun. The carver says that So-hyun was a great musician in his previous life as Jung-mun 1,000 years earlier, and that his music was the music of the angels. The carver explains that General Hwang started a war over Mi-dan, but she never opened her heart to his selfish and possessive love. Instead, she loved Jung-mun, her childhood love. General Hwang beheaded Jung-mun, and Mi-dan killed herself. In their next reincarnation, General Hwang found them again and beheaded Jung-mun's reincarnation, then Mi-dan's reincarnation starved to death holding his severed head. After their death, the god of love turned Mi-dan and Jung-mun into 2 gingko trees to bring them together forever. General Hwang returned as a hawk and cursed Jung-mun's tree, causing it to be struck by lightning and destroyed.

Young-cheol tells Dr. Ryu that a woman wearing a medieval dress inhabited his body and then left him before he died. Mi-dan tells the carver to tell So-hyun to burn the bed and not return to his studio. Mi-dan intends to stop General Hwang. The carver tells So-hyun that if he burns the bed, Mi-dan will ascend to Heaven. Mi-dan tells General Hwang that she will go with him if he lets her see So-hyun one last time. If he does not, she insists that she will never give her soul to him. General Hwang has already killed both of them twice before, and she knows that he will continue to do it.

General Hwang enters Dr. Ryu's body and tells So-hyun that Mi-dan will visit him once more during the lunar eclipse that night. He says that So-hyun must send her back to General Hwang before the end of the eclipse or Dr. Ryu will fall into a coma and never recover. Sun-young says that she will go to the hospital and allow Mi-dan to use her body to see So-hyun one last time, believing that her death and resurrection will help her get her medical license back. So-hyun tries to stop her in order to protect her, but she insists on going, saying that she won't die so easily. At the hospital, the superintendent watches as she suddenly dies when the lunar eclipse begins. So-hyun goes to his studio and sees Mi-dan one last time. She states that she has been in the bed for 170 years. Mi-dan and So-hyun kiss, then she tries to leave, but So-hyun refuses to let go as the eclipse ends. The superintendent declares her deceased and orders her body to be sent to the morgue. General Hwang takes control of the body of one of the doctors and slits the superintendent's throat. General Hwang then approaches Sun-young's body, saying that So-hyun has broken his promise.

General Hwang finds So-hyun in his studio and tells him to get away from the bed. So-hyun says that Mi-dan is not in the bed, but rather in his heart. General Hwang fights So-hyun. As they fight, Sun-young returns and sets fire to the bed. General Hwang marches into the fire and allows himself to be burned.

The carver has died, but his apprentice gifts So-hyun the last instrument his master made as per his master's wishes. So-hyun begins to skillfully play music with it.

== Cast ==
- Han Suk-kyu as Sue-hyun
- Shim Hye-jin as Sun-young
- Jin Hee-kyung as Mi-dan
- Shin Hyun-joon as General Hwang
- Kim Hak-cheol as Hospital Director
- Kim Myeong-gook as Jin Myeong
- Ryu Sun-cheol as Old Musician
- Ji Chun-seong as Old Musician's Apprentice
- Choi Hak-rak as Young-cheol's Younger Brother
- Hong Sung-duk as Young-cheol
- Lee Yil-soo as Su-cheol
- Kim Hui-cheol as Fellow Instructor
- Park Dong-bin as Crazy Guy
- Bae Jang-soo as Association executive
- Lee Beom-soo as Junior
- Song Mi-nam as Old Woman
- Actor as Truck Driver
- Lee Wang-gu as Doctor
- Lee Kwang-ho as Doctor
- Hwang Chang-seon as Doctor
- Kim Ji-won as Doctor
- Lee Hyun-jeong as Nurse
- Jang Su-jeong as Reporter
- Choi Il-soon as Experienced Person
- Yu Hye-seon as Experienced Person
- Jang Do-sun as Experienced Person
- Lee Ji-hyoung as Experienced Person
- Kim In-seop as Experienced Person
- Jo Han-hui as Experienced Person
- Kim Sun-kyung as Experienced Person
- Choe Woo-jin as Reporter
- Kim So-jeong as Reporter
- Lee Gi-ho as Reporter
- Song Jae-beom as C.T. Reporter
- K.C. Park as C.T. Reporter
- Kim Da-yeong as Young Mi-dan
- Sin So-mi as the Queen
- Gu Gyeong-eun as Court Lady
- Lee Ho-jin as Gayageum Player
- Yu Yeon-su as Young-cheol's Brother

== Production ==
The film was shot entirely on location in South Korea.

== Release ==
The Gingko Bed was released on February 17, 1996. Though the tree is called the ginkgo tree, the English-language releases of the film consistently use the misspelling "gingko" in the title and subtitles of the film, as does its prequel The Legend of Gingko.

== Prequel ==
The Gingko Bed was followed by a prequel titled The Legend of Gingko (Korean: 은행나무 침대2: 단적비연수; lit. 'The Gingko Bed 2: The Legend of Gingko') in 2000. The prequel tells the story of a general's possessive love 1,000 years earlier that mirrors the story of General Hwang and Mi-dan. Following the release of The Legend of Gingko, The Gingko Bed was released under the title Legend of Gingko 2 in some regions.

== Accolades ==
Kang Je-gyu won the 1996 Blue Dragon Film Award for Best New Director along with Hong Sang-soo for The Day a Pig Fell into the Well.

Kang Je-gyu won the 1996 Grand Bell Award for Best New Director.

The Gingko Bed won Best Film of the Year and Kang Je-gyu won New Director of the Year at the 2nd Cine21 Film Awards.

== Reception ==
In a review for asianstudies.org, adjunct professor Diane Carson wrote, "Grisly horror, flashy special effects, jagged editing, and an energetically moving camera result in awkward juxtapositions of spiritual beliefs with a visceral cinematic style. Fast-paced and emotionally aggressive, technique often overwhelms substance. And despite its effective and harmonious blend of traditional and contemporary music, The Gingko Bed frequently fails to achieve a thematically satisfying union of violent and mythic content. That is, the story repeatedly foregrounds loud verbal and fierce physical battles, all but eclipsing the fascinating legend and intriguing cultural content, including a brief funeral scene, a group of individuals testifying to transmigration, a 'cultural property' monument to the destroyed gingko, glimpses of musical training and performing, and superb music."

The review on braineater.com reads, "The Gingko Bed is a mess. There are few other competently-made movies I've ever seen that could match this one for moments of jaw-dropping incomprehension. I found myself thinking often of Lucio Fulci's City of the Living Dead, a movie that has similarly astonishing lapses in logic and continuity." The review concludes, "The whole movie would be much more powerful if we were given a chance to identify with its protagonists. [...] Gingko Bed behaves as though it's a character and story-driven movie, while falling far short of its stated intentions."

Reviewer Paul Bramhall of cityonfire.com wrote, "In short, The Gingko Bed plays hard and fast with logic, and demands that as an audience we don’t ask too many questions." The review concludes, "If you're willing to forgive a number of plot holes and lapses in logic, The Gingko Bed offers up an entertaining slice of mid-90's Korean cinema, wearing both its Hong Kong and Hollywood influences on its sleeve, and almost pulling them off."

Reviewer Gilroy of lovehkfilm.com wrote, "The Gingko Bed is by no means an excellent film, as the shoddiness of the costumes, mostly unsuccesful [sic] acting, and mishmash of genres detract from the film. However, if the film is viewed as a silly fantasy flick (in other words: not taken seriously), it is highly amusing. The Gingko Bed is a nice escape from the American blockbuster rehash that is so typical of current Korean cinema (Shiri, Tell Me Something), and offers two hours of interesting, original entertainment."

Reviewer James of heroic-cinema.com gave the film a rating of 7 out of 10, writing, "The Gingko Bed is by no means a classic of Korean cinema, but it is a reasonably successful and enjoyable merger of horror with sword and sorcery type fantasy. The special effects may look dated, but they certainly have a function beyond interfering with the plot in order to steal the attention of the eye and, presumably, the viewer’s sense of story comprehension. Kang, who studied film in New York, clearly demonstrates that he knows how and when to deploy a visually sensational moment, but he manages to tell a pretty captivating yarn while he’s at it. Unfortunately this is a talent he seems to have progressively ignored as he works his way closer and closer to his preferred final destination of Hollywood."

Reviewer Panos Kotzathanasis of hancinema.net wrote, "Considered one of the first Korean films to implement special effects in a way that added to its value, 'The Gingko Bed' is also story of eternal love that suffers, however, from a rather faulty narrative." The review concludes, "Kang Je-gyu did not have yet the command of the medium he presented in his next, blockbuster films, but his knack for popular cinema is evidently even here. The film is not exactly bad, but it would have been much better if he was sure about what he wanted to do exactly."
