= Yang Kyoungjong =

Purported Korean soldier (fl. 20th century)

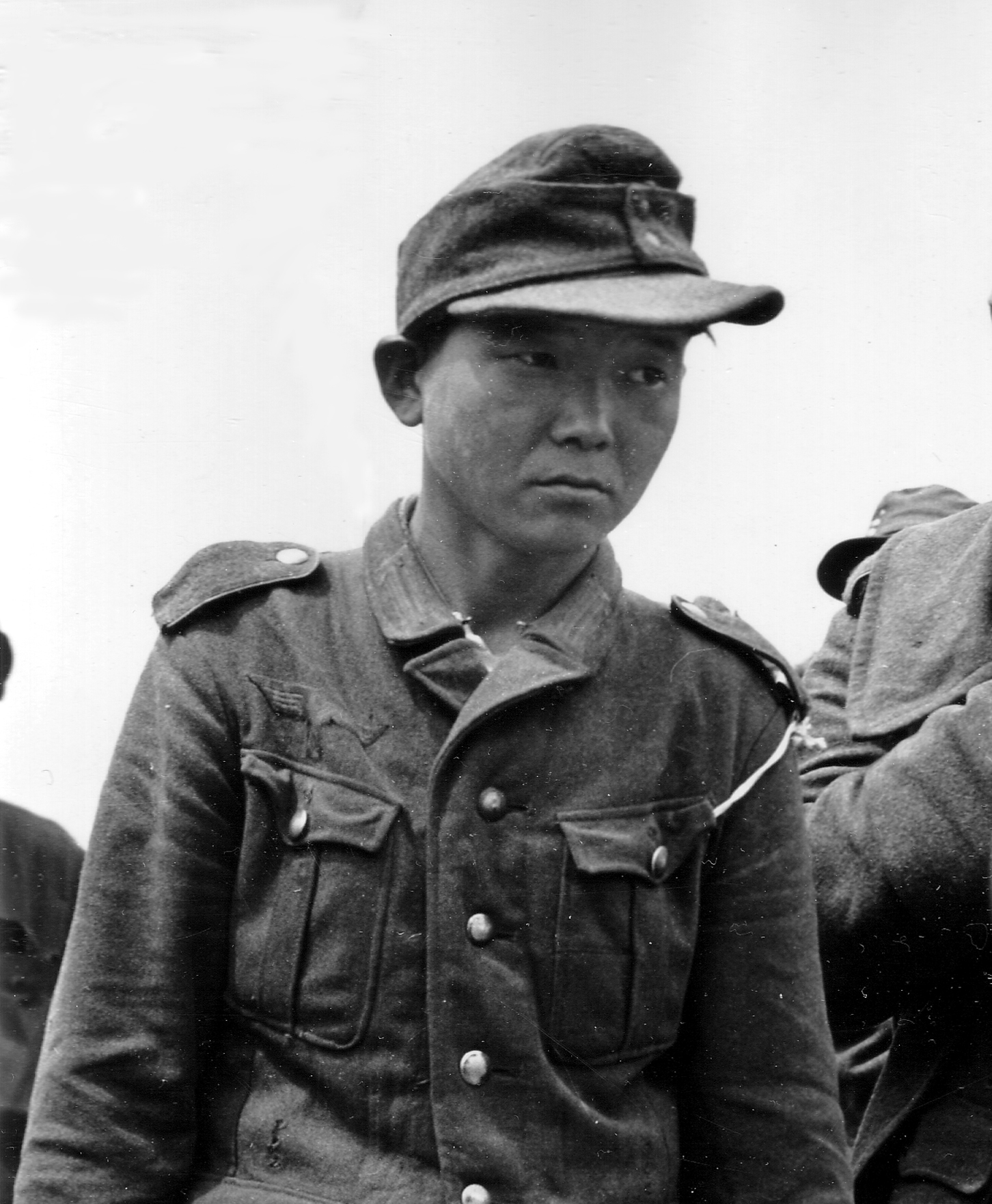
- 1944 photo of a German POW often claimed to be of Yang
- Military career
- Allegiance: Japan; Soviet Union; Nazi Germany
- Branch: Imperial Japanese Army; Red Army; German Army
- Service years: 1938–1939 (IJA); 1942–1943 (Red Army); 1943–1944 (Wehrmacht Heer)
- Conflicts: Battles of Khalkhin Gol; World War II; Third Battle of Kharkov; Operation Overlord

Korean name
- Hangul: 양경종
- RR: Yang Gyeongjong
- MR: Yang Kyŏngjong

Japanese name
- Kana: ヤン・キョンジョン
- Romanization: Yan Kyonjon

Russian name
- Russian: Ян Кёнджон
- Romanization: Yan Kyondzhon

Yang Kyoungjong (Korean: 양경종) is purported to have been a Korean man who, according to some historians, served in the Imperial Japanese Army, the Soviet Red Army, and finally the German Wehrmacht during World War II. While some men of apparent East Asian ethnicity served in the Wehrmacht and were captured by Allied forces, this individual's existence and supposed personal history are not substantiated by the historical record.

== Existence and identification ==
Authors Antony Beevor and Steven Zaloga have regarded Yang Kyoungjong's existence as a fact, but neither author provides any sources in their books. A 2005 Korean SBS documentary that focused on his case concluded there was no convincing evidence of his existence. Historical author Martin K. A. Morgan goes further and says that "Yang Kyoungjong is a person who never existed because he certainly never left us any proof that he ever existed."

After the invasion of Normandy on D-Day, a photo was taken of an unidentified man in Wehrmacht attire being processed as a prisoner of war. The official caption does not give his name, and instead refers to him as "young Japanese". The current description on the US National Archives refers to him as a "young Japanese man". In the 1994 book D-Day, June 6, 1944: The Climactic Battle of World War II, historian Stephen E. Ambrose wrote about an interview with an American officer, Robert B. Brewer, where Brewer recounted the capture of four Koreans in Wehrmacht uniforms. Ambrose wrote that "it seems they had been conscripted into the Japanese army in 1938—Korea was then a Japanese colony—captured by the Red Army in the border battles with Japan in 1939, forced into the Red Army, captured by the Wehrmacht in December 1941 outside Moscow, forced into the German army, and sent to France." He further notes that their further fate was not known, but speculated that they likely were returned to Korea and fought in the Korean War. The man with Asian features in the famous image is often linked to Yang Kyoungjong but the identity and ethnicity of the subject in the photo have never been verified and Brewer's account was not associated with the aforementioned photo.

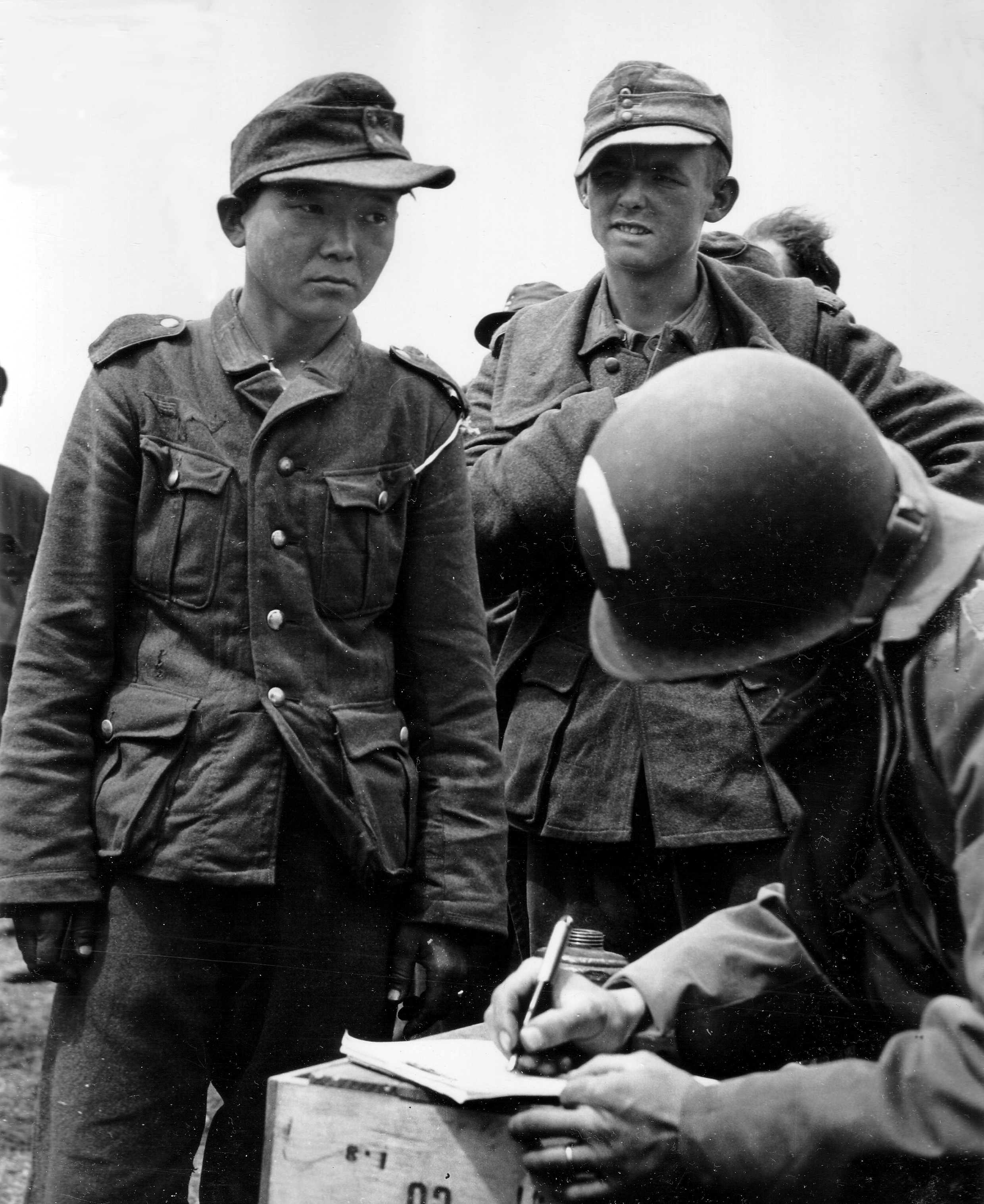
A photo of a German POW being processed after D-Day. Yang Kyoungjong is often identified as the POW, but no evidence has emerged to support this claim.

In 2002, Brewer's account was reported in Korean media. By 2004, the image was associated with Brewer's account and was circulating on the Internet. In the same year, Korean news site DKBNews reported on the image, said to be found on a "community website", and once again recounted the Brewer story. A reader of DKBNews submitted biographical details about the soldier in the image, including his name, date of birth, captures, release and death, along with his settlement in Illinois after the war. However, despite the journalist's request for sources, none was provided. The article also noted that it is impossible to determine if the person in the photo is Yang, since there were four Koreans described by Brewer. In December 2005, in response to the image that was widely circulating on the Internet, the Seoul Broadcasting System aired a documentary on the existence of the Asian soldiers who served Nazi Germany and were captured by Allied forces. The documentary concluded that although there had been Asian soldiers in the German Army during World War II, there was no clear evidence for the existence of Yang Kyoungjong.

The identity of the man continues to be a source of speculation. Author Martin Morgan believes the man is not Yang Kyoungjong, but instead an ethnic Georgian from the 795th Georgian Battalion, which was composed of Georgian Osttruppen troops.

== Purported biography ==
Author Steven Zaloga in his book The Devil's Garden: Rommel's Desperate Defense of Omaha Beach on D-Day provides an unsourced account that Kyoungjong was in Manchuria when he was conscripted into the Kwantung Army of the Imperial Japanese Army to fight against the Soviet Union. At the time, Korea was ruled by Japan. During the Battle of Khalkhin Gol, he was captured by the Soviet Red Army and sent to a Gulag labor camp. He was sent to the Eastern Front of Europe. In 1943, he was captured by Wehrmacht soldiers in eastern Ukraine during the Third Battle of Kharkov, and then joined the "Eastern Battalions" to fight for Germany.

The account of Yang's supposed capture was provided by author Antony Beevor: Yang was sent to Occupied France to serve in a battalion of former Soviet prisoners of war on the Cotentin Peninsula in Normandy, close to Utah Beach. After the D-Day landings in northern France by the Allied forces, Yang was captured by paratroopers of the United States Army in June 1944.

The Americans initially believed him to be a Japanese soldier in German uniform; at the time, Lieutenant Robert Brewer of the 506th Parachute Infantry Regiment, 101st Airborne Division, reported that his regiment had captured four Asians in German uniform after the Utah Beach landings, and that initially no one was able to communicate with them. According to Beevor and Zaloga, Yang was sent to a prison camp in Britain. Unlike other Osttruppen prisoners, Yang was not forcibly repatriated to the Soviet Union after the war. Instead, he was granted US citizenship, and supposedly died in Illinois in 1992.

== Legacy ==
The story of Yang was the basis for the 2011 South Korean film My Way. The movie follows two characters, a Korean boy named Jun-shik (played by Shin Sang-yeob) and his Japanese friend Tatsuo (played by Sung Yoo-bin). At the time it was billed as the "most expensive Korean film ever", with a budget of around $23 million.

In 2018, a city councillor in St. John's, Newfoundland, used the story of Yang as the basis for an online ad promoting her real estate business, which caused backlash.

== See also ==
- Chiang Wei-kuo
- Lauri Törni
- Joseph Beyrle
- Aleksandr Pavlovich Min
- Ivor Thord-Gray
- Apolônio de Carvalho
