= The Railroad (film) =

- Theatrical poster
- Hangul: 경의선
- Hanja: 京義線
- RR: Gyeonguiseon
- MR: Kyŏngŭisŏn
- Directed by: Park Heung-sik
- Written by: Park Heung-sik
- Produced by: Park Gok-ji; Park Mu-seung
- Starring: Kim Kang-woo; Son Tae-young
- Cinematography: Park Ki-woong
- Edited by: Park Gok-ji; Seo Yong-deok
- Music by: Yoon Min-hwa
- Production companies: Min Film Co. KM Culture
- Distributed by: Showbox
- Release dates: October 2006 (Pusan); May 10, 2007 (South Korea)
- Running time: 107 minutes
- Country: South Korea
- Language: Korean
- Box office: US$28,737

The Railroad (Korean: 경의선; RR: Gyeonguiseon) is a 2006 South Korean film starring Kim Kang-woo and Son Tae-young. The second feature film of writer and director Park Heung-sik, it was also co-produced and co-edited by his wife, Park Gok-ji. The Railroad won the FIPRESCI award and Best Actor for Kim Kang-woo at the 25th Torino Film Festival. The name is taken from the Gyeongui Line.

== Plot ==
Man-soo, a railroad engineer, experiences a traumatic accident, while Hanna, a German-language university lecturer who is having an affair with one of her colleagues, also suffers a personal tragedy. The two meet after boarding a train on the Gyeongui Line, and find themselves stranded in heavy snow at the last stop before the Korean Demilitarized Zone. With no other choice they are forced to spend the night together, and over time they begin to open up to each other and reveal their inner pains.

== Cast ==
- Kim Kang-woo as Man-soo
- Son Tae-young as Hanna
- Baek Jong-hak
- Cha Seo-won
- Ji Jong-eun
- Oh Jung-se
- Kim Dong-hwa
- Ahn Sun-young
- Kim Seung-wuk
- Jung In-gi
- Lee Ho-jae
- Park Jung-soo

== Production ==
Following a lukewarm reception to his debut feature, The Twins, director Park Heung-sik wrote the screenplay for The Railroad determined to make a film with a story he wanted to tell. His wife, Park Gok-ji, attached herself to the project as co-producer and co-editor, and used her influence within the local film industry to assist in the production. Director Park drew on his own experiences for the film; the character of Hanna was influenced by a woman he once saw in Taejongdae who looked suicidal, and he chose her profession as a German-language lecturer having studied German himself.

The Railroad was supported by the 2005 KOFIC Production Support for Low-budget Films program.

== Distribution and reception ==
The Railroad made its world premiere at the 11th Pusan International Film Festival in October 2006. The film competed in the New Current section and received a favourable reception from critics and audiences, with Paolo Bertolin of The Korea Times commenting that while director Park takes his time in delivering the film's subdued climax, he "nevertheless displays an assured command of visual composition and emotional punctuation". It later opened publicly on 10 May 2007 with a limited screening in just ten theatres, accumulating a total of 4,025 admissions and grossing US$28,737. Lead actor Kim Kang-woo was disappointed with the low level of distribution, and appeared at screenings by himself in an effort to promote the film.

In November 2007, The Railroad screened at the 25th Torino Film Festival in Italy, where it won the FIPRESCI award as well as Best Actor for Kim Kang-woo's performance. Although pleased to have won the award, Kim was more thrilled by the positive reaction from the Italian audience, noting that they responded to the film in much the same way as a Korean audience.
