= 25th Torino Film Festival =

The 25th Torino Film Festival was held 23 November – 1 December 2007 in Turin, Italy and was directed by Nanni Moretti.

== Films in competition ==
- The Art of Negative Thinking (Bård Breien)
- Away from Her (Sarah Polley)
- The Blue Hour (Eric Nazarian)
- The Elephant and the Sea (Woo Ming Jin)
- Free Fly (Janis Kalejs, Janis Putnins, Gatis Smits, Anna Viduleja)
- Garage (Leonard Abrahamson)
- The Home Song Stories (Tony Ayres)
- The Woven Stories of the Other (Sherad Anthony Sanchez)
- Lars and the Real Girl (Craig Gillespie)
- Lino (Jean-Louis Milesi)
- Neandertal (Ingo Haeb, Jan-Christoph Glaser)
- Noise (Matthew Saville)
- The Railroad (Park Heung-sik)
- The Savages (Tamara Jenkins)
- Water Lilies (Céline Sciamma)

== Awards ==
- Prize of the City of Torino:
  - Garage (Leonard Abrahamson)
- Jury Special Prize:
  - Film: The Elephant and the Sea (Woo Ming Jin)
  - Best Actress: Joan Chen (The Home Song Stories)
- Best Actor:
  - Kim Kang-woo (The Railroad)
- Best Female Performance:
  - Joan Chen (The Home Song Stories)
- Best Italian Short Film of the Year:
  - Giganti (Fabio Mollo)
- FIPRESCI Award:
  - The Railroad (Park Heung-sik)
