= Iljimae (1993 TV series) =

1993 South Korean television series

- Hangul: 일지매
- Hanja: 一枝梅
- RR: Iljimae
- MR: Ilchimae
- Genre: Historical
- Based on: Iljimae by Choi Jung-joo
- Screenplay by: Kim-Nam
- Directed by: Jo Joong-hyun
- Starring: Jang Dong-gun; Yum Jung-ah
- Country of origin: South Korea
- Original language: Korean
- No. of seasons: 1
- No. of episodes: 8

Production
- Running time: 60 minutes

Original release
- Network: MBC
- Release: August 9 – August 31, 1993

Iljimae (Korean: 일지매) is a 1993 South Korean mini series based on the novel with the same title by Choi Jung-joo starring Jang Dong-gun and Yum Jung-ah. It aired on MBC from August 9 to August 31, 1993, on Mondays and Tuesdays at 21:50 until 22:50 for 8 episodes.

== Cast ==
- Jang Dong-gun as Iljimae (일지매)
- Yum Jung-ah as Lee Hwa (이화)
- Im Kyung-wook as Jung Ran (정란)
  - Park Sun-young as Jung Ran (later replace by Im Kyung-wook)
- Kim Dong-hyun as Heo-Kyoon (허균)
- Park Soon-ae as Sul Hwa (설화)
- Jeon In-taek as a Grand Master (포도 대장)
- Shin Choong-shik as a Buddhist monk (법열 스님)
- Park Young-ji as Mae Yun (매연)

== Other ==
- Initially, Park Sun-young was cast as Jung Ran, but he was pushed out of the role as he cut his hair short for filming, and Im Kyung-wook replaced him. Because of this incident, Park was banned from appearing on MBC for six months due to the disruption to the production.
