= Taegukgi (film) =

2004 film by Kang Je-gyu

Taegukgi: The Brotherhood of War
- Theatrical release poster
- Hangul: 태극기 휘날리며
- Hanja: 太極旗 휘날리며
- RR: Taegeukgi hwinallimyeo
- MR: T'aegŭkki hwinallimyŏ
- Directed by: Kang Je-gyu
- Written by: Kang Je-gyu; Han Ji-hun; Kim Sang-don
- Produced by: Lee Seong-hun
- Starring: Jang Dong-gun; Won Bin; Lee Eun-ju
- Cinematography: Hong Kyung-pyo
- Edited by: Choi Kyeong-hie
- Music by: Lee Dong-june
- Production companies: Kang Je-gyu Films; KD Media
- Distributed by: Showbox
- Release date: February 6, 2004 (South Korea)
- Running time: 148 minutes
- Country: South Korea
- Language: Korean
- Budget: US$12.8 million
- Box office: US$76.3 million

Taegukgi: The Brotherhood of War (Korean: 태극기 휘날리며) is a 2004 South Korean war film directed by Kang Je-gyu. It stars Jang Dong-gun and Won Bin and tells the story of two brothers who are forcibly drafted into the South Korean army at the outbreak of the Korean War.

Kang Je-gyu made a name for himself directing Shiri and was able to attract top talent and capital to his new project, eventually spending 12.8 million USD on production. The film became one of the biggest successes in South Korean film history up to that time, attracting 11.74 million people to the theatre, beating the previous record holder Silmido.

== Plot ==
In 2003, (Note: The film was filmed and produced in 2003, and a character in the film mentions that it has been 50 years since the end of the Korean War, which ended in 1953.) while digging up remains at a Korean War battlefield to set up a memorial site, a South Korean army excavation team notifies an elderly man that they have identified some remains as his own even though he is still alive.

53 years earlier, in June 1950, the Lee family goes about their lives in the South Korean capital Seoul. Lee Jin-tae owns a shoeshine stand to pay for his younger brother Jin-seok's education. Jin-tae has also bought them a silver pen, a precious item the brothers share, and is working on a pair of immaculate shoes for his brother to wear to school. Jin-tae's fiancée, Young-shin, works with the Lees' noodle shop. On June 25, 1950, North Korea invades South Korea, and both brothers are forcibly conscripted. They are assigned to the 1st Infantry Division, fighting at the Pusan Perimeter before advancing north upon the successful U.S. amphibious landing at Inchon. Jin-tae is told by a superior that if he can earn the highest award for a South Korean soldier, the Taeguk Cordon of the Order of Military Merit, his brother can be sent home. Jin-tae volunteers for many dangerous missions and performs suicidal acts of bravery to earn the medal, and is quickly promoted to sergeant. His heroism during the urban Battle of Pyongyang finally results in Jin-tae's nomination for the medal, but his combat experiences have made him into a cold-blooded killer, which horrifies his younger brother.

The UN coalition is eventually forced to retreat all the way back to Seoul when the Chinese enter the war on the North Korean side. Jin-tae finally earns his medal, but in Seoul, Young-shin, suspected of joining the Communist Party during the Communist occupation, is arrested by a South Korean militia, and the brothers attempt to stop them. During the struggle, Young-shin is shot dead, and the brothers are arrested for trying to rescue her. In jail Jin-tae's request to release his brother is refused, and the security commander orders the prison set afire with the prisoners inside when the enemy forces approach. Trying to rescue his brother, Jin-tae loses consciousness and wakes up believing Jin-seok died in the fire. He murders the surrendering prison warden before being captured by Chinese soldiers.

In truth, however, Jin-seok had been transferred to a military hospital after barely escaping, rescued by "Uncle Yang", a now-disabled veteran from their old unit. Jin-seok learns that his brother had defected to the North Koreans and now leads an elite North Korean formation known as the "Flag Unit".

Jin-seok chooses to rejoin the Army, which has by now retaken all of what is today South Korea with UN support. He demands to be allowed to fight, at the 38th parallel, but is denied. Jin-seok eventually defects, claiming to his captors he is Jin-tae's brother. The North Koreans, however, believe Jin-seok is a spy and are about to take him away for interrogation when their position is attacked by U.S. and South Korean forces. The attack frees Jin-seok, who continues his search as the position is captured in a vicious hand-to-hand battle. Before the U.S. and South Korean forces can secure their gains, however, the "Flag Unit" arrives, tearing into them with Jin-tae at its head.

The brothers come face-to-face, but, not recognizing Jin-seok, Jin-tae attempts to kill him, and Jin-seok barely avoids death before his brother is briefly incapacitated. Jin-seok attempts to carry him away but is shot in the leg. With both of them wounded, Jin-tae finally recognizes his younger brother, and the two have a tearful reunion. This is cut short, however, as the North Koreans force back the U.S. and South Korean troops. Jin-Tae orders his brother to save himself. Jin-seok initially refuses but relents after Jin-Tae promises that they will meet again. As the wounded Jin-seok limps to safety, Jin-tae mans a machine gun and provides cover fire for his younger brother and the other South Koreans before being killed.

In 2003, the elderly Jin-seok stands at the excavation site; the remains initially identified as his are those of Jin-tae. He examines Jin-tae's few excavated belongings, including their long-lost silver pen, and begs his brother's skeletal remains to speak to him, quoting his promises as his granddaughter looks on with sympathy.

Back in the 1950s, in the aftermath of the Korean War, Jin-seok returns to his mother, who also survived, discovers the shoes to which his brother had dedicated himself to perfecting, and heads off with Young-shin's younger siblings in a now-peaceful, but ruined, Seoul as the nation begins rebuilding. He reassures them that he will return to school, fulfilling the promise he made to Jin-tae.

== Cast ==
- Jang Dong-gun as Lee Jin-tae
- Won Bin as Lee Jin-seok, Jin-tae's younger brother
  - Jang Min-ho as old Lee Jin-seok
- Lee Eun-ju as Kim Young-shin, Jin-tae's fiancée
- Choi Min-sik as North Korean commander
- Gong Hyung-jin as Yong-man
- Ahn Gil-kang as Sergeant Heo
- Jeon Jae-hyeong as Yong-seok
- Jo Yoon-hee as Lee Jin-seok's granddaughter
- Kim Soo-ro as Anti-Communist Federation member
- Joo Da-young as Young-ja
- Kim Jae-joong as Corpse hazardous excavation site unit

Prior to Kim Jae-joong's debut as a singer, he worked as extra, one is a Corpse hazardous excavation site unit and the other is a Chinese soldier (uncredited).

Jo Sung-mo also worked as an extra, playing a soldier of the North Korean People's Army (uncredited).

== Production ==
=== Title ===
The film's title is the name of the pre-war flag of the People's Republic of Korea, the flag of the Provisional People's Committee for North Korea as well as the current flag of South Korea, featuring the Taegeuk symbol. It was released in the United Kingdom as Brotherhood: Taegukgi and the United States as Tae Guk Gi: The Brotherhood of War.

=== Soundtrack ===
Prologue (main theme)

The music was composed by Lee Dong-june, and released on February 23, 2004 as a single CD, produced by Yejeon Media in South Korea and Avex Trax in Japan. It has 25 tracks, with seven bonus tracks, including a solo piano and chamber ensemble arrangement of the main theme. The "haunting" main theme's lyricism, present throughout several of the tracks, was compared favorably to music of film score composers Ennio Morricone and John Williams. Although it was received generally positively, one critic argued that the film was tragic enough already, and needed "a more subtle soundtrack."

== Reception ==
At the 50th Asia Pacific Film Festival, Taegukgi won Best Film while Kang Je-gyu earned Best Director. It was one of four Korean movies screened at the 2006 International Fajr Film Festival in Iran. At the 2004 Grand Bell Awards, the main awards for film in South Korea, Taegukgi won three technical awards, for art direction, cinematography and sound effects.

According to the numbers at Box Office Mojo, Taegukgi earned ₩64.8 billion in South Korea, $1.1 million in the United States playing in limited release and $68.7 million overall worldwide, to finish as the 75th highest-grossing film in the world in 2004.

In addition to its record-breaking reception in South Korea, the film has also achieved positive responses abroad. Taegukgi holds a fresh rating of 80% at Rotten Tomatoes. Most positive reviews cite its unflinching portrayal of war and praise it for showing the brutality of both the North and South Korean armies. The film is also recommended by the War Nerd Gary Brecher.

=== Awards and nominations ===
Year	Award	Category	Recipient	Result
2004	Baeksang Arts Awards	Best Film	Taegukgi	Won
2004	Grand Bell Awards	Best Director	Kang Je-gyu	Nominated
2004	Grand Bell Awards	Best Actor	Jang Dong-gun	Nominated
2004	Grand Bell Awards	Best Planning	Kang Je-gyu	Nominated
2004	Grand Bell Awards	Best Cinematography	Hong Kyung-pyo	Won
2004	Grand Bell Awards	Best Editing	Park Gok-ji	Nominated
2004	Grand Bell Awards	Best Art Direction	Shin Bo-kyeong, Kang Chang-gil, Kang Bo-kil	Won
2004	Grand Bell Awards	Best Costume Design	Lee Ja-young, Kim Jung-won	Nominated
2004	Grand Bell Awards	Best Visual Effects	Kang Jong-ik, Shin Jae-ho, Jeong Do-an	Nominated
2004	Grand Bell Awards	Best Sound Effects	Lee Tae-gyu, Kim Suk-won	Won
2004	Blue Dragon Film Awards	Best Film	Taegukgi	Nominated
2004	Blue Dragon Film Awards	Best Director	Kang Je-gyu	Nominated
2004	Blue Dragon Film Awards	Best Actor	Jang Dong-gun	Won
2004	Blue Dragon Film Awards	Best Supporting Actor	Gong Hyung-jin	Nominated
2004	Blue Dragon Film Awards	Best Screenplay	Kang Je-gyu, Han Ji-hun, Kim Sang-don	Nominated
2004	Blue Dragon Film Awards	Best Cinematography	Hong Kyung-pyo	Won
2004	Blue Dragon Film Awards	Best Art Direction	Shin Bo-kyeong, Kang Chang-gil, Kang Bo-kil	Nominated
2004	Blue Dragon Film Awards	Best Visual Effects	Kang Jong-ik, Shin Jae-ho, Jeong Do-an	Won
2004	Blue Dragon Film Awards	Best Music	Lee Dong-jun	Nominated
2005	Asia Pacific Film Festival	Best Film	Taegukgi	Won
2005	Asia Pacific Film Festival	Best Director	Kang Je-gyu	Won

== See also ==
- List of historical drama films of Asia
- Goyang Geumjeong Cave massacre
- Namyangju Massacre
