= Park Heung-sik (born 1962) =

South Korean film director and screenwriter

- Born: 1962 (age 63–64)
- Occupations: Film director, screenwriter
- Years active: 1992–present
- Spouse: Park Gok-ji

Korean name
- Hangul: 박흥식
- RR: Bak Heungsik
- MR: Pak Hŭngsik

Park Heung-sik (born 1962) is a South Korean film director and screenwriter.

Park studied at the Free University of Berlin, where he received a master's degree in filmology. Having garnered favourable comments for his short films at various film festivals, he made the transition to features with his 2005 debut The Twins, though it only received a lukewarm response from critics and audiences. For his second feature, The Railroad, Park drew on his own experiences and set out to create a film with a story that he wanted to tell. The Railroad was co-produced and co-directed by his wife, film editor Park Gok-ji, and premiered at the 11th Pusan International Film Festival in October 2006. Paolo Bertolin of The Korea Times commented that while Park took his time in delivering the film's subdued climax, he "nevertheless displays an assured command of visual composition and emotional punctuation". Following a limited release in Korean cinemas in May 2007, The Railroad screened at the 25th Torino Film Festival where it won the FIPRESCI award as well as Best Actor for the performance of Kim Kang-woo.

== Filmography ==
- The Twins (2005)
- The Railroad (2007)
- Twenty Again (2015)
- a day (2017)
- A Birth (2022)
