= Malli-dong =

Neighbourhood in Seoul, South Korea

Coordinates: 34°36′N 126°36′E

- Interactive map of Malli-dong
- Country: South Korea

Area
  - Total: 0.21 km^{2} (0.081 sq mi)

Korean name
- Hangul: 만리동
- Hanja: 萬里洞
- RR: Malli-dong
- MR: Malli-dong

Malli-dong (Korean: 만리동) is a legal dong (neighbourhood) of Jung District, Seoul, South Korea. It is governed by its administrative dong, Jungnim-dong. Its name means "10,000 li village".

== See also ==
- Administrative divisions of South Korea
