= The Legend of Gingko =

- Hangul: 단적비연수
- RR: Danjeokbiyeonsu
- MR: Tanjŏkpiyŏnsu
- Directed by: Park Jae-hyun
- Written by: Kim Seon-mi; Park Jae-hyun
- Produced by: Kang Je-gyu
- Starring: Kim Suk-hoon; Sul Kyung-gu; Choi Jin-sil; Yunjin Kim; Lee Mi-sook
- Cinematography: Kim Yeong-cheol
- Edited by: Park Gok-ji
- Music by: Hwang Sang-jun
- Production company: Kang Je-gyu Film
- Distributed by: Kang Je-gyu Film
- Release date: November 11, 2000 (South Korea)
- Running time: 118 minutes
- Country: South Korea
- Language: Korean

The Legend of Gingko (Korean: 단적비연수; RR: Danjeokbiyeonsu) is a 2000 South Korean romantic fantasy adventure film directed by Park Jae-hyun, and starring Kim Suk-hoon, Sul Kyung-gu, Choi Jin-sil, Yunjin Kim, and Lee Mi-sook. The film was released on November 11, 2000.

== Plot ==
A tale of boundless love that even accepts parting: Dan, love absolute and solemn. Jeok, love tragic and unattainable. Bi, love sorrowful and unfulfilled. Yeon, love that can never be possessed. Su, incarnation of ambition that abandons even love.

Beneath the sacred mountain Shinsan (神山), where spirits governing heaven and earth dwelled, lived the Falcon Tribe and the Volcano Tribe. The Falcon Tribe's desire to rule the world led to war with the Volcano Tribe, and ultimately, they were cursed by Shinsan. Stripped of everything, they were driven into barren lands, where they longed for the day they could rebuild their tribe.

Centuries later, Su, the female chieftain of the Falcon Tribe, conceived Bi with a man from the Volcano Tribe, seeking to fulfill her ambition of eternal life for her people and domination of the world. The only way for the Falcon Tribe to be reborn was to sacrifice Bi and sever Shinsan's lifeline.

Upon learning the truth, Dan rescues Bi, who had been offered as a living sacrifice at the Falcon Tribe's altar, from the brink of death. Taking Bi, who holds the secret of Shinsan, Han returns to his native Volcano Village, the place he once left behind after breaking tribal law for love.

In Volcano Village, Bi grows into adulthood, sharing deep friendship with Dan, Jeok, and Yeon. Dan and Jeok face off in a duel to determine the strongest warrior of the Volcano Tribe. By rule, the victorious Jeok is chosen as successor and is set to marry Yeon, of royal lineage. Meanwhile, unaware of Bi's tragic fate, that she exists only to be sacrificed, Dan falls in love with her.

One day, an earthquake strikes the village, and ominous energy spreads, plunging the community into chaos. Realizing that Shinsan is calling for her, Bi comes to understand her destiny. To prevent disaster from befalling the tribe, she resolves to sacrifice her own life and sets out for Shinsan. At the same time, the Falcon Tribe marches toward Volcano Village with a massive army, determined to claim Bi.

== Cast ==
- Kim Suk-hoon as Dan
- Sul Kyung-gu as Jeok
- Choi Jin-sil as Bi
  - Jeong Da-bin as young Bi
- Yunjin Kim as Yeon
- Lee Mi-sook as Su

== Marketing ==
The Korean film poster reads 은행나무 침대2: 단적비연수 (The Gingko Bed 2: The Legend of Gingko) and the story mirrors the backstory of General Hwang and Mi-dan told in the film The Gingko Bed. Kang Je-gyu, the director of The Gingko Bed, served as the producer of this prequel.
