= Kang Je-gyu =

South Korean film director (born 1962)

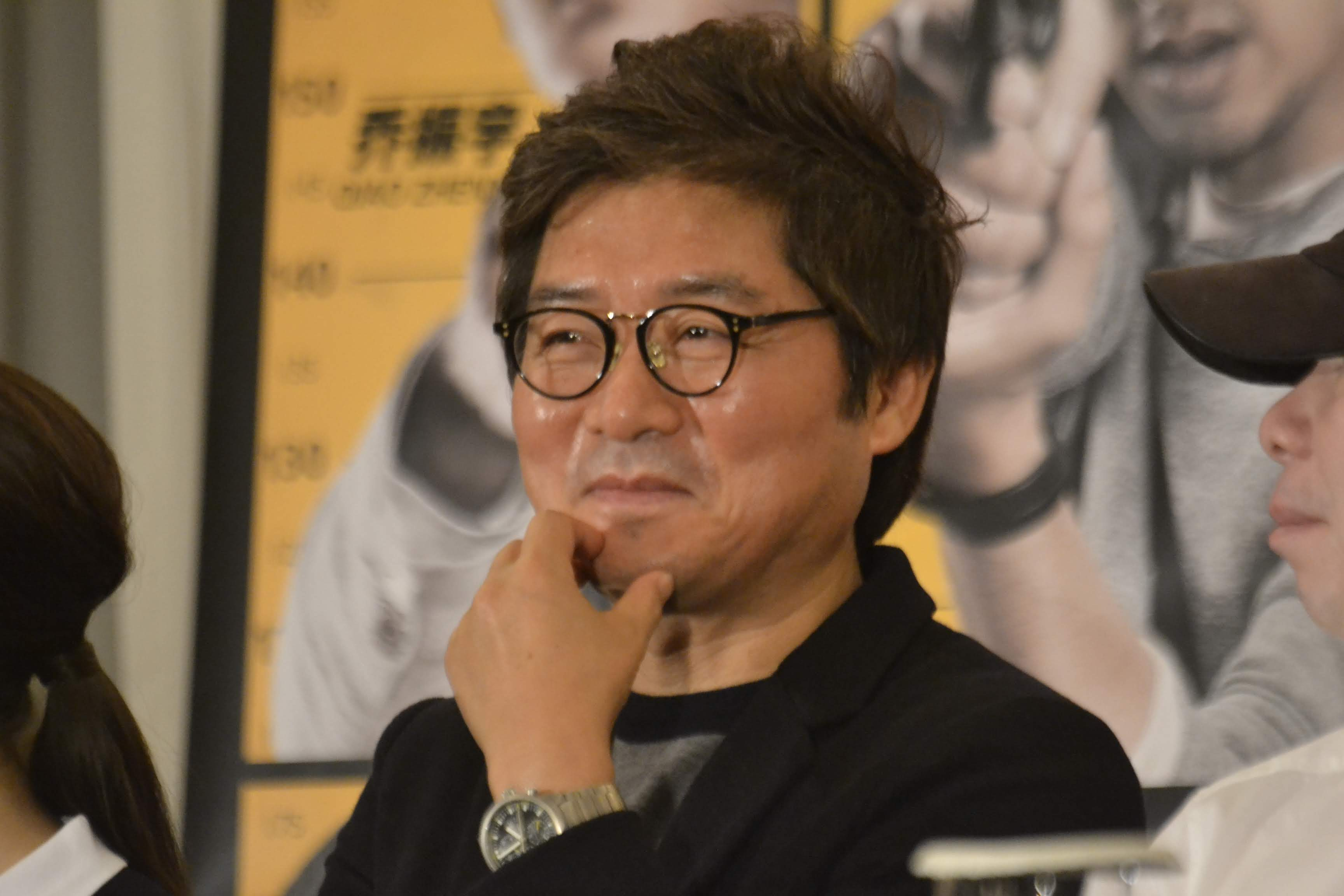
- Kang in 2015
- Born: December 23, 1962 (age 63); South Korea
- Occupation: Film director

Korean name
- Hangul: 강제규
- Hanja: 姜帝圭
- RR: Gang Jegyu
- MR: Kang Chegyu

Kang Je-gyu (born December 23, 1962) is a South Korean filmmaker, active as a director, scriptwriter, and producer. He rose to international prominence with his action thriller Shiri (1999) and further solidified his reputation with the critically acclaimed war epic Taegukgi: The Brotherhood of War (2004), both of which achieved box office success.

== Early life and education ==
Kang was born on December 23, 1962, in Masan, Gyeongnam, as the youngest of two sons and two daughters. His parents ran a foundry and hardware store in the downtown Burim Market, earning him the nickname "son of a pot shop." Kang Je-gyu graduated from Hoewon Elementary School in 1975, Masan Middle School in 1978, He was an excellent student, often taking first place in his classes. He was good at drawing, liked math among his subjects. During middle school, Kang was an exemplary student, achieving top academic rankings. He later attended Masan High School, a prestigious institution, with aspirations of enrolling at Seoul National University.

Despite his initial academic focus, Kang developed an interest in literature during adolescence. He joined the literary circle Deokseom, where he engaged with works like Antoine de Saint-Exupéry's The Little Prince and Richard Bach's Jonathan Livingston Seagull, and practiced poetry. Simultaneously, he cultivated a passion for photography, using a Nikon film camera gifted by his father to capture landscapes. This interest evolved into a fascination with videography and eventually cinema. Kang's decision to pursue filmmaking was solidified after watching David Lean's 1965 epic drama Doctor Zhivago at the now-defunct Shinil Theater in Masan during his transition from his first to second year of high school. This experience inspired him to explore film-related literature and aspire to a career in filmmaking. He later enrolled in the Department of Film at Chung-Ang University, graduating in 1985 with a bachelor's degree in film.

== Career ==
After graduating from the Department of Theater and Film at Chung-Ang University, Kang Je-gyu entered Chungmuro in 1984 as a trainee, having passed the open recruitment exam for screenwriters at Hapdong Film Company. He began his career as an assistant director, working on several productions, starting with Cemetery of Beauties. His screenplay debut was "Who Saw the Dragon's Claws?" (1992). After that, he wrote scenarios for "Days of the Rose" and "Rules of the Game".

In 1993, he established his own company, Movie Power Plant. Kang's name became widely known in 1995 when The Gingko Bed, which he planned and directed, became a major hit, attracting over 1.5 million viewers. The Gingko Bed ranked second in box office sales among Korean films released in 1996, and he won the Best New Director Award at the 96th Grand Bell Awards and the Blue Dragon Film Awards.

In 1998, Kang renamed Movie Power Plant to Kang Je-gyu Film. Shiri was the first big-budget, Hollywood-style action film made in Korea. It broke box office records and was partially responsible for popularizing domestic films in the country. In 1999, Shiri set a nationwide box office record with 5.97 million viewers.

In February 2000, Kang Je-gyu Film formed a strategic alliance with Korea Technology Finance Corporation (KTB), the largest venture capital firm in Korea. This partnership, with KTB investing 5.75 billion won for a 20% stake in Kang Je-gyu Film, became a catalyst for the reorganization of the Korean film industry. In 2001, Kang Je-gyu stepped down as CEO of Kang Je-gyu Film to concentrate on writing and directing his upcoming films. The company subsequently appointed Choi Jin-hwa, former Senior Vice President of Samsung Visual Communications and CEO of AP Electronics, as the new CEO.

For his next film, Taegukgi, Kang collaborated with cinematographer Hong Kyung-pyo and martial arts director Jung Du-hong. The film reportedly had a production budget of 14.8 billion won, the largest budget in Korean cinema history at that time. Taegukgi, released five years after Shiri, again rewrote box office records, attracting over ten million viewers in South Korea alone. The New York Times introduced director Kang Je-gyu as the "Steven Spielberg of East Asia" and Taegukgi as "Korea's Saving Private Ryan." Kang's most notable contributions to Korean cinema had been Shiri and Taegukgi.

In 2004, he merged Kang Je-gyu Film with Myung Films, forming MK Pictures. Also in 2004, Kang signed with Creative Artists Agency (CAA).

In an interview for the BBC special Asian Invasion, Kang revealed that he wanted his next project to be a science fiction film. He said, "I have produced two movies about Korea. So now I'm preparing a new movie that is related to something more global--a problem that the whole world is facing right now."

After a 7-year hiatus, in 2011 Kang unveiled his film My Way, set during World War II with a star-studded pan-Asian cast and the highest budget for a Korean film at the time.

== Personal life ==
Kang married actress Park Sung-mi in 1989 after dating for eight years. They met as classmate in the Department of Film at Chung-Ang University. They have two sons.

== Filmography ==
=== Film ===
| Year | Title | Credited as | | | Notes | Ref |
| Year | Title | Director | Writer | Producer | Notes | Ref |
|---|---|---|---|---|---|---|
| 1983 | Underground sky space | Yes | Yes | Yes | Short film | |
| 1990 | Well, Let's Look at the Sky Sometimes | No | Yes | No | | |
| 1991 | Who Saw the Dragon's Claw | No | Yes | No | | |
| 1994 | Rules of the Game | No | Yes | No | | |
| 1994 | Days of Roses | No | Yes | No | | |
| 1996 | The Gingko Bed | Yes | Yes | No | | |
| 1997 | Lament | No | Yes | No | | |
| 1999 | Shiri | Yes | Yes | No | | |
| 2000 | The Legend of Gingko | No | No | Yes | | |
| 2001 | Kiss Me Much | No | No | Yes | | |
| 2004 | Taegukgi | Yes | Yes | No | | |
| 2011 | My Way | Yes | Yes | Yes | | |
| 2014 | Awaiting | Yes | Yes | No | Short film | |
| 2015 | Salut d'Amour | Yes | Yes | No | | |
| 2015 | Bad Guys Always Die | No | No | Yes | | |
| 2023 | Road to Boston | Yes | No | Yes | | |

== Awards and nominations ==
| Year | Award | Category | Recipient | Result | Ref. |
|---|---|---|---|---|---|
| 1991 | Korean Scenario Awards | Grand Prize | Who Saw the Dragon's Claw | Won | |
| 1991 | Baeksang Arts Awards | Best Screenplay | Who Saw the Dragon's Claw | Won | |
| 1994 | Chunsa Film Art Awards | Best Screenplay | Rules of the Game | Won | |
| 1996 | Blue Dragon Film Awards | Best New Director | The Gingko Bed | Won | |
| 1996 | Grand Bell Awards | Best New Director | The Gingko Bed | Won | |
| 1996 | Korean Women's Cultural Association | 96 Best Work Award | The Gingko Bed | Won | |
| 1997 | Cine21 Film Awards | Best Picture Award | The Gingko Bed | Won | |
| 1997 | Cine21 Film Awards | New Director of the Year Award | The Gingko Bed | Won | |
| 1999 | Baeksang Arts Awards | Grand Prize | Kang Je-gyu, Shiri | Won | |
| 1999 | Baeksang Arts Awards | Best Film | Shiri | Won | |
| 1999 | Baeksang Arts Awards | Best Director | Shiri | Won | |
| 1999 | 36th Grand Bell Awards | Planning Award | Shiri | Won | |
| 1999 | 19th Korean Film Critics Association Awards | Special Award | Shiri | Won | |
| 1999 | 19th Korean Film Critics Association Awards | Planning Award | Shiri | Won | |
| 1999 | 19th Korean Film Critics Association Awards | Screenplay Award | Shiri | Won | |
| 1999 | 44th Asia Pacific Film Festival | Jury Special Award | Shiri | Won | |
| 1999 | 44th Asia Pacific Film Festival | Best Editing Award | Shiri | Won | |
| 1999 | 20th Blue Dragon Film Awards | Most Viewed Korean Film Award | Shiri | Won | |
| 1999 | 20th Blue Dragon Film Awards | Best Director | Shiri | Won | |
| 1999 | 2nd Director's Cut Awards | Filmmaker of the Year Award | Shiri | Won | |
| 1999 | 7th Korea Popular Entertainment Awards | Best Picture — Film | Shiri | Won | |
| 1999 | 7th Korea Popular Entertainment Awards | Best Director | Shiri | Won | |
| 2001 | 24th Golden Cinematography Awards | Production Achievement Award | Shiri | Won | |
| 2004 | Baeksang Arts Awards | Best Film | Taegukgi | Won | |
| 2004 | Grand Bell Awards | Best Director | Taegukgi | Nominated | |
| 2004 | Grand Bell Awards | Best Planning | Taegukgi | Nominated | |
| 2004 | Blue Dragon Film Awards | Best Film | Taegukgi | Nominated | |
| 2004 | Blue Dragon Film Awards | Best Director | Taegukgi | Nominated | |
| 2004 | Blue Dragon Film Awards | Best Screenplay (Note: with Han Ji-hun, Kim Sang-don) | Taegukgi | Nominated | |
| 2005 | Asia Pacific Film Festival | Best Film | Taegukgi | Won | |
| 2005 | Asia Pacific Film Festival | Best Director | Taegukgi | Won | |
| 2005 | 2nd Max Movie Best Movie Awards | Best Picture | Taegukgi | Won | |
| 2005 | 2nd Max Movie Best Movie Awards | Best Director | Taegukgi | Won | |
| 2007 | 7th Korea Youth Film Festival | Director Award | Taegukgi | Won | |
| 2007 | Art and Culture Award | Grand Prize | Taegukgi | Won | |
| 2012 | Dallas International Film Festival | Audience Award | My Way | Won | |
| 2013 | Saturn Awards | Best International Film | My Way | Nominated | |
| 2015 | Golden Goblet Award | Best Film | Salut d'Amour | Nominated | |

== See also ==
- List of Korean film directors
- Cinema of Korea
- Contemporary culture of South Korea
