= Sohn Kee-chung =

Korean marathon runner (1912–2002)

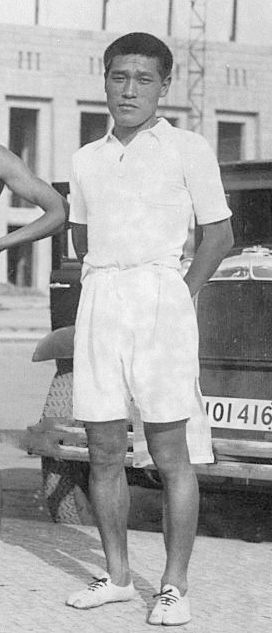
- Sohn in 1936

Personal information
- Native name: 손기정
- Born: August 29, 1912 Shingishu, Heianhoku-dō, Korea, Empire of Japan
- Died: November 15, 2002 (aged 90) Seoul, South Korea
- Resting place: Daejeon National Cemetery
- Height: 1.70 m (5 ft 7 in)
- Weight: 60 kg (132 lb)

Korean name
- Hangul: 손기정
- Hanja: 孫基禎
- RR: Son Gijeong
- MR: Son Kijŏng

Sport
- Sport: Athletics

Achievements and titles
- Olympic finals: 1936 Summer Olympics: Men's marathon; Gold
Medal record
Representing Japan
Olympic Games
Gold medal – first place	1936 Berlin	Marathon

Sohn Kee-chung (Korean: 손기정; Korean pronunciation: [son.kidʑʌŋ]; August 29, 1912 – November 15, 2002) was a Korean Olympic athlete and long-distance runner. He became the first Korean to win a medal at the Olympic Games, winning gold in the marathon at the 1936 Berlin Olympics. He was born in the Korean Peninsula, but he was forced to compete as a member of the Japanese delegation because Korea was under Japanese rule at the time. Sohn set an Olympic record of 2 hours 29 minutes 19.2 seconds.

Sohn competed under the Japanese name Kitei Son, as Korea was under Japanese occupation during his career.

== Early life ==
Sohn Kee-chung was born on August 29, 1912, in Sinuiju (then "Shingishū"), Heianhoku-dō, Korea, Empire of Japan (now in North Korea). He was born into the Miryang Son clan.

Sohn reportedly had a talent for running even at a young age. In sixth grade, he placed first in a regional 5 km race, beating out older competitors. He studied at Yangchung High School in Seoul, which was reputed for its track and field program. He then enrolled in and graduated from Meiji University in Tokyo.

== Athletics career ==
In 1931, he ran as the representative of his province at the Chōsen Shrine Competition (조선신궁대회) in Seoul (Keijō), and placed first. In 1932, he came in second in the Kyŏngyŏng Race (경영 마라톤대회), which was hosted by newspaper The Dong-A Ilbo. In April 1932, he won the Tokyo-Yokohama ekiden (road race).

Sohn first competed in the 1,500 and 5,000 m, but turned to longer distances after winning the Chōsen Shrine Competition in October 1933. Between 1933 and 1936, he ran 12 marathons; he finished in the top three on all occasions and won nine. On November 3, 1935, in Tokyo, Japan, Sohn set a world record in the marathon with a time of 2:26:42, which broke the world record 2:26:44 set by Yasuo Ikenaka of Japan at the Berlin Olympic trials on April 3, 1935, in Tokyo. According to the International Association of Athletics Federations, the record remained unbroken until Sohn's own trainee, Suh Yun-Bok, won the 1947 Boston Marathon. Unofficially, he ran a marathon with a time under 2:24 on April 27, 1935, in Seoul.

== 1936 Berlin Olympics ==
Sohn, competing for the Empire of Japan, won the gold medal at the 1936 Summer Olympics in the marathon. He ran the 42.195 kilometres (26.219 mi) course in 2:29:19.2, breaking the Olympic record. His teammate Nam Sung-yong took the bronze medal. As Korea was under Japanese rule at the time, the International Olympic Committee (IOC) officially credited Japan with Sohn's gold and Nam's bronze in the 1936 Summer Olympics medal count.

On December 9, 2011, the IOC recognized Sohn's Korean nationality in his official profile. It cited his efforts to sign his Korean name and his stress on Korea's status as a separate nation during interviews. The move was part of the Korean Olympic Committee's repeated requests to acknowledge Sohn's background. However, the IOC ruled out changing the nationality and registered name per official records to prevent historical distortions.

=== Political significance ===
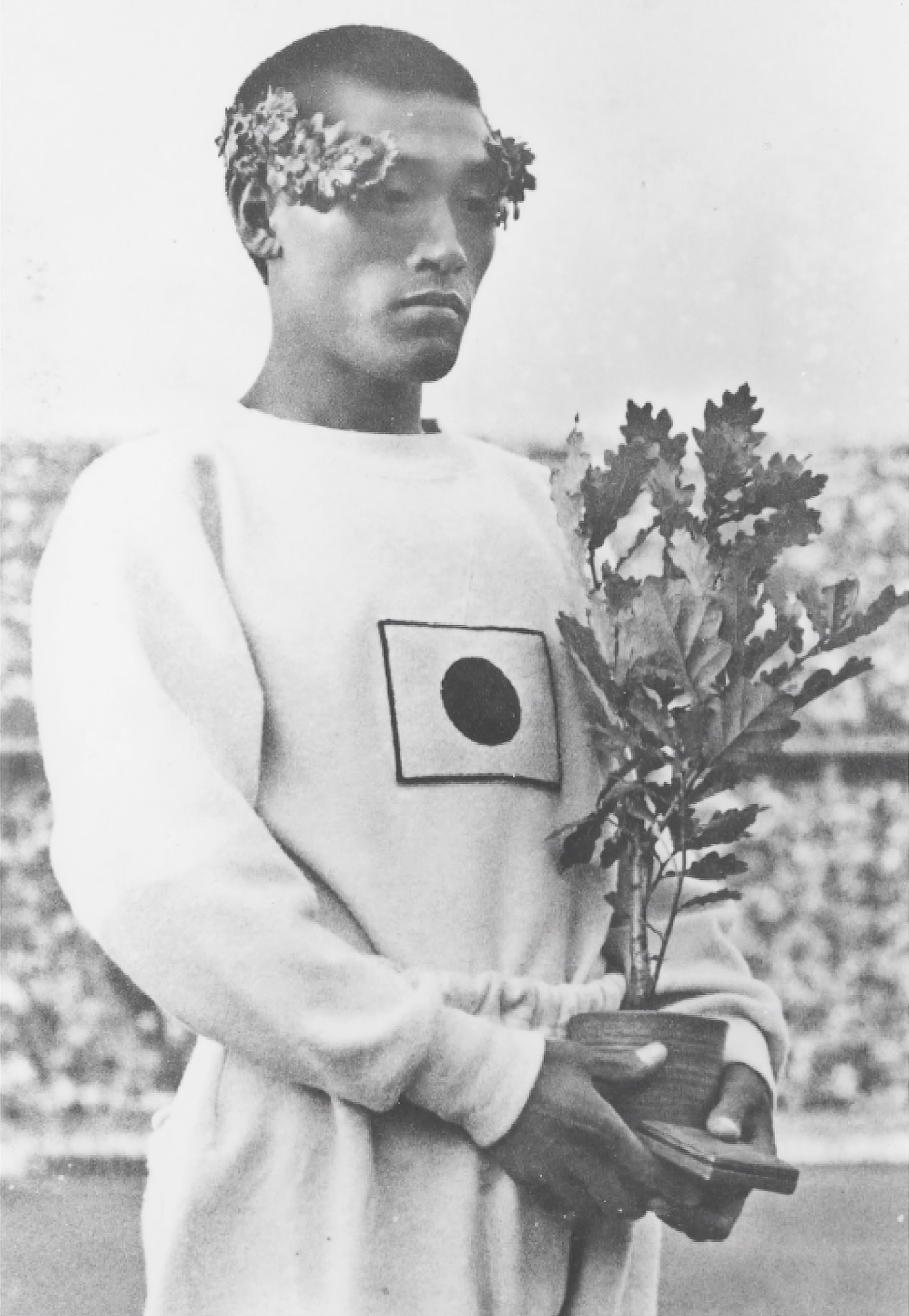
Sohn upon winning the gold in the 1936 Olympics

Under orders from Tokyo, Sohn Kee-chung had to compete using the Latin alphabet name of Son Kitei. It is the romanization of the Japanese pronunciation of his Korean name in hanja.

Sohn refused to acknowledge the Japanese anthem while it was played at his award ceremony and later told reporters that he was ashamed to run for Japan. When the Dong-a Ilbo published a photograph of Sohn at the medal ceremony, it altered the image to remove the Japanese flag from his running tunic. The act enraged the Japanese Governor-General of Korea Minami Jiro in Seoul. The Kempetai military police imprisoned eight people connected with the newspaper and suspended its publication for nine months.

=== Hellenic prize ===
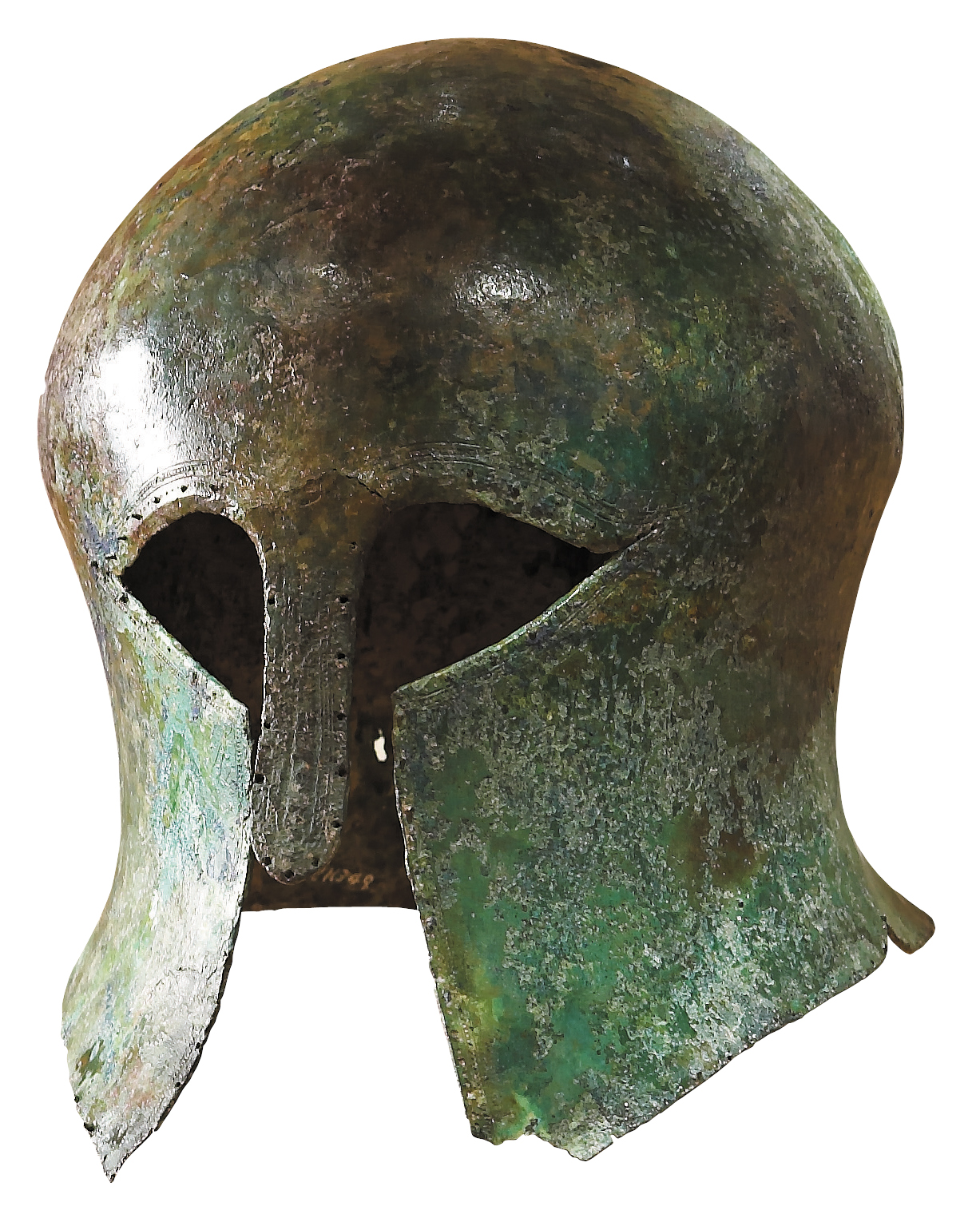
The Corinthian helmet that was awarded to Sohn Kee-chung, now on display at the National Museum of Korea

For winning the marathon, Sohn was to have received an ancient Corinthian helmet from the 8th century BC, which was discovered at Olympia, Greece, and later purchased by a newspaper in Athens to give as an Olympic award. However, the IOC believed that presenting such a valuable gift to a runner would violate its amateur rules. The helmet was placed in a Berlin museum and remained there for 50 years. It was finally presented to Sohn in 1986. Sohn donated the helmet to the National Museum of Korea, which designated it as the 904th and only Western Treasure. There was initially a plan to award replicas of this helmet to the winners of the 2006 Sohn Kee-chung marathon, but they eventually got only a chance to wear a replica.

== Later life ==
Sohn was the team manager for the Korea at the 1948 and 1952 Summer Olympics and was the nation's flag bearer in the London 1948 opening ceremony. Sohn spent the remainder of his career in South Korea coaching other notable runners such as Suh Yun-Bok, the winner of the Boston Marathon in 1947; Ham Kee-Yong, winner of the Boston Marathon in 1950; and Hwang Young-Cho, who was the gold medalist of the 1992 Summer Olympics marathon, and whom Sohn Kee-chung especially went to Barcelona to see. Sohn also became the Vice Chairman of the Korean Sport & Olympic Committee. At the 1988 Summer Olympics in Seoul, he was given the honor of carrying the Olympic torch in the stadium during the opening ceremony.

Sohn authored an autobiography entitled My Motherland, My Marathon (나의 조국 나의 마라톤). He was honored with the Moran Class of the Korean Order of Civil Merit.

== Death and legacy ==
Sohn died at midnight on November 15, 2002, at age 90 from pneumonia. He was buried at the Daejeon National Cemetery. The Sohn Kee-chung Park in Seoul was established in his honor. He was also posthumously made a Grand Cordon (Blue Dragon) of the Order of Sports Merit.

Records
Preceded by (Japan) Yasuo Ikenaka	Men's Marathon World Record Holder; November 3, 1935 – April 19, 1947	Succeeded by (South Korea) Suh Yun-Bok
Olympic Games
Preceded by Rafer Johnson	Final Summer Olympic Torchbearer; 1988 Seoul; With: Chung Sun-Man & Kim Won-tak	Succeeded by Antonio Rebollo
