= Lee Dong-june =

Music composer

- 이동준
- Born: February 5, 1967 (age 59)

Lee Dong-june (Hangul: 이동준, born 5 February 1967) is a music composer from South Korea.

== Career ==
Lee's career as a composer mostly focused on film score.

Lee composed AFC Anthem in 2014

== Filmography ==
=== Film ===
- 1996 The Gingko Bed - music composer
- 1997 Green Fish - music composer
- 2002 2009: Lost Memories - music composer
- 2003 Save the Green Planet! - music composer
- 2004 Taegukgi: The Brotherhood of War - music composer
- 2013 Miracle in Cell No. 7 - music composer
- 2023 Road to Boston - music composer

== Awards ==
- Grand Bell Awards in Best Music for Green Fish (and nominated for 5 other times)
- Blue Dragon Film Awards - Nominated for Best Music for Taegukgi: The Brotherhood of War
