= Suh Yun-bok =

Korean marathoner (1923–2017)

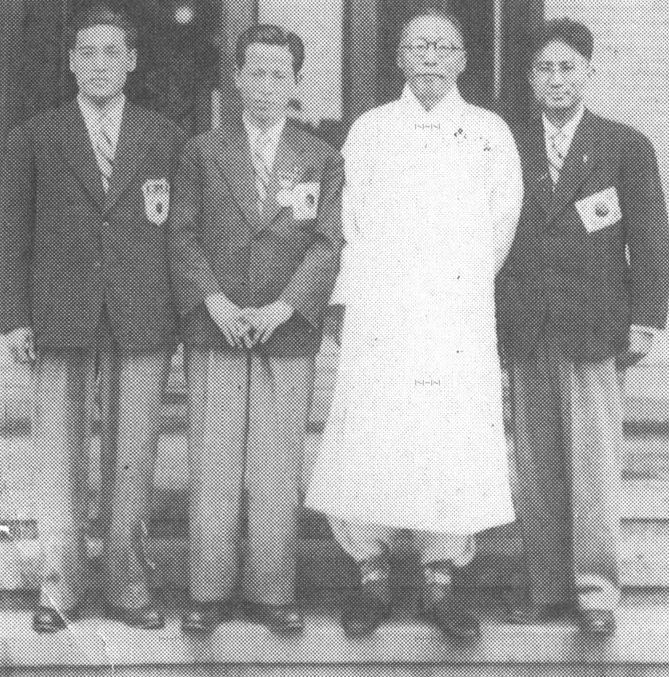
- Sohn Kee-chung, Suh Yun-bok, Kim Ku and Nam Sung-yong at Gyeonggyojang in 1947
- Born: January 9, 1923; Korea, Empire of Japan,
- Died: June 27, 2017 (aged 94)
- Occupation: Long distance runner
- Known for: Winner of 1947 Boston Marathon

Korean name
- Hangul: 서윤복
- Hanja: 徐潤福
- RR: Seo Yunbok
- MR: Sŏ Yunbok

Suh Yun-bok (9 January 1923 – 27 June 2017) was a South Korean marathoner, who is best known as the winner of the 1947 Boston Marathon.

He won the race with a world best time of 2:25:39 under the coach Sohn Kee-chung, the Korean winner of the marathon at the 1936 Berlin Olympics. His participation in the Boston Marathon was financed by donations from servicemen in the United States Forces Korea. For half of the race, one of his shoes was untied. At Heartbreak Hill, he was tripped up by a dog that ran out onto the race course.

His win was the first time a world best for the men's marathon was set at the Boston Marathon. The previous world best was set by his coach Sohn in Tokyo, Japan in 1935.

In the weeks leading up to the Boston Marathon, he stayed at the home of Norman Paik in Dedham, Massachusetts.

In 1948, one year after the Boston victory, Suh competed in the marathon at the 1948 Summer Olympics held in London. He retired in 1949.

== Marathon career ==
- May 1946: Champion at the 1st All-Korea Marathon (전조선 마라톤 선수권대회)
- September 1946: Champion at the 1st Korea National Track and Field Meet (전국육상선수권대회)
- October 1946: Champion at the Korean National Sports Festival (전국체육대회)
- April 1947: Set a world record of 2:25:39 at the 51st Boston Marathon
- June 1948: represented South Korea in the 1948 Summer Olympics in London, UK

== See also ==
- List of winners of the Boston Marathon

Records
Preceded by (South Korea) Sohn Kee-chung	Men's Marathon World Record Holder; 19 April 1947 – 14 June 1952	Succeeded by (United Kingdom) James Peters
