= Park Gok-ji =

South Korean film editor (born 1965)

- Born: 28 February 1965 (age 61)
- Other name: Park Kok-ji
- Occupation: Film editor
- Years active: 1987–present
- Spouse: Park Heung-sik

Korean name
- Hangul: 박곡지
- Hanja: 朴曲之
- RR: Bak Gokji
- MR: Pak Kokchi

Park Gok-ji (Korean: 박곡지; born 28 February 1965) is a South Korean film editor. She is married to film director Park Heung-sik, with whom she has several children, and she used her influence within the local industry to aid the production of his second film, The Railroad. Park and her colleague Jeong Jin-hee won Best Editor at the 5th Korean Film Awards for A Dirty Carnival, and received a further nomination for Best Editor at the 1st Asian Film Awards.

== Filmography as editor ==
- The Scent at the Edge of the World (1991)
- General's Son II (1991)
- Like Music, Like Rain (1992)
- The Marriage Life (1992)
- General's Son III (1992)
- May Our Love Stay This Way (1992)
- Seopyeonje (1993)
- The 101st Proposition (1993)
- The Woman and the Man (1993)
- The Man with Breasts (1993)
- No Emergency Exit (1993)
- Deep Scratch (1994)
- A Very Special Transformation (1994)
- 301, 302 (1995)
- Declaration of Genius (1995)
- A Hot Roof (1995)
- Bellybutton Bus (1995)
- The River Flows to Tomorrow (1996)
- The Ginko Bed (1996)
- Seven Reasons Why Beer Is Better Than a Lover (1996)
- Come To Me (1996)
- Born to Kill (1996)
- The Day a Pig Fell into the Well (1996)
- Jungle Story (1996)
- Corset (1996)
- The Adventures of Mrs. Park (1996)
- Crocodile (1996)
- Inch'Alla (1997)
- Lament (1997)
- Mister Condom (1997)
- Do the Right Thing (1997)
- Poison (1997)
- Trio (1997)
- Baby Sale (1997)
- No. 3 (1997)
- Habitual Sadness 2 (1997)
- The Contact (1997)
- Maria and the Inn (1997)
- Wind Echoing in My Being (1997)
- The Hole (1997)
- The Boy's Spear (1997)
- Saturday, 2 p.m. (1998)
- Scent of a Man (1998)
- Kazoku Cinema (1998)
- Dr. K (1999)
- Shiri (1999)
- Rush (1999)
- Calla (1999)
- Fin de Siecle (1999)
- Lies (2000)
- Promenade (2000)
- Vanishing Twin (2000)
- Pisces (2000)
- The Legend of Gingko (2000)
- Friend (2001)
- Failan (2001)
- Turtle Hero (2001)
- Say Yes (2001)
- Kiss Me Much (2001)
- My Wife Is a Gangster (2001)
- Ray-Ban (2001)
- Out of Justice (2001)
- Ciao (2001)
- My Beautiful Girl, Mari (2002)
- Twenty-Four (2002)
- Marriage Is a Crazy Thing (2002)
- Oh! LaLa Sisters (2002)
- Over the Rainbow (2002)
- Champion (2002)
- Boss X File (2002)
- Ardor (2002)
- Madeleine (2003)
- Blue (2003)
- Scent of Love (2003)
- Garden of Heaven (2003)
- Save the Green Planet! (2003)
- Tube (2003)
- Oh! Brothers (2003)
- The Circle (2003)
- North Korean Guys (2003)
- Once Upon a Time in High School (2004)
- Taegukgi (2004)
- Face (2004)
- How to Keep My Love (2004)
- Spin Kick (2004)
- Flying Boys (2004)
- Rikidōzan (2004)
- My Boyfriend Is Type B (2005)
- The Twins (2005)
- Rules of Dating (2005)
- Heaven's Soldiers (2005)
- Mr. Socrates (2005)
- My Girl and I (2005)
- Mr. Wacky (2006)
- A Dirty Carnival (2006)
- To Sir, with Love (2006)
- Holy Daddy (2006)
- Three Fellas (2006)
- Maundy Thursday (2006)
- Mission Sex Control (2006)
- 200 Pounds Beauty (2006)
- My Wife Is a Gangster 3 (2006)
- The Railroad (2007)
- Femme Fatale (2007)
- Let's Not Cry! (2007)
- The Mafia, the Salesman (2007)
- Le Grand Chef (2007)
- Miss Gold Digger (2007)
- My Love (2007)
- Lovers of Six Years (2008)
- Life is Beautiful (2008)
- My New Partner (2008)
- Beyond All Magic (2008)
- Portrait of a Beauty (2008)
- A Frozen Flower (2008)
- The Truth Beneath (2016)
- Pandora (2016)
