= Toshiko D'Elia =

Japanese-American long-distance runner

Toshiko D'Elia (née Kishimoto) (January 2, 1930 – February 19, 2014) was an American Masters athletics long distance running legend. She was a member of the 1996 inaugural class of the Masters division of the USATF National Track and Field Hall of Fame. She holds numerous American long distance running records, primarily in the W75 age division.

== Early life ==
D'Elia was born in Kyoto, Japan. As a child she suffered through near starvation food rationing and a controlling male dominated Japanese society. For example, when she received a Fulbright Scholarship to study in the United States and asked her father to pay for the trip he said that he would rather spend the money on a new horse than waste it on an education for a female.

Encouraged by her mother's wishes for a better life and through determination she went after her own independence. She met an orphaned deaf boy at a Catholic convent in Kyoto and from that developed a passion for educating the deaf. After graduating from Tsuda College in Tokyo, she could find no Special Education training available in post World War II Japan and came to Syracuse University in 1951 as a Fulbright Scholar. She had a brief marriage to an American, that left her as a single mother in 1955. When she tried to return to Japan with her child her father said that she had disgraced the family and must put her daughter up for adoption, but her mother gave her money to return to the U.S. and start a new life. Staying in the U.S. she met and married Italian-American pianist Manfred D'Elia, who had a passion for mountain climbing, and settled in Ridgewood, New Jersey.

== Running career ==
On a climb of Mount Rainier she suffered from altitude sickness and failed to finish the climb. After that, she began to run a mile a day with her daughter, Erica, who in 1974 was part of the first cross country team at Ridgewood High School.

Following the publicity of Katherine Switzer's 1970 incident at the Boston Marathon, women's athletics were a new phenomenon. Women were just beginning to explore their limits in running.

Sometimes, ignorance was bliss. You don't know what you're in for.

This period was also the beginning of the running boom of the 1970s. Another Japanese-American whom D'Elia admired, Miki Gorman, had won the Boston Marathon in 1974. Saying "26 miles is for horses to run, not people," D'Elia ran her first full marathon "by accident" at the Jersey Shore Marathon. On a freezing day when she intended to quit at 15 miles (24 km), but her support didn't show up with a change of clothing, so she kept running to the finish. Her time of 3:25 qualified her to run the Boston Marathon in 1976 where at the age of 46, she was the second recorded Masters female runner (after Sylvia Weiner) in the history of the event, finishing in 3:16:56 on a notoriously hot day. As a form of seeking support for other New Jersey area runners, she and her husband formed the North Jersey Masters Track and Field Club. The following year, she ran 3:04:56, in 1978 she ran 3:04:26 and broke 3 hours for the first time with a 2:58:11 at age 49. Each of those won the Masters division.

Later in 1979, she was diagnosed with cervical cancer, but still ran Boston in April 1980, doing 3:09:07 just 4 months after surgery. She was interviewed by a Japanese reporter after this run and was invited to speak at the Women's World Sports Symposium in Tokyo, which she did. In 1980, she became the first 50-year-old woman to run under 3 hours for the marathon at the World Veteran's Marathon Champions in Glasgow, Scotland, finishing in 2:57:25. For this she received the Runner's World Magazine's Paavo Nurmi Award.

D'Elia became the first woman over 65 to run a sub seven-minute mile indoors. In 1996 she was inducted into the first class of the Masters division of the USATF National Track and Field Hall of Fame.

D'Elia was the top runner at New York Road Runner races throughout the '70s, '80s, and '90s. She was nominated for the New York Road Runners Runner of the Year award an unprecedented 30 times, winning it 27 times. She has been featured in Sports Illustrated, and is part of a permanent exhibit on running legends at the New Balance Armory in Washington Heights, NY. Mary Wittenberg referred to her as "our Queen of the Roads" and added, "She represents the best of running." She and her husband founded the running club North Jersey Masters.

For six years, she nursed her husband while he suffered from Alzheimer's disease. He died in 2000. The North Jersey Masters club holds an annual race on Memorial Day now named for her husband Fred.

In January 2001, D'Elia broke the indoor world record for women age 70 in the 1,500-meter run with a time of 6:47:46. A few weeks later she broke records in the 800-meter, five-kilometer and 10-kilometer runs.

I ran to live happily. It gave me strength. I was able to teach better, I was able to be a better wife and a better mother. . . . Running has always served me as a support and therapy for a happier life.

— Toshiko D'Elia

D'Elia passed on February 19, 2014 at the age of 84.
