= Edward F. Sheehan =

Athlete & coach

Personal information
- Born: June 18, 1958 Weymouth, Massachusetts, U.S.
- Died: May 6, 2005 (aged 46) Silver Spring, Maryland, U.S.
- Occupation(s): Athlete, coach

Sport
- Sport: Running
- Club: Boston Running Club; Boston Athletic Association
- Updated on 18 March 2015

Edward F. Sheehan Jr. (June 18, 1958 – May 6, 2005) was an American elite athlete and coach, a native and longtime resident of Weymouth, Massachusetts. He served as head coach of the Boston Athletic Association, qualified for the US Olympic Marathon Trials in 1980 and 1984, and twice finished in the top 15 in the Boston Marathon (1980 and 1982).

== Early life ==
He graduated from Boston College High School in 1975 and then enrolled at Harvard University, starting out as a pre-med student but changing his major to philosophy. At Harvard, Mr. Sheehan was a standout in cross-country and track and field, holding several university records. He graduated from Harvard in 1979, when he began competing for the BAA, and stayed on to earn his master's in psychology in 1981.

== Career ==
He began his collegiate coaching at Troy State, where he fielded the college's first women's cross-country program. In 1984, he returned to Harvard to coach cross-country and track and field, coaching athletes who attained All-American status. After coaching at Harvard, he coached at the Boston Running Club before joining the Boston Athletic Association in 1994.

Sheehan's personal best in a marathon was 2:13:46, in the 1982 Rocket City Marathon in Huntsville, Alabama. He was a two-time runner-up in the USA Track & Field-New England Road Race Grand Prix Series in 1992 and 1993.

He died of a heart attack May 6, 2005, while running with his wife in Silver Spring, Maryland, at the age of 46.
