= Jock Semple =

Physical therapist and sports official

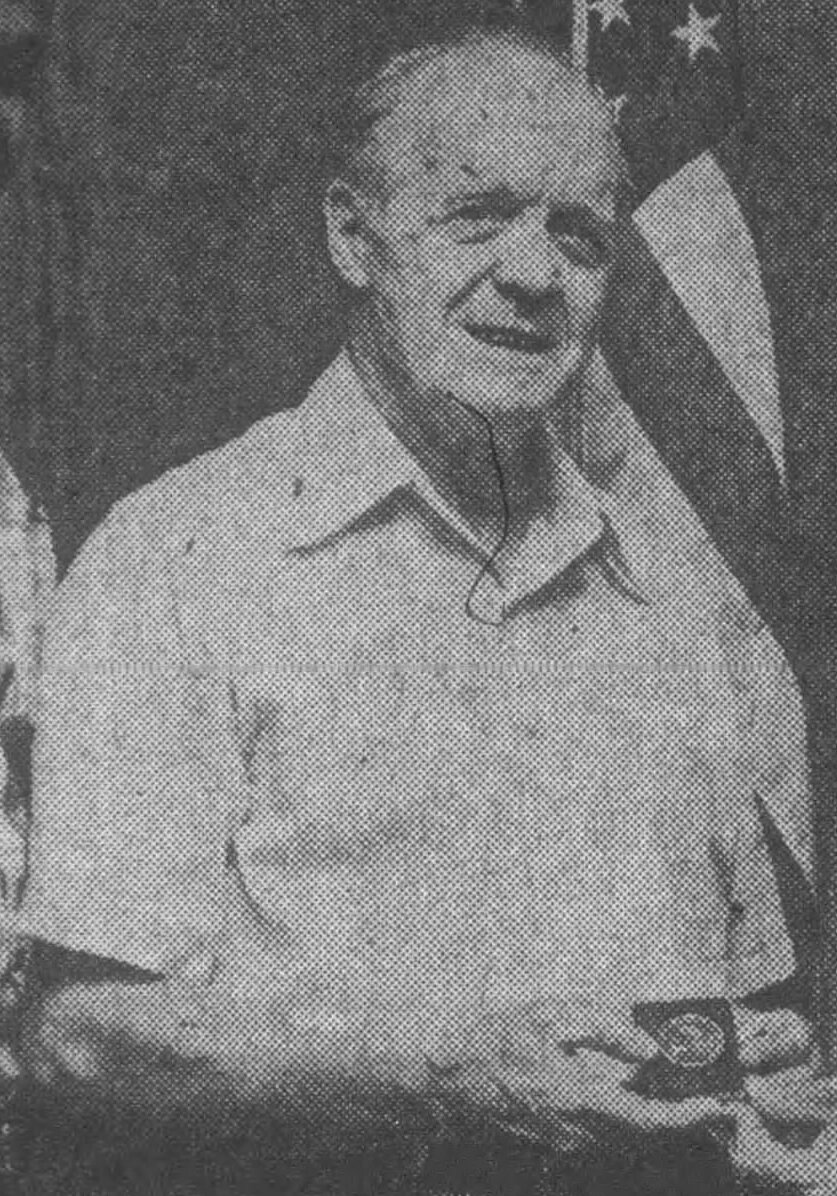
- Semple in 1976
- Born: John Duncan Semple; October 26, 1903; Glasgow, Scotland
- Died: March 10, 1988 (aged 84); Peabody, Massachusetts, U.S.
- Occupation: Athletic therapist / trainer
- Known for: 1967 Boston Marathon incident

John Duncan Semple (October 26, 1903 – March 10, 1988) was a Scottish-American runner, physical therapist, trainer, and sports official. In 1967, as a race official for the Boston Marathon, he attempted to stop the 20-year-old marathon runner Kathrine Switzer from continuing to run and knocked down her coach when he tried to protect her. Switzer was officially entered in the race in accordance with the Boston Marathon's rule book, which at that time made no mention of sex. Semple subsequently claimed that amateur rules banned women racing for more than 1.5 miles (2.4 km). He subsequently oversaw implementation of qualifying times in 1970 and, in response to lobbying and rule changes by the Amateur Athletic Union (AAU), the implementation of a separate women's race in 1972.

== Life and career ==
Semple was born in Glasgow, Scotland, and emigrated to the United States in 1921 to work as a cabinetmaker in Philadelphia. He moved to Boston after running in his first Boston Marathon and began to work in sport-related fields. He was a masseur and physical therapist for the Boston Bruins and the Boston Celtics, and a trainer for Olympic athletes.

Semple was a Boston Marathon race co-director. He had an established history dating back to at least 1957 of physically attacking Boston Marathon runners he perceived to be "non-serious" competitors, whether officially entered or running the course unofficially. In a 1968 interview with Sports Illustrated, he remarked "These screwballs! These weirdies!", crying at the ceiling "These MIT boys! These Tufts characters! These Harvard guys! They write me askin' should they put on spiked shoes for the marathon!" According to fellow race official Will Cloney: "He hurls not only his body at them, but also a rather choice array of epithets... Jock's method of attack is apt to vary." In 1957, Semple narrowly escaped arrest for assault after attempting to knock down a marathon competitor who was wearing webbed snorkeler's shoes and a grotesque mask. "The thing that made me so damned mad," Semple said, "was that the guy was runnin' with the good runners." at the 6.5 miles (10.5 km) mark.

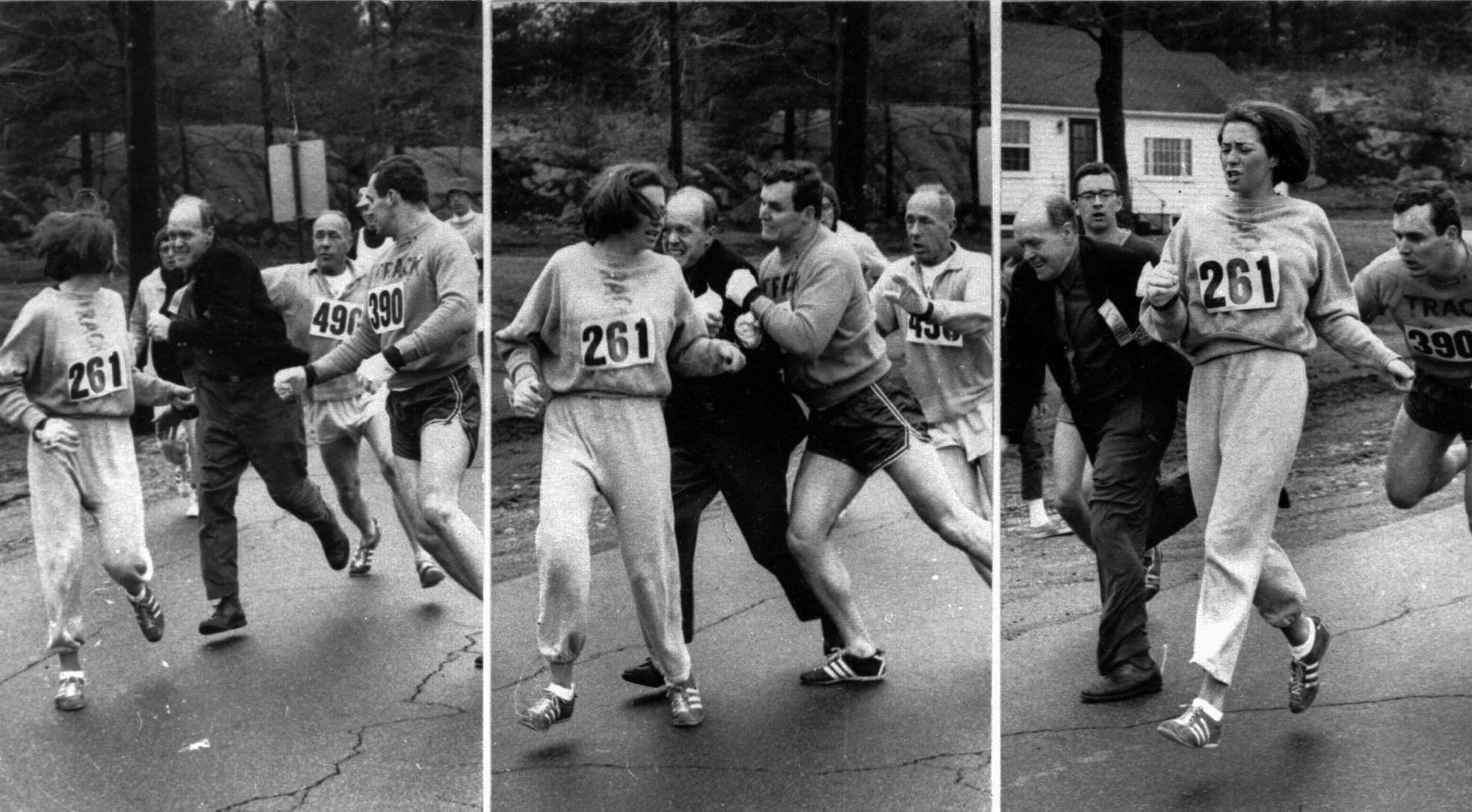
Semple assaulting Kathrine Switzer in an effort to stop her from running the 1967 Boston Marathon; taken by Harry A. Trask

Roberta "Bobbi" Gibb completed the 1967 Boston Marathon unofficially; she had completed the marathon in 1966 having been denied an official entry by race director Will Cloney, who rejected her registration with the claim that women were physiologically incapable of running 26 miles (42 km). Gibb finished the 1966 race in 3 hours, 21 minutes and 40 seconds, ahead of two-thirds of the runners. Another woman, Kathrine Switzer, completed the 1967 race having registered officially. Although the Boston Marathon rule book made no mention of sex, Semple later claimed her race registration was a result of an "oversight" in the entry-screening process. Semple tried to stop Switzer by repeatedly assaulting her as she ran. Switzer wrote in her memoir "A big man, a huge man, with bared teeth was set to pounce, and before I could react he grabbed my shoulder and flung me back, screaming, 'Get the hell out of my race and give me those numbers!'" Switzer's boyfriend Tom Miller managed to shove Semple aside after Semple had knocked Switzer's slightly-built 51-year-old coach to the ground when he attempted to protect Switzer; both Miller and Switzer's coach were competing in the race alongside Switzer. In a 1968 interview, Semple complained that Miller was a hammer thrower. Photographs of Semple attempting to rip Switzer's number off were widespread in the media.

A consequence of Switzer's completion of the 1967 Boston Marathon as an officially registered runner in line with the rules then in force was that the AAU changed its rules to bar women from competing in races against men.

Later in life, Semple reversed his position on women competing in the marathon. According to Marja Bakker (a later organizer of the race), "Once the rule was adjusted and women were allowed in the race, Jock was one of their staunchest supporters. He was very progressive." Semple later publicly reconciled with Switzer. "Old Jock Semple and I became the best of friends," she told a reporter in 2015. "It took a long time: six years. But we became best of friends."

In 1981, he published an autobiography, Just Call Me Jock. He was inducted into the RRCA American Long Distance Running Hall of Fame in 1985.

Semple died of cancer of the liver and pancreas in March 1988 in Peabody, Massachusetts. He and Kathrine Switzer had become friends and she would visit him at the hospital where he was being treated for his cancer. The Jock Semple Award given by the Boston Athletic Association is named in his honor.
