= Roger Robinson (academic) =

New Zealand academic, writer and runner (born 1939)

- Born: 1939 (age 86–87); Sutton Coldfield, England
- Occupations: Academic; essayist; editor; runner; sportswriter; sports commentator
- Title: Emeritus professor
- Spouse: Kathrine Switzer (m. 1987)
- Children: 2

Academic background
- Education: University of Cambridge

Academic work
- Discipline: Literature
- Sub-discipline: New Zealand and Pacific literature; Running in literature
- Institutions: University of Canterbury; Victoria University of Wellington
- Notable works: The Oxford Companion to New Zealand Literature (co-editor, 1998)
- Website: Official website

Roger Derek Robinson (born 1939) is a New Zealand academic, essayist, editor, runner, sportswriter, and sports commentator. Robinson earned his Ph.D. from the University of Cambridge and moved to New Zealand in 1968, where he became an English professor at Victoria University of Wellington. He has expertise in New Zealand literature (co-editing The Oxford Companion to New Zealand Literature in 1998) and literature and journalism relating to running. He has written and edited several books about running, including When Running Made History (2018), and received awards for his sporting journalism. As a runner, he competed internationally from 1966 to 1995 and won marathons at a Masters level in the 1980s.

== Early life and literary career ==
Robinson was born in Sutton Coldfield in 1939, and grew up in London. He earned a master's degree and PhD from the University of Cambridge, and moved to New Zealand in 1968, becoming a naturalised New Zealand citizen in 1977. He became a lecturer at the University of Canterbury. In 1975, he was appointed professor of English at Victoria University in Wellington. He served as dean and vice-chancellor of the university, and head of the English department, during his tenure. For many years, from the 1980s onwards, he divided his time between New Zealand and the United States, holding visiting academic positions at New York University and the Newberry Library in Chicago. In 1981, he founded the first academic journal for New Zealand literature, the Journal of New Zealand Literature, and its first issue was published in 1983.

Together with Nelson Wattie, Robinson edited The Oxford Companion to New Zealand Literature (1998), and himself contributed over 300 entries. It has been described by academic Alan Riach as "indispensable" and a "masterpiece". In 2003, he edited Robert Louis Stevenson: His Best Pacific Writings which was a finalist for the Montana New Zealand Book Awards in 2004. His work has been published in Landfall, The Dictionary of New Zealand Biography, The Oxford Companion to Twentieth Century Poetry (1996) and Readings in Pacific Literature (1993).

Robinson's 2003 book Running in Literature was the first to discuss running as a subject in literature. He was the scriptwriter for running documentary Marathon: A Hero's Journey (Cultural Horizons, 1990). In 2001, he was listed as an outstanding American sportswriter in The Best American Sports Writing. He wrote as a senior journalist for Running Times for many years, and received awards for this work; in 2007, he won the Les Diven Media Award for his coverage of the Boilermaker Road Race, and in 2010, he received an award for excellence in running journalism from the Road Runners Club of America. He has said of his literary work: "Without being pretentious, I want to show running as a subject really worth writing well about, at the absolutely top quality that would apply to professorial work."

In 2011, a Festschrift (collection of tributes) to Robinson with over 50 contributors was published, titled Running Writing Robinson. It included essays and poems as "a gift to and a celebration of Roger Robinson". Contributors included New Zealand writers Fiona Kidman, Joy Cowley and Witi Ihimaera and runner Lorraine Moller.

In 2018, he published When Running Made History, a non-fiction work about the history of running and tracing its development into a professional sport. In a review for Outside, Amby Burfoot called it "one of the best running books ever written—if not the very best". Geoff Watson in the New Zealand Review of Books praised Robinson's tracing of the development of running as a sport. He said the book "has been widely and rightfully acclaimed [and] is among the most readable and rewarding works of sports history ever published". In the same year, he received a media reporting excellence award from the American Academy of Orthopaedic Surgeons for an article about his knee replacement surgeries.

== Sporting career and personal life ==
As a nine-year-old, Robinson saw Emil Zátopek win the 10,000m event at the 1948 Summer Olympics, which inspired him to start running seriously. He began competing in running events for England in 1966, and would later compete for New Zealand internationally until 1995, including representing New Zealand at the 1977 IAAF World Cross Country Championships. In the 1980s, Robinson won his Masters age category at the Boston Marathon (2:20:15 in 1984), the Vancouver Marathon, and the New York City Marathon. For forty years he worked as an announcer or commentator for sporting events, including notably the 10,000m race at the 1974 Commonwealth Games, won by Dick Tayler, and the 1981 New York City Marathon.

In 1983, Robinson met runner and author Kathrine Switzer while speaking at a running national championship in New Zealand. They married in 1987. Robinson has two children from a previous marriage. In 2006, Robinson and Switzer co-authored 26.2: Marathon Stories, an illustrated history of the marathon. In 2016, they both appeared in the Swiss documentary film Free to Run, about the history of marathon running. He has continued running into his 70s and 80s following replacement of his right knee in 2011 and his left knee in 2017; he has nicknamed his knees Russell and Mark respectively, after the surgeons who carried out the operations. In 2019 he established the Roger Robinson Scholarship for competitive runners at Victoria University. In February 2022, he held the over-80s New Zealand men's mile record, and in May 2022 won the men's over-80 category of the National Senior Games 10K in Florida. As of 2022 Robinson and Switzer divide their time between homes in New Paltz and New Zealand.

Of continuing to race into his 80s, Robinson has said:

I learn that one of the joys of being a long-term runner is that every season is an experiment, a new experience. Year by year, you test your changing body, your mind's ingenuity, and your spirit's resilience against each inevitable stage of getting older. Those who choose to retire at their peak may think they evade the losses time brings, but they can only look back, not forward. They miss this ongoing journey, which truly is an exploration of the whole of life, its last 6.2 miles as well as the first 20.

== Selected works ==
=== As editor ===
- The Way of All Flesh by Samuel Butler (Pan Classics, 1976) (includes introduction and notes)
- Poems for the Eighties (Wai-te-ata Press, 1979)
- Katherine Mansfield: In from the Margin (Louisianan State University Press, 1994)
- The Oxford Companion to New Zealand Literature (Oxford University Press, 1998), with Nelson Wattie
- Writing Wellington: Twenty Years of Victoria University Writing Fellows (Victoria University Press, 1999)
- Anno Domini 2000: or Woman's Destiny by Julius Vogel (Exisle, 2000, University of Hawaii Press, 2002) (includes introduction)
- The God Boy by Ian Cross (Penguin Modern Classics, 2003) (includes introduction)
- Robert Louis Stevenson: His Best Pacific Writings (Streamline & Bess Press, 2003)

=== Essays ===
- Introduction to Pocket Collected Poems by Alistair Te Ariki Campbell (Hazard Press, 1996)
- Essay on Thomas Hardy in The Oxford Reader's Companion to Hardy (OUP, 2000)

=== Non-fiction ===
- Landscapes (Art Society Press, 1963)
- Victoriana (Art Society Press, 1963, revised ed. 1967)
- Heroes and Sparrows: a Celebration of Running (Southwester, 1986)
- A Hero's Journey (Cultural Horizons, 1990) (documentary script)
- The Story of Hong Gildong (Wai-te-ata Press, 1995)
- Running in Literature (Breakaway Books, 2003)
- 26.2: Marathon Stories (Rodale, 2006), together with Kathrine Switzer
- When Running Made History (Syracuse University Press, 2018)
- Running Throughout Time: The Greatest Running Stories Ever Told (Meyer & Meyer Sport, 2022)
