= Harry A. Trask =

American photojournalist

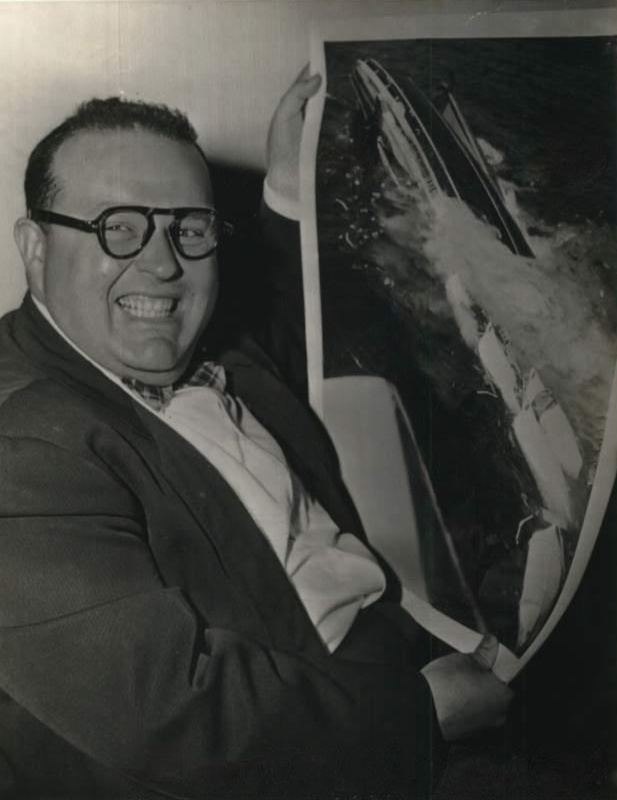
Trask in 1957 with his photo of the sinking of the SS Andrea Doria

Harry A. Trask (1928–2002) was an American photojournalist. He received the 1957 Pulitzer Prize for Photography for his reportage of the Italian cruise ship SS Andrea Doria sinking into the Atlantic Ocean.

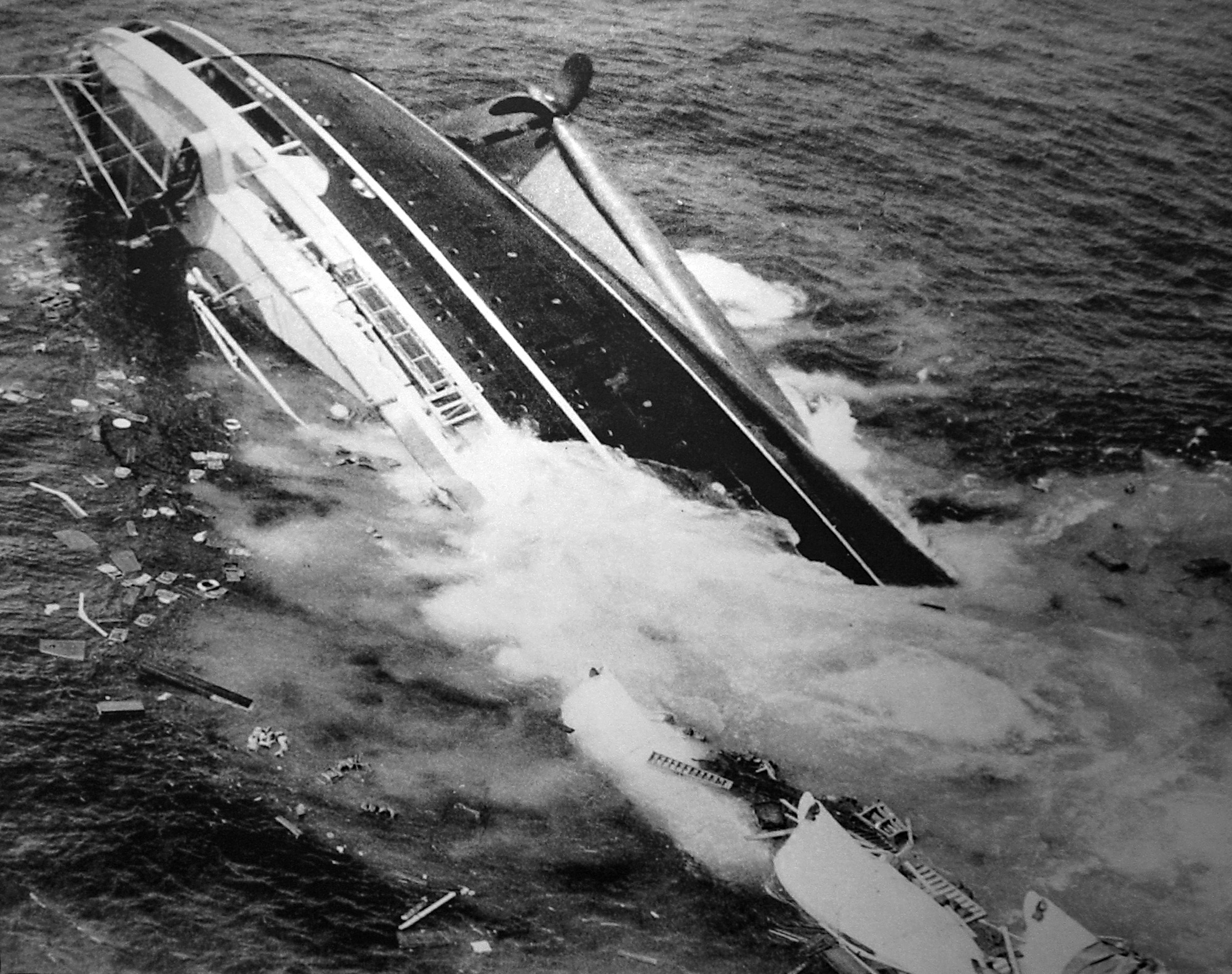
Sinking of the SS Andrea Doria.

== Pulitzer Prize for Photography ==
Trask was a staff photographer for the Boston Evening Traveller when he photographed the Italian cruise ship SS Andrea Doria sinking into the Atlantic Ocean off the coast of Nantucket, Massachusetts. His pictures were widely published, including in Life magazine, and won him the 1957 Pulitzer Prize for Photography. Trask was using a 4×5 Speed Graphic camera from a light airplane. It is the second picture in the sequence, taken from a height of 75 feet, nine minutes before the ship sank, that won the Pulitzer Prize. His sequence continues to show the ship sinking.

== Kathrine Switzer Boston Marathon photograph ==
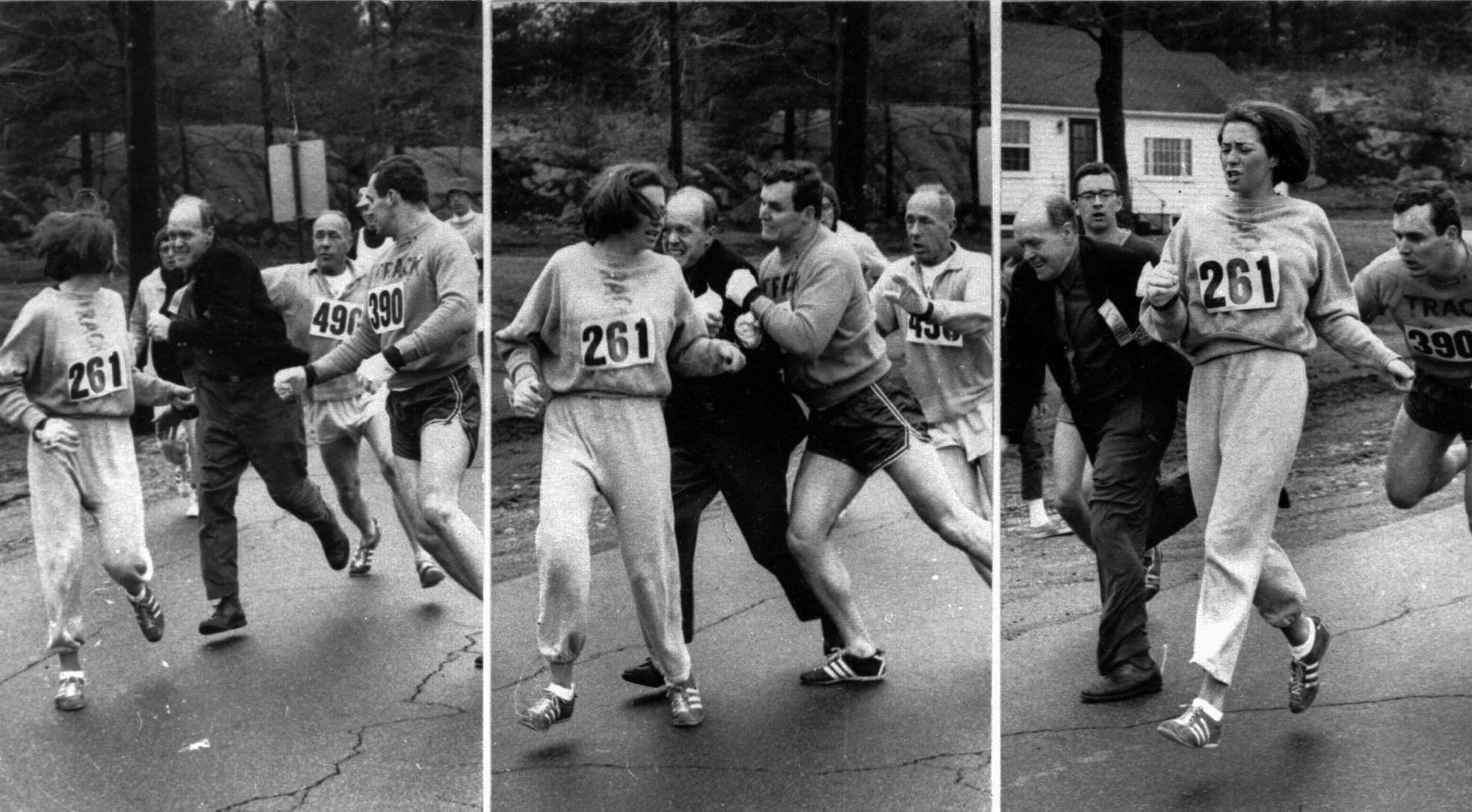
Trask's photo sequence of Jock Semple attacking runner Kathrine Switzer in the 1967 Boston Marathon

Trask photographed Kathrine Switzer being attacked by race organiser Jock Semple for being a woman and officially running in the 1967 Boston Marathon.
