= Boston Marathon Qualifying Standards =

Qualifications for participating in the Boston Marathon

Boston Marathon qualifying standards allow runners to qualify for the Boston Marathon by running a previous marathon with a stipulated result within a stipulated calendar time frame.

The standards have been in place since 1970 for male runners and 1972 for female runners. The standards are published by the Boston Athletic Association (B.A.A.), in advance of the qualifying window.

To "qualify" for the Boston Marathon runners need to have run a marathon at a time given for their gender and age (as shown in the tables below). Before the 2012 marathon, qualification allowed runners to register and run the race. Since 2012, "qualifiers" who do not meet additional cutoff criteria (see below) are not eligible to enter the marathon by virtue of time qualification.

== Men’s qualifying standards by year ==
Race year	18–34*	35–39	40–44	45–49	50–54	55–59	60–64	65–69	70–74	75–79	80+	Cutoff (m:ss)	Reference
2027	2:55	3:00	3:05	3:15	3:20	3:30	3:50	4:05	4:20	4:35	4:50	5:17	
2026	2:55	3:00	3:05	3:15	3:20	3:30	3:50	4:05	4:20	4:35	4:50	4:34	
2025	3:00	3:05	3:10	3:20	3:25	3:35	3:50	4:05	4:20	4:35	4:50	6:51	
2024	3:00	3:05	3:10	3:20	3:25	3:35	3:50	4:05	4:20	4:35	4:50	5:29	
2023	3:00	3:05	3:10	3:20	3:25	3:35	3:50	4:05	4:20	4:35	4:50	0:00	
2022	3:00	3:05	3:10	3:20	3:25	3:35	3:50	4:05	4:20	4:35	4:50	0:00	
2021	3:00	3:05	3:10	3:20	3:25	3:35	3:50	4:05	4:20	4:35	4:50	7:47	
2020	3:00	3:05	3:10	3:20	3:25	3:35	3:50	4:05	4:20	4:35	4:50	1:39	
2019	3:05	3:10	3:15	3:25	3:30	3:40	3:55	4:10	4:25	4:40	4:55	4:52	
2018	3:05	3:10	3:15	3:25	3:30	3:40	3:55	4:10	4:25	4:40	4:55	3:23	
2017	3:05	3:10	3:15	3:25	3:30	3:40	3:55	4:10	4:25	4:40	4:55	2:09	
2016	3:05	3:10	3:15	3:25	3:30	3:40	3:55	4:10	4:25	4:40	4:55	2:28	
2015	3:05	3:10	3:15	3:25	3:30	3:40	3:55	4:10	4:25	4:40	4:55	1:02	
2014	3:05	3:10	3:15	3:25	3:30	3:40	3:55	4:10	4:25	4:40	4:55	1:38	
2013	3:05	3:10	3:15	3:25	3:30	3:40	3:55	4:10	4:25	4:40	4:55	0:00	
2012	3:10	3:15	3:20	3:30	3:35	3:45	4:00	4:15	4:30	4:45	5:00	1:14	
2003–2011	3:10	3:15	3:20	3:30	3:35	3:45	4:00	4:15	4:30	4:45	5:00	—	
1990–2002	3:10	3:15	3:20	3:25	3:30	3:35	3:40	3:45	3:50			—	
1987–1989	3:00		3:10		3:20		3:30					—	
1984–1986	2:50		3:10		3:20		3:30					—	
1981–1983	2:50		3:10		3:20							—	
1980	2:50		3:10									—	
1977–1979	3:00		3:30									—	
1972–1976	3:30 (or 20 kilometers in 1:25, 15 miles in 1:45, or 20 miles in 2:30)											—	
1971	3:30 (or 10 miles in 1:05; 15 miles in 1:45, or 20 miles in 2:30)											—	
1970	4:00											—	

- Note: the minimum age before 1986 was 19.

== Women’s qualifying standards by year ==
Race year	18–34*	35–39	40–44	45–49	50–54	55–59	60–64	65–69	70–74	75–79	80+	Cutoff (m:ss)	Reference
2027	3:25	3:30	3:35	3:45	3:50	4:00	4:20	4:35	4:50	5:05	5:20	5:17	
2026	3:25	3:30	3:35	3:45	3:50	4:00	4:20	4:35	4:50	5:05	5:20	4:34	
2025	3:30	3:35	3:40	3:50	3:55	4:05	4:20	4:35	4:50	5:05	5:20	6:51	
2024	3:30	3:35	3:40	3:50	3:55	4:05	4:20	4:35	4:50	5:05	5:20	5:29	
2023	3:30	3:35	3:40	3:50	3:55	4:05	4:20	4:35	4:50	5:05	5:20	0:00	
2022	3:30	3:35	3:40	3:50	3:55	4:05	4:20	4:35	4:50	5:05	5:20	0:00	
2021	3:30	3:35	3:40	3:50	3:55	4:05	4:20	4:35	4:50	5:05	5:20	7:47	
2020	3:30	3:35	3:40	3:50	3:55	4:05	4:20	4:35	4:50	5:05	5:20	1:39	
2019	3:35	3:40	3:45	3:55	4:00	4:10	4:25	4:40	4:55	5:10	5:25	4:52	
2018	3:35	3:40	3:45	3:55	4:00	4:10	4:25	4:40	4:55	5:10	5:25	3:23	
2017	3:35	3:40	3:45	3:55	4:00	4:10	4:25	4:40	4:55	5:10	5:25	2:09	
2016	3:35	3:40	3:45	3:55	4:00	4:10	4:25	4:40	4:55	5:10	5:25	2:28	
2015	3:35	3:40	3:45	3:55	4:00	4:10	4:25	4:40	4:55	5:10	5:25	1:02	
2014	3:35	3:40	3:45	3:55	4:00	4:10	4:25	4:40	4:55	5:10	5:25	1:38	
2013	3:35	3:40	3:45	3:55	4:00	4:10	4:25	4:40	4:55	5:10	5:25	0:00	
2012	3:40	3:45	3:50	4:00	4:05	4:15	4:30	4:45	5:00	5:15	5:30	1:14	
2003–2011	3:40	3:45	3:50	4:00	4:05	4:15	4:30	4:45	5:00	5:15	5:30	—	
1990–2002	3:40	3:45	3:50	3:55	4:00	4:05	4:10	4:15	4:20			—	
1987–1989	3:30		3:40		3:50		4:00					—	
1984–1986	3:20		3:30		3:40		3:50					—	
1981–1983	3:20		3:30									—	
1980	3:20											—	
1977–1979	3:30											—	
1972–1976	3:30 (or 20 kilometers in 1:25, 15 miles in 1:45, or 20 miles in 2:30)											—	

- Note: the minimum age before 1986 was 19.

== Cutoff ==
Beginning with the registration for the 2012 Boston Marathon, a cutoff beneath the qualifying times was instituted. The cutoff time is given in minutes and seconds and is subtracted from the age group qualifying times to determine who will be allowed entry and who will not. For example, for the 2012 marathon, when registration closed and the 1:14 cutoff was announced, a runner who "qualified" with a time faster than 3:10:00, actually needed a time of 3:08:46 to earn entry into the marathon.

History of Boston Marathon cutoff times
Year	18-34 men's base	Cutoff	Net time to Qualify	Delta from 1990-2012
2027	2:55	5:17	2:49:43	20:17
2026	2:55	4:34	2:50:26	19:34
2025	3:00	6:51	2:53:09	16:51
2024	3:00	5:29	2:54:31	15:29
2023	3:00	0:00	3:00:00	10:00
2022	3:00	0:00	3:00:00	10:00
2021	3:00	7:47	2:52:13	17:47
2020	3:00	1:39	2:58:21	11:39
2019	3:05	4:52	3:00:08	9:52
2018	3:05	3:23	3:01:37	8:23
2017	3:05	2:09	3:01:55	7:09
2016	3:05	2:28	3:02:32	7:28
2015	3:05	1:02	3:03:58	6:02
2014	3:05	1:38	3:03:22	6:38
2013	3:05	0:00	3:05:00	5:00
2012	3:10	1:14	3:08:46	1:14

== Net downhill course penalty ==
In June 2025, the Boston Marathon announced a net-downhill time adjustment, commonly referred to as the "downhill penalty". Effective starting with the 2027 Boston Marathon, the rule penalizes or disqualifies times achieved on net downhill courses with gravity-assisted finishes. The elevation drop is determined strictly by calculating the start line elevation minus the finish line elevation. Under the new guidelines, submitted times from courses with a net drop between 1,500 and 2,999 feet (457.2 to 914.1 meters) incur a five-minute (+5:00) penalty added to the runner's qualifying time, while courses dropping between 3,000 and 5,999 feet (914.2 to 1,828.5 meters) incur a ten-minute (+10:00) penalty. Any marathon course featuring a net drop of 6,000 feet (1,828.6 meters) or more is completely disallowed for qualifying purposes.

Estimates indicated that the downhill course penalty decreased the number of qualifiers from net downhill races from about 3,400 to about 1,600 or a decrease of around 1,800 applicants.
