= Trail's End Marathon =

Annual marathon race in Oregon, United States

The Trail’s End Marathon is an annual road marathon held in Seaside, Oregon. Established by at least 1970, it is one of the early modern marathons in the United States and attracted national attention during the early growth of distance running in the late 20th century.

== History ==
By the early 1970s, the Trail’s End Marathon was a well-established event on the American road-racing calendar. It received nationwide coverage through syndicated wire services and major newspapers, often highlighting distinctive participants and social aspects of long-distance running.

The race became known for attracting older and nontraditional competitors, including Dr. Larry Hilt, a 71-year-old runner whose planned participation in the 1971 edition was widely reported in national newspapers.

== Women’s participation ==
In 1972, the Trail’s End Marathon played a role in the early history of women’s marathon running in the United States. That year, the Amateur Athletic Union–sanctioned women’s marathon was held in conjunction with the men’s race. Seventeen women competed officially, with Elaine Pedersen winning in 3:27:13. This event took place during a period when women were still barred from officially entering several major marathons, making the Trail’s End Marathon one of the early venues for sanctioned women’s marathon competition in North America.

== Public and cultural attention ==
The Trail’s End Marathon also attracted broader cultural attention beyond competitive athletics. In 1972, Jim Dunne, mayor of Pullman, Washington, publicly challenged other mayors to compete in the race, a gesture that was reported nationally through United Press International.
