= Will Cloney =

American athletics administrator

William Thomas Cloney (October 29, 1911 – January 16, 2003) was an American athletics administrator who was the race director of the Boston Marathon from 1946 to 1982 and president of the Boston Athletic Association from 1964 to 1982.

== Early life and professional career ==
Cloney was born and raised in Dorchester and graduated Boston Latin School. In 1931, he joined the staff of the Boston Herald. After graduating from Harvard in 1933, Cloney taught and coached football and hockey at Roxbury Latin School while continuing to work as a sportswriter. From 1936 to 1953, he was a journalism professor at Northeastern University. He was also the school's publicity director. During World War II, Cloney was an officer in the Field Artillery Branch of the United States Army. He was the sports editor of The Boston Post from 1953 until the paper ceased publication in 1956. He then served as the vice president of public relations at Keystone Custodian Funds until his retirement in 1977.

== Boston Athletic Association ==
In 1946, Boston Athletic Association president Walter A. Brown appointed Cloney to the unpaid part-time position of meet and race director. In 1964 he succeeded Brown as president of the B.A.A. During Cloney's tenure with the B.A.A., the Boston Marathon grew from a small event that took little planning into a near full-time job. The number of entrants grew from 116 in 1946 to 7,647 in 1982. He made most decisions regarding the marathon unilaterally.

Cloney also oversaw the Boston Athletic Association Indoor Games, an indoor invitational track meet held at the Boston Garden and the B.A.A.'s annual schoolboy meet, which was held on the same day as the B.A.A. Games. When Cloney first became race director, the B.A.A. Games, not the marathon, was the association's premier event. It attracted top athletes, including Cornelius Warmerdam, Wes Santee, and Ron Delany. However, as the years went on, attendance declined (dropping from 13,645 in 1960 to 9,008 in 1971) and overhead costs increased, making the meet unprofitable. In 1971, Cloney made the decision to end the B.A.A. meet.

In 1966, Cloney rejected Bobbi Gibb's application to enter the race on the grounds that women were physiologically incapable of running 26 miles. Gibb nevertheless ran unregistered and finished the 1966 race in three hours, twenty-one minutes and forty seconds. The following year, Cloney and Jock Semple attempted to physically remove Kathrine Switzer's numbered bib off of her running clothes. Switzer got away and finished the race. Semple's attack was captured by photographers and the melee on the course made international headlines. After the race, Cloney stated that "Women can't run in the Marathon because the rules forbid it. Unless we have rules, society will be in chaos. I don't make the rules, but I try to carry them out. We have no space in the Marathon for any unauthorized person, even a man. If that girl were my daughter, I would spank her." In 1972, women were allowed to officially enter the Marathon.

In 1980, Cloney disqualified women's winner Rosie Ruiz after a week-long investigation by the B.A.A. found that she had jumped into the race in the final mile. The following year he had to persuade the mayor of Newton, Massachusetts to allow the race to pass through his city and talk Boston Police Department officers out of picketing the race.

In 1981, with the Amateur Athletic Federation and the International Long Distance Race Directors Association both developing systems to pay runners, Cloney made the decision to commercialize the Boston Marathon, which had never before awarded prize money. He signed a contract with Boston lawyer Marshall Medoff that made him the race's exclusive sponsorship agent and allowed Medoff keep any money he raised beyond a certain figure. The decision to commercialize the race was controversial and caused its longtime benefactor, Prudential Insurance Company, to end its relationship with the Boston Marathon. The contract with Medoff was also criticized because it was possible that Medoff could take in significantly more money from sponsors than the race organizers. On June 16, 1982, Cloney resigned under pressure from the B.A.A. board of directors. In 1984, the Massachusetts Supreme Judicial Court ruled that Medoff's contract was "void and unenforceable".

== Later life ==
After leaving the B.A.A., Cloney remained involved in marathon racing as chairman of the Association of International Marathons and Distance Races and a commentator for WNEV-TV's coverage of the Boston Marathon. He spent his later years residing in Duxbury, Massachusetts.

Cloney died on January 16, 2003, at South Shore Hospital. He was survived by his wife of 65 years and two daughters. He predeceased by a daughter and a son, William III, who was killed in Vietnam.

Sporting positions
Preceded by Walter A. Brown	President of the Boston Athletic Association; 1964 – 1982	Succeeded by Tom Brown
