= Marja Bakker =

Dutch sports administrator (1947 - 2006)

Marja Bakker (1947–2006) was a Dutch sports administrator who organized the Boston Marathon and became the first woman to serve as president of the Boston Athletic Association (B.A.A.) Running Club.

== Biography ==
Bakker was born on April 20, 1947, in Vlaardingen, the Netherlands. She joined the Boston Athletic Association Running Club in 1978 and became its president in 1982. In 1984, she became the first woman elected to the club's board of governors. By 1987, she held the position of staff administrator of the Boston Marathon.

Bakker served on the board of governors for USA Track & Field-New England and was a member of the executive committee for women's long-distance running for USA Track & Field. She also participated in the national organization's championship site selection subcommittee.

In 2006, Bakker also contributed to the B.A.A.'s successful bid to host the women's marathon for the 2008 U.S. Olympic trials.
