= Joann Flaminio =

American businesswoman

Joann E. Flaminio is an American executive director in the investment industry, and was the first female president of the Boston Athletic Association from 2011 to 2017.
