= Elaine Pedersen =

American long-distance runner (1936–2000)

Elaine Pedersen (December 27, 1936 – March 6, 2000), also known as Pedie, was an American long-distance runner.

== Biography ==
Pedersen lived in San Francisco, California, United States, and worked as an airline stewardess.

Perdersen began running in 1966, but was often kicked out of local road races. She was the first woman to run in the Dipsea Race in 1966 and the Bay to Breakers in 1967.

Pedersen applied to enter the Boston Marathon, but was rejected each time that she applied due to the men-only barrier in long-distance running. She waited on the side-lines of the marathon to join the race unofficially on two occasions and once with her boyfriend's number. In 1972, Pedersen was officially allowed to compete in the Boston Marathon alongside 8 other women. She recorded a time of 3 hours 20 minutes and 38 seconds and came second to the winner of the official women's category, Nina Kuscik.

Also in 1972, Pedersen won the Amateur Athletic Union–sanctioned women’s marathon at the Trail's End Marathon in Seaside, Oregon with a time of 3 hours 27 minutes 13 seconds.

After 1972, Pedersen ran a further 20 marathons in the San Francisco Bay Area.

Pedersen died from bone marrow cancer and pneumonia on March 6, 2000, aged 63.
