= Robert F. Clark =

American banker and political figure

- Born: May 20, 1838; Boston, Massachusetts, US
- Died: January 30, 1912 (aged 73); Milton, Massachusetts, U.S.
- Resting place: Mount Auburn Cemetery
- Occupation: Stock broker
- Known for: Chairman of the Boston Police Commission; First president of the Boston Athletic Association
- Spouse: Margarita Jones (m. 1865)
- Children: 1
- Relatives: Ellery Harding Clark (brother)

Robert Farley Clark (May 20, 1838–January 30, 1912) was an American banker, political figure, and sportsman who served as chairman of the Boston Police Commission and was the first president of the Boston Athletic Association.

== Early life ==
Clark was born in Boston to Benjamin Cutler and Mary Preston Clark. He attended Boston Public Schools and graduated from Boston Latin School in 1856. During his youth, Clark was a standout rower. In 1857 he was a member of the 6-man Volant crew that was the champion of the Charles River Association and beat the Huron crew made up of Harvard students Samuel B. Parkman, Charles F. Walcott, William H. Elliot, William G. Goldsmith, Alexander Agassiz, and James J. Storrow. After graduating, Clark worked for his father, who was a prominent Boston importer.

== Military service ==
On September 2, 1861, Clark enlisted in the Union Army. Clark was commissioned a captain in the 24th Massachusetts Infantry Regiment. He took part in Burnside's North Carolina Expedition and fought in the battles of Roanoke Island, New Bern, Goldsborough Bridge, White Hall, and Tranter's Creek. He then served as a senior aide to brigadier general Thomas G. Stevenson and was with him at the Second Battle of Fort Wagner. Clark was ordered to return home following his father's death and was honorably discharged from the army on February 5, 1864.

== Business career ==
After leaving the Army, Clark became a stock broker in Boston. He was associated with the firm of Hayden, Stone & Co. and was treasurer of the Boston Stock Exchange.

== Boston Athletic Association ==
Clark was one of the original members of the Boston Athletic Association and was chosen to serve as the organization's first president. He did not seek a second term due to business obligations.

== Boston police commission ==
On March 30, 1893, Clark was nominated for a seat on the Boston police commission by Governor William E. Russell. Clark had never sought political office before and was not affiliated with any political party. He was confirmed by the Massachusetts Governor's Council on April 13, 1893, and took office on May 1. He was reappointed by Governor Roger Wolcott in 1898. The following year, Clark was designated chairman of the commission by Governor Wolcott. Clark's two colleagues on the commission (Charles P. Curtis Jr. and Harry F. Adams) designed him the sole spokesman for the board. In 1893, Governor John L. Bates chose not to reappoint Clark and he was succeeded by William H. Emmons.

== Personal life ==
In 1865, Clark married Margarita Jones, daughter of John Coffin Jones Jr. They had one son, Robert J. Clark.

Clark died on January 13, 1912, at his home in Milton, Massachusetts.
