= Bobbi Gibb =

American marathon runner (born 1942)

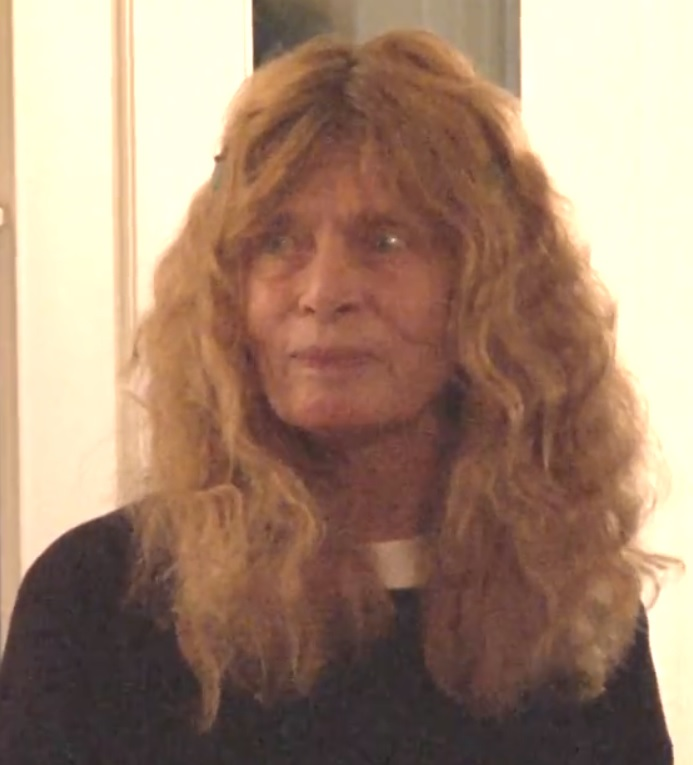
Bobbi Gibb at the 26.2 Foundation in 2016

Roberta Louise Gibb (born November 2, 1942) is an American former runner who was the first woman to have run the entire Boston Marathon (1966). She is recognized by the Boston Athletic Association (B.A.A.) as the pre-sanctioned era women's winner in 1966, 1967, and 1968. At the Boston Marathon, the pre-sanctioned era comprised the years from 1966 through 1971, when women, who under Amateur Athletic Union (AAU) rules could not compete in the Men's Division, ran and finished the race. In 1996 the B.A.A. retroactively recognized as champions the women who finished first in the Pioneer Women's Division Marathon for the years 1966–1971.

Gibb's run in 1966 challenged prevalent prejudices and misconceptions about women's athletic capabilities. In 1967, she finished nearly an hour ahead of Kathrine Switzer. In 1968 Gibb finished first among five women that ran the marathon. It was not until late 1971, pursuant to a petition to the AAU by Nina Kuscsik, that the AAU changed its rules and began to sanction women's division marathons. Kuscsik won the initial AAU-sanctioned women's division race at Boston in 1972.

== Early life ==
Born in Cambridge, Massachusetts, Gibb grew up in the suburbs of Boston during the 1940s and 1950s. She studied at the Boston Museum of Fine Arts and Tufts University School of Special Studies. Her father was a professor of chemistry at Tufts. She was already running long distances. Her running included daily commuting of the eight miles to school. She ran in white leather Red Cross nurses' shoes because there were no running shoes available for women at the time.

== Boston Marathon ==
Before 1966, the longest Amateur Athletic Union (AAU)-sanctioned race for women was one and a half miles. Until 1972, when the first women's division marathon opened, the Boston Marathon was an AAU men's division race. Under the AAU rules, women are not able to run in men's division races.

Gibb trained for two years to run the Boston Marathon, covering as much as 40 miles in one day. On writing for an application in February 1966, she received a letter from the race director, Will Cloney, informing her that women were not physiologically capable of running marathon distances and that under the rules that governed amateur sports set out by the AAU, women were not allowed to run more than a mile and a half competitively. She realized that it was more important than ever to run and that her run would have a social significance far beyond just her own personal challenge.

After three nights and four days on a bus from San Diego, California, Gibb arrived the day before the race at her parents' house in Winchester, Massachusetts. On the morning of Patriots' Day, April 19, 1966, her mother dropped her off at the start in Hopkinton. Wearing her brother's Bermuda shorts and a blue hooded sweatshirt over a black, tanked-top swim suit, she hid in the bushes near the starting pen. After the starting gun fired, she waited until about half the pack had started and then jumped into the race.

The men soon realized that she was a woman. Encouraged by their friendliness and support, she removed her sweatshirt. To her delight and relief, the crowds cheered to see a woman running. The press began to report on her progress towards Boston.

Diana Chapman Walsh, later President of Wellesley College, recalled the day years later:

That was my senior year at Wellesley. As I had done every spring since I arrived on campus, I went out to cheer the runners. But there was something different about that Marathon Day—like a spark down a wire, the word spread to all of us lining the route that a woman was running the course. For a while, the "screech tunnel" fell silent. We scanned face after face in breathless anticipation until just ahead of her, through the excited crowd, a ripple of recognition shot through the lines and we cheered as we never had before. We let out a roar that day, sensing that this woman had done more than just break the gender barrier in a famous race…

By the time Gibb reached the finish line in Boston, the Governor of Massachusetts, John Volpe, was there to shake her hand. She finished in three hours, twenty-one minutes and forty seconds, ahead of two-thirds of the runners. The following morning her feat was front-page news in the Record American, where the headline read: "Hub Bride First Gal to Run Marathon." In another Record American article entitled "Roberta Gets Official Support: Females May Run Marathon", Jack Kendall wrote:

Bobbi Gibb the runner may revolutionize Boston's fabled BAA marathon — and for that matter every other long distance run staged in the country. Even as the bunions acquired from Tuesday's grueling 26 mile, 385 yard race were subsiding, the furor over a woman's intrusion into what had been an all-male domain was mounting.
...
But a spokesman from the New England Amateur Athletic Union has already decided it may be a woman's world after all.
THAT WOULD CHANGE RULES
He plans personally to contact the organization's national headquarters and seek consideration for suspension of the NAAU rules so that a female who wishes to compete in the marathon can do so.
In his opinion the only way the rule could be circumvented would be through suspension of the rules.

In an article from the Boston Traveler dated April 20, 1966, the day following the marathon, Cloney is quoted questioning the authenticity of Gibb even participating in the race. "Mrs Bingay (Gibb) did not run in yesterday's marathon. There is no such thing as a marathon for a woman. She may have run in a road race, but she did not race in the marathon. I have no idea of this woman running. She was not at any of our checkpoints and none of our checkers saw her. For all I know she could have jumped in at Kenmore Square." Told of this Mrs. Bingay (Gibb) said "If you don't believe me, ask the runners who saw me. Or the spectators who were cheering me. I don't want to get into a public debate with Mr. Cloney about it. If he doesn't believe me, that's his business".

The May 2, 1966, issue of Sports Illustrated featured an article written by Gwilym S. Brown entitled “A Game Girl In A Man's Game”:

Last week a tidy-looking and pretty 23-year-old blonde named Roberta Gibb Bingay not only started but also covered the 26-mile, 385-yard course at a clip fast enough to finish ahead of no fewer than 290 of the event's 415 starters.

In 1967, Gibb, by then a full-time student at the University of California, San Diego, ran again. She finished in three hours, twenty-seven minutes and seventeen seconds, almost an hour ahead of Kathrine Switzer, another female competitor. In 1968, Gibb ran again, finishing in three hours and thirty minutes, first among a growing number of women, which included Carol Ann Pancko, Elaine Pedersen, and Marjorie Fish. In 1969, 1970, and 1971, Sara Mae Berman was the women's winner, and in 1972, Nina Kuscsik was the winner of the first officially sanctioned women's division event.

In 1996, at the 100th running of the Boston Marathon and the 30th anniversary of Gibb's first run of it, the Boston Athletic Association officially recognized her three wins in 1966, 1967, and 1968 and awarded her a medal. Her name was inscribed with the names of the other winners on the Boston Marathon Memorial in Copley Square.

In 2016, Gibb was the grand marshal of that year's Boston Marathon. That year's female winner, Atsede Baysa, gave Gibb her trophy; Gibb said that she would go to Baysa's native Ethiopia in 2017 and return it to her. As it turned out, Baysa came to Boston and Gibb returned the trophy to her at that time.

In 2021, a statue of Gibb called “The Girl Who Ran”, depicting her becoming the first woman to finish the Boston Marathon, was unveiled at the Hopkinton Center for the Arts. Gibb herself created the statue.

== Education and career ==
Gibb received her Bachelor of Science (B.S.) degree from the University of California, San Diego, in 1969, fulfilling the pre-medical requirements, with a major in philosophy and a minor in mathematics. She has reported she was denied admission to medical school because of her gender. Gibb then worked with Professor Jerome Lettvin at MIT on epistemology and color vision while studying law. In 1974, Gibb entered the New England School of Law, receiving her Juris Doctor (J.D.) in 1978. She worked as a legislative aide in the Massachusetts State Legislature, studied natural systems, and pursued her interest in sculpture and painting. She was admitted to the Massachusetts Bar in 1978. While raising her family, she practiced law, specializing in real and intellectual property. She worked, for part of that time, in patent law with Jerry Cohen, Esq.

Gibb sculpted the 12-inch bronze figurines of a pony-tailed girl running that were given as trophies to Joan Benoit Samuelson, Julie Brown, and Julie Isphording, the top three women marathoners at the US Olympic trials in 1984. Samuelson has commented on her trophy, stating: "There are only three in the world. It's irreplaceable."

== Media and honors ==
Gibb has written a memoir entitled Wind in the Fire: A Personal Journey and a book titled 26.2 Essays: An Inspiring New World View. As of 2015, a film based on her memoir and with the same title was in the works.

She has been included in Who's Who of American Women, Who's Who in America, and Who's Who in the World. In 1982 she was inducted into the Road Runners Club of America Long Distance Running Hall of Fame, and she has been interviewed for news programs and documentaries on ABC, CBS, NBC, ESPN, and HBO. She was included in the 1999 HBO Sports documentary Dare to Compete: The Struggle of Women in Sports. In 2000, she produced a documentary on her art and running entitled Where the Spirit Leads.

Gibb received the 2009 Tufts University Athletics Distinguished Achievement Award and was inducted into The Sports Museum of New England Hall of Fame in 2011. Her Special Achievement Award was presented by Joan Benoit Samuelson at the Sports Museum's 10th Annual "The Tradition" on June 28, 2011.

In 1996, at the 100th running of the Boston Marathon and the 30th anniversary of Gibb's first run of it, the Boston Athletic Association officially recognized her three wins in 1966, 1967, and 1968 and awarded her a medal. Her name was inscribed with the names of the other winners on the Boston Marathon Memorial in Copley Square.

In 2016, Gibb was the grand marshal of that year's Boston Marathon. That year's female winner, Atsede Baysa, gave Gibb her trophy; Gibb said that she would go to Baysa's native Ethiopia in 2017 and return it to her. As it turned out, Baysa came to Boston and Gibb returned the trophy to her at that time.

In 2021, a statue of Gibb called “The Girl Who Ran”, depicting her becoming the first woman to finish the Boston Marathon, was unveiled at the Hopkinton Center for the Arts. Gibb herself created the statue.

In April 2026, the statue was moved to the starting line of the Boston Marathon to commemorate the 60th anniversary of her first run.

== Art and writing ==
She pursues a career in art and writes on a wide range of topics including economics, spirituality, the nature of natural systems, and the phenomenon of subjective experience. Recently she joined the Cecil B. Day Neuromuscular Laboratory as an associate working to find the causes of and cures for neurodegenerative diseases, specifically amyotrophic lateral sclerosis.

== Personal life ==
In 1962, while hitchhiking, she met a middle-distance runner coming back from blueberry picking in Maine, a fellow classmate at Tufts named William Bingay, who would later enlist in the United States Navy and become her husband. They married on February 5, 1966, in California (later annulled).

She divides her time between San Diego and Boston.

== See also ==
- List of winners of the Boston Marathon
