= Kathrine Switzer =

German-born American runner (born 1947)

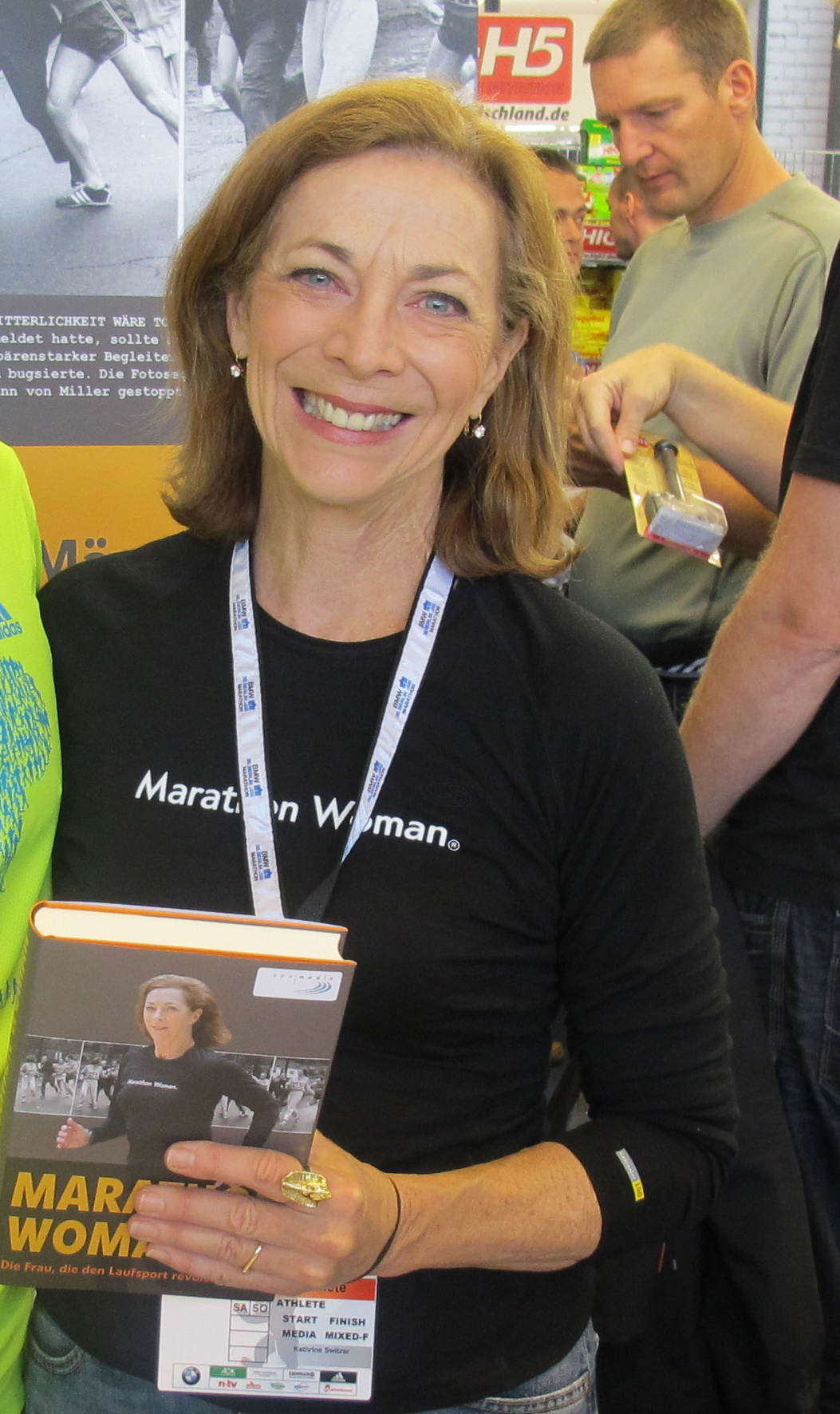
- Switzer at the 2011 Berlin Marathon expo

Personal information
- Full name: Kathrine Virginia Switzer
- Born: January 5, 1947 (age 79) Amberg, Germany
- Education: George C. Marshall High School; Syracuse University
- Occupations: Runner, author
- Spouses: Tom Miller (m. 1968; div. 1973) Philip Schaub (divorced) Roger Robinson (m. 1987)
- Website: kathrineswitzer.com

Kathrine Virginia Switzer (born January 5, 1947) is an American marathon runner, author, and television commentator.

In 1967, she became the first woman to run the Boston Marathon as an officially registered competitor, having entered as "K.V. Switzer". Switzer's trainer Arnie Briggs, and her boyfriend Thomas Miller, were also in the race. During her run, the race manager Jock Semple assaulted Switzer, trying to grab her bib number and thereby remove her from official competition. Semple knocked Briggs down when Briggs tried to protect her, but Semple was then shoved to the ground by Miller; she completed the race. The attack was photographed and reported internationally.

In response to her run, the AAU banned women from competing in races against men—women had not previously been explicitly excluded. Five years later, in 1972, women were first accepted officially to run the Boston Marathon. Switzer finished third in that 1972 race and Semple presented her with her trophy.

== Life and career ==
Switzer was born on January 5, 1947, in Amberg, American-occupied zone of Germany, the daughter of a major in the United States Army. Her family returned to the United States in 1949. She graduated from George C. Marshall High School in Fairfax County, Virginia, then attended Lynchburg College. She transferred to Syracuse University in 1967, where she studied journalism and English literature. She earned a bachelor's degree there in 1968 and a master's degree in 1972.

=== 1967 training ===
After transferring from Lynchburg to Syracuse, Switzer sought permission to train with the men's cross-country running program. Permission was granted, and cross-country assistant coach Arnie Briggs began training with her. Briggs insisted a marathon was too far for a "fragile woman" to run, but he conceded to Switzer: "If any woman could do it, you could, but you would have to prove it to me. If you ran the distance in practice, I’d be the first to take you to Boston." By the winter of 1967, Switzer was training for the upcoming Boston Marathon, tackling courses in Syracuse and on the roads between Syracuse and Cazenovia, New York, 20 miles away.

=== 1967 Boston Marathon ===
The rule book for the Boston Marathon made no mention of gender. The AAU, which governed the Marathon, declared that women could not compete in AAU-sanctioned races over a mile and a half.

This exclusion of women from a premier athletic event was already drawing high-profile challenges. In 1966, Bobbi Gibb had tried to enter the race officially but had been rejected by BAA Director Will Cloney who claimed women were physiologically incapable of running 26 miles. Gibb completed the 1966 race ahead of two-thirds of the runners with a time of 3:21:40, having entered the course near the starting pen in the middle of the pack. However, Gibb was not an official entrant.

Kathrine Switzer had decided she would run as an official competitor. Switzer registered using her assigned AAU number, and paid the full race fee. The required certificate of fitness and the application signature she provided were both submitted under the name 'K.V. Switzer.' Switzer later said she signed the application "as I always sign my name." She also stated that her name had been misspelled on her birth certificate, so she often used her initials to avoid confusion. She had a male runner collect her bib—number 261—before the race.

Switzer's father was supportive of his daughter's entry into the race, and on race day, other runners assembling for the start greeted her with support and enthusiasm, leading her to feel "very welcome". She ran among others from her running club, including coach Arnie Briggs and her boyfriend Tom Miller.

As Gibb had the year earlier, Switzer wore a hooded sweatshirt, but a few miles into the course, the hood slipped off and it became clear that a woman was running the Boston Marathon as an official entrant.

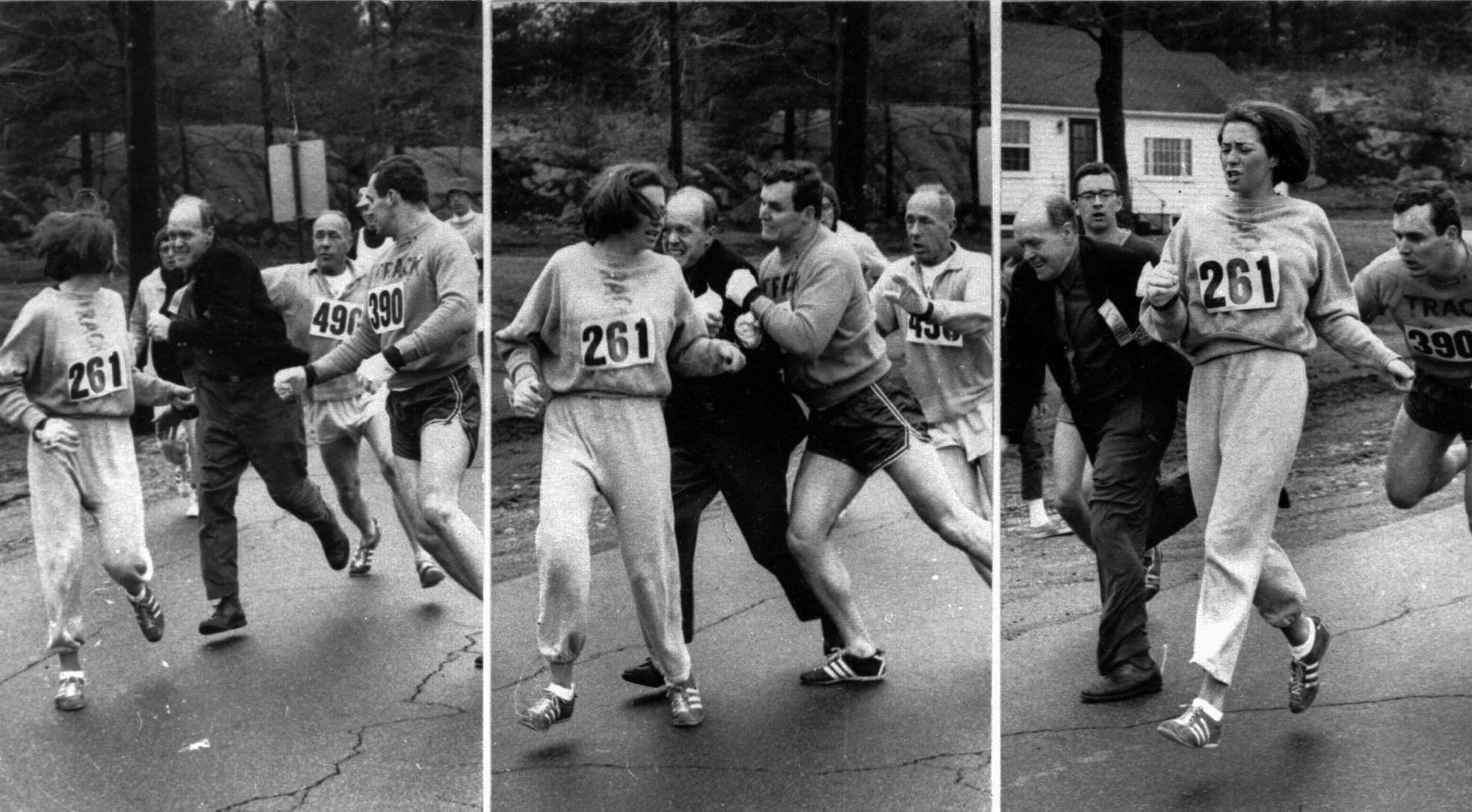
Switzer being assaulted by Jock Semple while running the Boston Marathon; taken by Harry A. Trask

At this point, according to a Sports Illustrated report, race co-director Jock Semple jumped off a following press truck and charged after Switzer. Semple did much of the actual organizing of the race, processed most of the applications, and wrangled the mob of runners to the start of the course on race day. He was also a strict traditionalist who considered the marathon to be "sacred", and was infamous for charging angrily after participants he found insufficiently serious about the race. In 1957, race officials had to dissuade local police from arresting him for attempted assault after he made a flying tackle at a racer running in webbed snorkeler's shoes and a grotesque mask because "the guy was runnin' with the good runners" at the 6.5 miles (10.5 km) mark. In the mid-1960s, he chased a contestant running in an Uncle Sam outfit, repeatedly dashing cups of water in the runner's face. To Semple, women competing were as out of line as the costume-wearing pranksters he attacked and decried as "weirdies."

Semple ran at Switzer and tried to rip her race number off to prevent her from continuing as an official competitor. In her memoir, she wrote:

Instinctively I jerked my head around quickly and looked square into the most vicious face I'd ever seen. A big man, a huge man, with bared teeth was set to pounce, and before I could react he grabbed my shoulder and flung me back, screaming, "Get the hell out of my race and give me those numbers!"

Semple's attack removed one of Switzer's gloves, but not her race number. When Switzer's slightly-built 50-year-old coach Arnie Briggs attempted to protect Switzer, Semple knocked him to the ground. Switzer's boyfriend, Tom Miller, who was running with her, then put his shoulder into Semple causing him to fall down. Semple complained in a 1968 interview about Miller's success in stopping his attacks, saying, "That guy's a hammer thrower, for cripes' sake!"

Switzer finished the marathon in approximately 4 hours and 20 minutes. Semple's attack was captured by photographers and the melee on the course made international headlines. The symbolism of Switzer's escape from Semple's attack far overshadowed the success of Bobbi Gibb, who completed the race for the second time and was the first woman to cross the 1967 finish line, with a time almost an hour faster than Switzer's. As she had in 1966, Gibb ran without a race number. She was not challenged during the race.

Semple later claimed that Switzer had been issued a number through an "oversight" in the entry screening process.

Boston Athletic Association director Will Cloney—who had rejected Bobbi Gibb's entry into the 1966 Boston Marathon giving as his reason his claim that women could not run that far—was asked his opinion of Switzer competing in the race. Although Gibb had completed the marathon the previous year with a good time, the race rule book made no mention of gender, and Switzer had a valid race registration, Cloney said: "Women can't run in the Marathon because the rules forbid it. Unless we have rules, society will be in chaos. I don't make the rules, but I try to carry them out. We have no space in the Marathon for any unauthorized person, even a man. If that girl were my daughter, I would spank her."

After Switzer's completion of the Boston Marathon as a registered entrant, the AAU changed its rules: it barred women from all competitions with male runners, with violators losing the right to compete in any race. Switzer, with other female runners, tried to convince the Boston Athletic Association to allow women to participate in the marathon. Finally, in 1972, the Boston Marathon established an official women's race.

According to Switzer, she understood the gravity of her participation and accomplishment:

I knew if I quit, nobody would ever believe that women had the capability to run 26-plus miles. If I quit, everybody would say it was a publicity stunt. If I quit, it would set women's sports back, way back, instead of forward. If I quit, I'd never run Boston. If I quit, Jock Semple and all those like him would win. My fear and humiliation turned to anger.

Switzer later softened her views on Semple; they became friends, and Switzer wrote:

I realized Jock Semple was just an over-worked race director protecting his event from people he thought were not serious about running. Sure, he was notorious for his bad temper. And, sure, he was a product of his time and thought women shouldn't be running marathons. But I wanted to prove him wrong on that point. Thus it was really Jock who gave me the inspiration to create more running opportunities for women. Almost every day of my life I thank him for attacking me, because he gave me this spark. Plus, he gave the world one of the most galvanizing photos in the women's rights movement. Sometimes the worst things in your life can become the best things.

=== Later competition, work, and honors ===
Switzer was the women's winner of the 1974 New York City Marathon, with a time of 3:07:29 (59th overall). Her personal best time is 2:51:37, at the 1975 Boston Marathon.

Switzer was named Female Runner of the Decade (1967–77) by Runner's World Magazine. She later became a sports reporter, writing articles and commenting on televised running events, eventually receiving an Emmy Award for her work. She created the Avon Running Global Women’s Circuit, a series of women's running events held in many countries, which led to a women’s marathon being included in the 1984 Olympic Games. In 1979, the Supersisters trading card set was produced and distributed; one of the cards featured Switzer's name and picture. She famously interviewed Boston Marathon fraudster Rosie Ruiz in 1980, asking her if her dramatic win and improvement in her time was due to running intervals, and Ruiz responded "I'm not sure what intervals are. What are they?".,

Switzer wrote Running and Walking for Women over 40 in 1997. She released her memoir, Marathon Woman, in April 2007, on the 40th anniversary of her first running of the Boston Marathon. In April 2008, Marathon Woman won the Billie Award for journalism for its portrayal of women in sports.

Switzer has said that when she attends the Boston Marathon, she is glad to see other female runners:

When I go to the Boston Marathon now, I have wet shoulders—women fall into my arms crying. They're weeping for joy because running has changed their lives. They feel they can do anything.

— Kathrine Switzer, The Nation (2013)

She was inducted into the National Women's Hall of Fame in 2011 for creating a social revolution by empowering women around the world through running. Since 1967, she has worked to improve running opportunities for women.

In 2015, Switzer launched a global non-profit called 261 Fearless with an ambassador program, club training system, and events. 261 Fearless uses running as a means to empower women to overcome life obstacles and embrace healthy living.

For the 2017 Boston Marathon—her ninth time running the race, and the 50th anniversary of her first time—she was assigned bib number 261, the same number she had been assigned in 1967. She was placed in wave 1 and corral 1 and finished in 4:44:31. She was leading a team of runners from 261 Fearless, and rather than being the only woman officially in the race like in 1967, she was joined by over 13,700 women—almost half of the total runners. That same year, the Boston Athletic Association announced it would not assign bib number 261 to any future runners, as an honor for Switzer.

Also in 2017, she ran the New York City Marathon for the first time since 1974; she finished in 4:48:21.

In May 2018, Switzer was the commencement speaker at the 164th commencement of Syracuse University, and received an honorary doctorate of humane letters degree.

In 2025, Switzer met Sophie Power, an ultrarunner pictured breastfeeding her three-month old son in the middle of the Ultra-Trail du Mont Blanc in 2018, at a running conference in the UK. Both women reflected on the impact on women's sport their two photographs had made.

== Personal life ==
In 1968, Switzer married Tom Miller, the man who had put an end to Semple's attack in 1967. They divorced in 1973. Switzer subsequently married and divorced public relations executive Philip Schaub. She then married British-born New Zealand runner and author Roger Robinson in 1987.

Switzer eventually made amends with Semple after he changed his mind with regard to women in sports. The two became close friends, and she last visited him shortly before Semple's death in 1988.

== Achievements ==
Year	Competition	Venue	Position	Notes
Representing the United States
1974	New York City Marathon	New York, United States	1st	3:07:29
1975	Boston Marathon	Boston, Massachusetts, United States	2nd	2:51:37

== See also ==
- Marie-Louise Ledru
- Arlene Pieper
- Violet Piercy
