= Sylvia Weiner =

Sylvia Weiner (born 1930) was the first woman to ever win the Boston Marathon’s women's masters division, which she did in 1975, at age 44 with a time of 3:21:38.

She is a Holocaust survivor, born in Poland, taken from her family at age twelve in 1942 and sent to three concentration camps during the next two years. She went to Majdanek, Auschwitz, and then Bergen-Belsen. In Bergen-Belsen she befriended Anne Frank, and was with her on the day that she died.

She was living in Montreal when she joined a YMHA because membership was required to enroll her daughter in the YMHA's nursery school. There she took a fitness course which became a running class. Later she joined a small, otherwise-all-male running group called the Wolf Pack after its leader, Wolf Bronet, who was also a Holocaust survivor. She ran the Boston Marathon for the first time in 1974, with a time of 3:47. Her best marathon time was a 3:15 at the Skylon Marathon in Buffalo in 1976. At the Advil Mini Marathon 10K in Central Park, she won her age group one year, and finished second in the mother-daughter division with her daughter Debbie; in 2014 she won her division in the Leaf Peepers 5K in Waterbury, Vermont, in 48:36.
