= Boston Athletic Association =

Athletic non-profit based in Boston

- Official Logo of the Boston Athletic Association
- Formation: 15 March 1887
- Founder: Robert F. Clark
- Legal status: 501(c)(3) nonprofit
- Headquarters: 699 Boylston Street, Boston, MA 02116
- Location: Boston, Massachusetts
- President and CEO: Jack Fleming
- Website: www.baa.org

The Boston Athletic Association (B.A.A.) is a non-profit dedicated to organized sports, with a focus on running, in the Greater Boston area. The B.A.A. hosts such events as the Boston Marathon, the B.A.A. 5K, the B.A.A. 10K, the B.A.A. Half Marathon, the B.A.A. Distance Medley (comprising the 5k, 10K, and half marathon events), and the B.A.A. Invitational Mile.

The current mission of the B.A.A. is "to promote a healthy lifestyle through sports, especially running" for all people.

== History ==
=== Early years ===
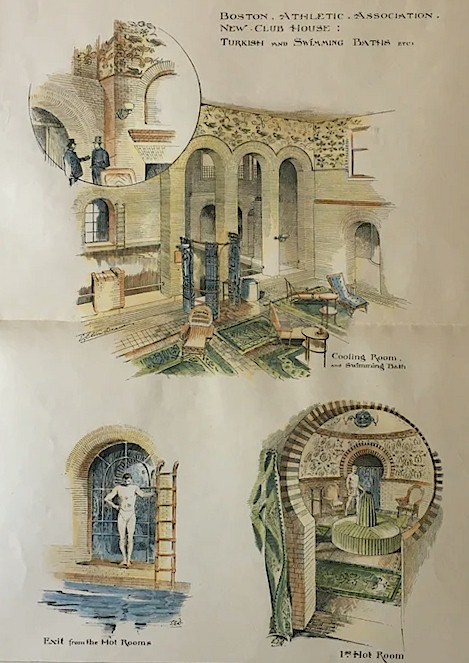
The Victorian Turkish baths and plunge pool at the B.A.A., 1889

The Boston Athletic Association, one of the nation's oldest athletic clubs, held its first official meeting on March 15, 1887, and was incorporated later that year on May 12. The club was founded through the collaborative efforts of an eclectic group of former Civil War officers such as its first president, Robert F. Clark; the Irish poet, activist, and editor John Boyle O'Reilly; other noted sportsmen in Boston; members of prominent, wealthy Boston families, such as George Walker Weld; and entrepreneurs and politicians of the day.

According to its 1887 charter, the B.A.A.'s purpose was to "encourage all manly sports and promote physical culture." The organization was based in an opulent clubhouse, which opened in December 1888 and was located on the corner of Exeter and Boylston Streets in Boston's Back Bay at the present-day site of the Boston Public Library. The athletic club provided extensive amenities for its due-paying members. Its first floor, called the "Social Floor," focused on the social aspects of membership. This first floor included a large dining hall, a library, a billiard room, a wine room, and two drawing rooms. The second and third floors focused on sports and training, including a gymnasium, tennis and racquet courts, and a running track. The basement mezzanine had bowling alleys and a barber shop. The club's basement contained a 60,000-gallon "swimming tank" for aquatic sports, and a Victorian Turkish baths suite comprising two hot rooms, a shampooing room and shower, together with a complementary Russian (steam) room.

B.A.A. worked quickly to organize competitive sports for young men, establishing programs in ten sports before 1900: football, baseball, cricket, "fives," rowing, boxing, fencing, water polo, squash, and track and field. In 1890, it hosted 27 competitions and exhibitions, including fencing, swim meets, bicycle races, and cross-country runs, and chose the unicorn as its symbol. That year, B.A.A. also entered 80 athletes in track and field competitions; over fifty percent finished in the top three, with seventeen taking first place, nineteen in second place, and eight in third place. In 1896, a small B.A.A. team comprised most of the U.S. delegation who participated in the first modern Olympic Games in Athens, Greece. The Association's athletes excelled at the Olympics, winning six of the 11 gold medals in track and field awarded to the U.S. team and two first-place medals in the shooting events. Inspired by the Olympic marathon, the B.A.A. team sought to establish a similar long-distance race in the United States. Consequently, the inaugural B.A.A. Boston Marathon was held in April 1897. The Association's unicorn symbol became associated with the Boston Marathon and appears on its medals to this day.

The Boston Athletic Association ice hockey team won the American Amateur Hockey League championship in 1916 and 1917 and the United States Amateur Hockey Association championship in the 1923 season.

=== The Great Depression ===
In the late 1880s, the B.A.A. sold thirty-year bonds totaling $154,000 to finance the construction of its club building. When the bonds matured in 1918, during World War I, the repayment deadline was extended to 1932, which coincided with the Great Depression. Although the Association had established a reserve fund to cover the bond repayments, the organization's assets were depleted in the 1930s by the stock market crash, the subsequent Great Depression, and possible embezzlement by an employee. Unable to cover its financial obligations and grappling with a deficit, the B.A.A. defaulted on its bonds and filed a petition of reorganization under Section 77B of the Bankruptcy Act of 1898.

The B.A.A. lost nearly 1,000 of its 1,600 members during the Great Depression. After filing for bankruptcy, the Association closed its clubhouse on August 4, 1935, and sold its building's furnishings at auction later that year. The building was purchased by Boston University (BU). The school planned to turn the clubhouse, renamed the Soden Building, into a modern gymnasium, but a city ordinance prevented BU from building a hall with a capacity of over 300 people in this type of building. It was instead remodeled and housed classrooms. The building continued to be the headquarters of the Boston Marathon for two decades and was torn down in 1959.

=== Boston Garden ===
After the organization's clubhouse closed, a small group of determined B.A.A. supporters, including George V. Brown, his eldest son Walter A. Brown, William F. Garcelon (president of the B.A.A.), and Clarence A. Barnes (president of a newly formed Unicorn Club), came to its aid. The B.A.A. Governing Board continued to meet in a suite of rooms at Boston's Hotel Lenox. In addition, a fraction of Association members had formed the Unicorn Club to continue the Boston Athletic Association Indoor Games and the Boston Marathon. These two groups collaborated to save the diminished B.A.A. At a Unicorn Club meeting on January 3, 1936, Gracelon and Barnes presided as the club voted to merge with the old B.A.A. and reorganize a new Boston Athletic Association. Barnes was elected president of the revived B.A.A. George V. Burns, a member of the Association's Governing Board and the manager of the Boston Garden, allowed the indoor games to be held at the Garden free of charge.

Walter A. Brown was elected president of the Boston Athletic Association in 1940 and continued until his death in 1964. During this time, the B.A.A. was a commercial enterprise of the Boston Garden, which hosted its annual indoor meet. For many years, the Boston Athletic Association Indoor Games, not the Boston Marathon, was the Association's premier event. It attracted top athletes, including Cornelius Warmerdam, Wes Santee, and Ron Delany. However, as the years went on, attendance declined (dropping from 13,645 in 1960 to 9,008 in 1971) and overhead costs increased, making the indoor games unprofitable. In 1971, the decision was made to end the B.A.A. meet.

In 1951, during the height of the Korean War, Brown denied three Korean runners entry into the Boston Marathon. He stated: "While American soldiers are fighting and dying in Korea, every Korean should be fighting to protect his country instead of training for marathons. As long as the war continues there, we positively will not accept Korean entries for our race on April 19." The Association reversed this ban on Korean runners the following year.

Brown was succeeded by Will Cloney, who was president from 1964 to 1982.

=== B.A.A.'s gender barriers ===
Historically centered on "manly" sports, the Boston Athletic Association did not allow women to register for the Boston Marathon until 1972. However, a few months before the 1966 marathon, Roberta "Bobbi" Gibb applied to run in the race. The B.A.A. rejected her application with a letter from Cloney where he stated,

Dear Mrs. Burgay,

We have received your request for an application for the Boston Marathon and regret that we will not be able to send you an application.

Women are not physiologically capable of running a marathon and we would not want to take the medical liability. Furthermore, the Boston Marathon is a men's division event. The rules of International Sports and the Amateur Athletic Union, do not allow women to run races more than the sanctioned one and a half miles.

Sorry, we could not be of more help.

Sincerely,

Will Cloney

Regardless, in 1966, Gibb became the first woman to run the Boston Marathon. She ran the race without registering and finished faster than two-thirds of the male competitors. Gibb also ran the marathon unofficially in 1967 and 1968, each year finishing first in the unsanctioned women's field. In 1967, Kathrine Switzer also ran the Boston Marathon, registering under the name "K. V. Switzer." She was assigned bib number 261 and assumed to be male, although she did not claim that. Two miles into the race, Switzer was momentarily stopped by race co-director Jock Semple, who unsuccessfully tried to remove her race number. The confrontation between Switzer and Semple was memorialized in photographs. And like Gibb, Switzer completed the race as an unsanctioned runner. Five women completed the Boston Marathon the following year despite being unable to register for the race.

It wasn't until 1972, after the Amateur Athletic Union approved women marathoners, that the B.A.A. also changed its rules to allow women to compete officially. Eight women registered and completed the race, with Nina Kuscsik placing first in the inaugural women's field. In 1984, Marja Bakker became the first female member of the B.A.A.'s Board of Governors (BOG), while Joann Flaminio became the Association's first female president in 2011. Marathoner Adrienne R. Benton was appointed to the B.A.A. BOG in November 2021, becoming the first woman of color to serve in that role.

=== Current organization ===
With the Boston Garden no longer involved with the B.A.A, a new board of directors was formed in 1977. The B.A.A.'s current headquarters is at 185 Dartmouth Street. In 1986, John Hancock Mutual Life Insurance Company assumed major sponsorship of the Boston Marathon, an affiliation that helped not just the marathon but also its year-round community programming. John Hancock continued to sponsor the marathon for 38 years until 2023, when the company chose not to renew the contract, allowing it to expire.

The B.A.A. maintains an active running club, organizes the B.A.A. 5K on the weekend of the Boston Marathon, the B.A.A. 10K in June, the B.A.A. Half Marathon in October, and the Mayor's Cup cross country races in Franklin Park in October. The B.A.A. successfully bid to host the 2008 U.S. Olympic Trials Women's Marathon, which was run on the Sunday before the 112th Boston Marathon in 2008.

In January 2016, the B.A.A. purchased an office building yards from the starting line of the Boston Marathon in Hopkinton, Massachusetts, to serve the association for the runner registration and services for various B.A.A. events.

In March 2023, Bank of America (BOA) took over sponsorship of the Boston Marathon, replacing John Hancock. BOA will also sponsor other B.A.A. races, including the 5K, 10K, and half marathon.

== Youth races ==
The B.A.A. organizes an annual relay race for Boston-area middle school and high-school-aged runners that takes place on Clarendon Street in Boston.

== See also ==
- Boston Marathon
