= Boston Marathon =

World's oldest regularly run marathon

- Current logo, introduced in June 2024
- Date: Usually the third Monday of April (Patriots' Day)
- Location: Eastern Massachusetts, ending in Boston
- Event type: Road
- Distance: Marathon
- Established: 1897 (129 years ago)
- Course records: Men: 2:01:52 (2026); John Korir; Women: 2:17:22 (2025); Sharon Lokedi
- Website: www.baa.org/races/boston-marathon
- 2026 Boston Marathon

The Boston Marathon is an annual marathon race hosted by eight cities and towns in greater Boston in eastern Massachusetts, United States. It is traditionally held on Patriots' Day, the third Monday of April. First held in 1897, the event was inspired by the success of the first marathon competition in the 1896 Summer Olympics. The Boston Marathon is the world's oldest annual marathon and ranks as one of the world's best-known road racing events. It is one of eight World Marathon Majors. Its course runs from Hopkinton in southern Middlesex County to Boylston Street, near Copley Square, in Boston. The World Marathon Majors is a series that includes the Sydney, Tokyo, Cape Town, Boston, London, Berlin, Chicago, and New York City marathons. Points from these races determine annual series champions among elite competitors, enhancing international competition and prestige.

The Boston Athletic Association (B.A.A.) has organized this event annually since 1897, including a "virtual alternative" after the 2020 road race was canceled due to the COVID-19 pandemic. The race has been managed by DMSE Sports since 1988. Amateur and professional runners from all over the world compete in the Boston Marathon each year, braving the hilly Massachusetts terrain and varying weather to take part in the race.

The event attracts 500,000+ spectators along the route, making it New England's most viewed sporting event. Recent editions have seen strong participation; for example, the Centennial Boston Marathon in 1996 established a record as the world's largest marathon with 38,708 entrants, 36,748 starters, and 35,868 finishers.

== History ==
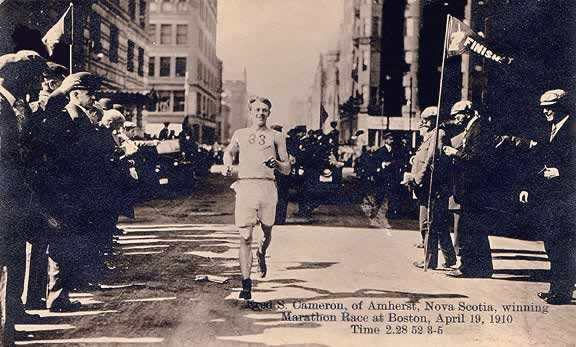
Boston Marathon Finish Line, 1910.

Men have competed in the event since its inaugural edition in 1897. Women were officially allowed to enter the event starting in 1972, although organizers now recognize 1966 as the first edition officially completed by a woman. Wheelchair divisions were added in 1975 for men and in 1977 for women. The first person to officially race the marathon in a wheelchair was Bob Hall. Handcycle divisions were added in 2017 for both men and women.

The Boston Marathon was first run in April 1897, inspired by the revival of the marathon for the 1896 Summer Olympics in Athens, Greece. It is the oldest continuously running marathon (though the 1918 version consisted of a military relay, and the 2020 version was a virtual experience). It is also the third longest continuously running footrace in North America, having debuted five months after the five mile Buffalo Turkey Trot race.

On April 19, 1897, ten years after the establishment of the B.A.A., the race was inspired by the marathon event at the 1896 Summer Olympics. Organizers evaluated several possible routes before selecting a 24.5-mile course from Metcalf's Mill in Ashland to the Irvington Oval in Boston. The inaugural race was open to any competitor over 18, and John J. McDermott won in 2:55:10, leading a field of 15. The event was scheduled for the recently established holiday of Patriots' Day, with the race linking the Athenian and American struggles for liberty. The race, which became known as the Boston Marathon, has been held in some form every year since then, even during the World War years and the Great Depression, making it the world's oldest annual marathon. In 1924, the starting line was moved from Metcalf's Mill in Ashland to the neighboring town of Hopkinton. The course was adjusted gradually after the 1908 Olympic standards established 26 miles 385 yards as the official distance. Boston's course requirements changed with this, as runners were required to complete a standard International Association of Athletics Federation (IAAF) certified marathon.

The Boston Marathon was originally a local event, but its fame and status have attracted runners from all over the world. For most of its history, the Boston Marathon was a free event, and the only prize awarded for winning the race was a wreath woven from olive branches. Corporate-sponsored prize money was awarded in the 1980s after professional athletes refused to compete without it. The marathon awarded the first cash prize in 1986.

Walter A. Brown was the president of the Boston Athletic Association from 1941 to 1964. During the height of the Korean War in 1951, Brown denied Koreans entry into the Boston Marathon. He stated: "While American soldiers are fighting and dying in Korea, every Korean should be fighting to protect his country instead of training for marathons. As long as the war continues there, we positively will not accept Korean entries for our race on April 19."

Following the 2013 bombing, the Boston Marathon instituted enhanced security screening, expanded medical response capabilities, and improved crowd-management plans.

=== Bobbi Gibb, Kathrine Switzer, and Nina Kuscik ===
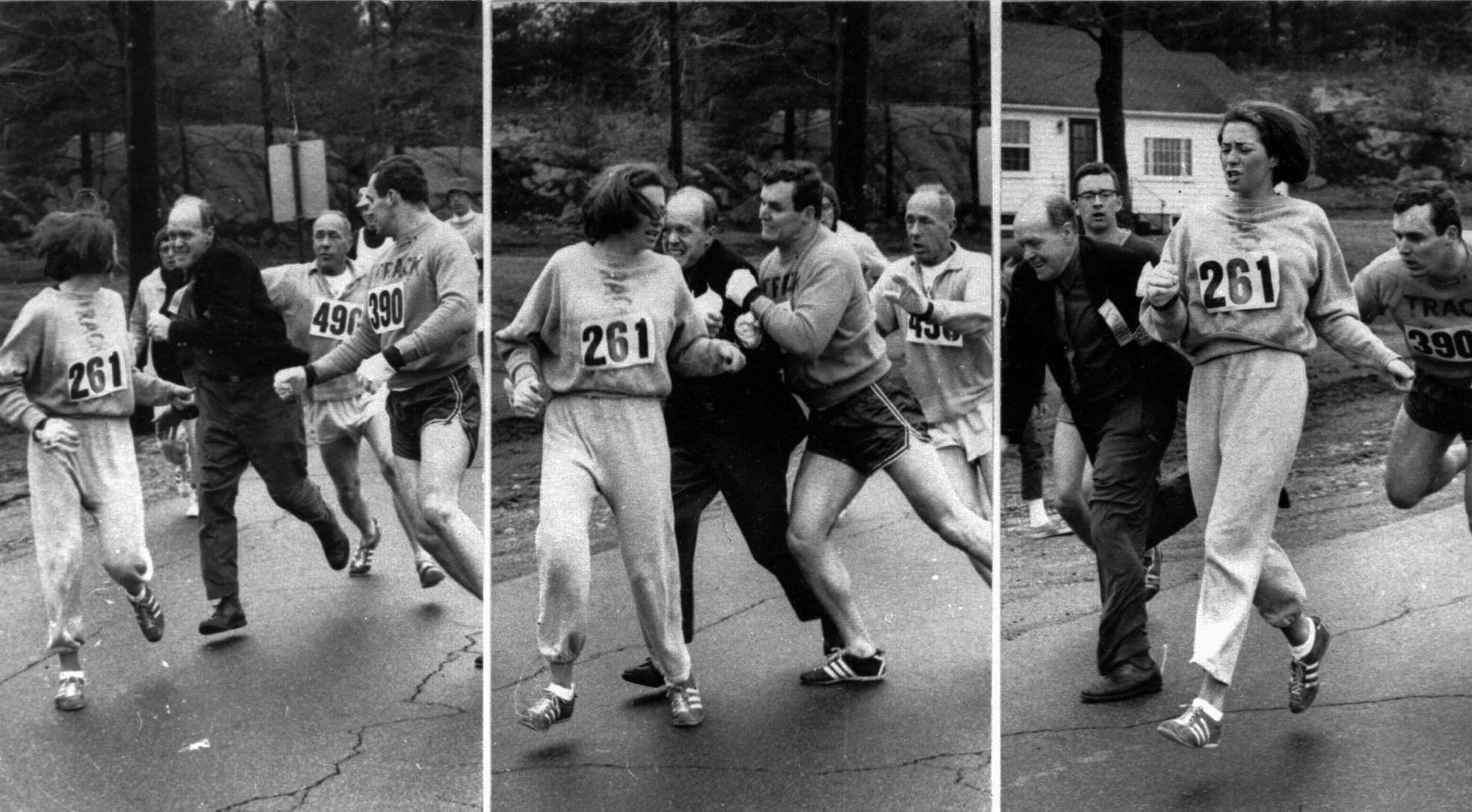
Runner Kathrine Switzer attacked by race official Jock Semple in effort to protect the race from "Contamination Rules" which prevented women from officially entering the marathon

The Boston Marathon rule book made no mention of gender until after the 1967 race. Nor did the Amateur Athletic Union (AAU) exclude women from races that included men until after the 1967 Boston Marathon. Roberta "Bobbi" Gibb's attempt to register for the 1966 race was refused by race director Will Cloney in a letter in which he claimed women were physiologically incapable of running 26 miles. Gibb nevertheless ran unregistered and finished the 1966 race in three hours, twenty-one minutes and forty seconds, ahead of two-thirds of the runners. Much later, she would be recognized by the race organizers as the first woman to run the entire Boston Marathon.

In 1967, Kathrine Switzer, who registered for the race using her official AAU registration number, paying the entry fee, providing a properly acquired fitness certificate, and signing her entry form with her usual signature 'K. V. Switzer', was the first woman to run and finish with a valid official race registration. As a result of Switzer's completion of the race as the first officially registered woman runner, the AAU changed its rules to ban women from competing in races against men. Switzer finished the race despite race official Jock Semple repeatedly assaulting her in an attempt to rip off her race numbers and eject her from the race. Afterwards, Semple and Switzer became friends.

Nina Kuscsik was instrumental in influencing the Amateur Athletic Union in 1971 to increase its maximum distance for sanctioned women's races, leading to official participation by women in marathons, beginning at Boston in 1972. Kuscsik was the first woman to officially win the Boston Marathon, which occurred in 1972.

In 1996, the B.A.A. retroactively recognized as champions the unofficial women's leaders of 1966 through 1971. In 2022, about 43 percent of the entrants were women.

=== Rosie Ruiz, the impostor ===
In 1980, Rosie Ruiz crossed the finish line first in the women's race. However, marathon officials became suspicious, and it was discovered that she did not appear in race videotapes until near the end of the race, with a subsequent investigation concluding that she had skipped most of the race and blended into the crowd about a half-mile (800 m) from the finish line, where she then ran to her false victory. She was disqualified eight days later, and Canadian Jacqueline Gareau was proclaimed the winner.

=== Participant deaths ===
In 1905, James Edward Brooks of North Adams, Massachusetts, died of pneumonia shortly after running the marathon. In 1996, a 61-year-old Swedish man, Humphrey Siesage, died of a heart attack during the 100th running. In 2002, Cynthia Lucero, 28, died of hyponatremia.

=== 2011: Geoffrey Mutai and the IAAF ===
On April 18, 2011, Geoffrey Mutai of Kenya won the 2011 Boston Marathon in a time of 2:03:02:00. Although this was the fastest marathon ever run at the time, the International Association of Athletics Federations noted that the performance was not eligible for world record status given that the course did not satisfy rules that regarded elevation drop and start/finish separation (the latter requirement being intended to prevent advantages gained from a strong tailwind, as was the case in 2011). The Associated Press (AP) reported that Mutai had the support of other runners who describe the IAAF's rules as "flawed". According to the Boston Herald, race director Dave McGillivray said he was sending paperwork to the IAAF to have Mutai's mark ratified as a world record. Although this was not successful, the AP indicated that the attempt to have the mark certified as a world record "would force the governing bodies to reject an unprecedented performance on the world's most prestigious marathon course".

=== 2013: Bombing ===
On April 15, 2013, the Boston Marathon was still in progress at 2:49 p.m. EDT (nearly three hours after the winner crossed the finish line), when two homemade bombs were set off about 200 yards (180 m) apart on Boylston Street, in approximately the last 225 yards (200 m) of the course. The race was halted, preventing many from finishing. Three spectators were killed and an estimated 264 people were injured. Entrants who completed at least half the course and did not finish due to the bombing were given automatic entry in 2014. In 2015, Dzhokhar Tsarnaev, one of the perpetrators of the bombing, was found guilty of 30 federal offenses in connection with the attack and was sentenced to death. His older brother Tamerlan died after a gunfight with police and after Dzhokhar ran him over with a stolen vehicle.

=== 2014: Women's race disqualification ===
Bizunesh Deba of Ethiopia was eventually named women's winner of the 2014 Boston Marathon, following the disqualification of Kenyan Rita Jeptoo from the event due to confirmed doping. Deba finished in a time of 2:19:59, and became the course record holder. Her performance bested that of Margaret Okayo, who ran a time of 2:20:43 in 2002.

=== 2016: Bobbi Gibb as grand marshal ===
In the 2016 Boston Marathon, Jami Marseilles, an American, became the first female double amputee to finish the Boston Marathon. Bobbi Gibb, the first woman to have run the entire Boston Marathon (1966), was the grand marshal of the race. The Women's Open division winner, Atsede Baysa, gave Gibb her trophy; Gibb said that she would go to Baysa's native Ethiopia in 2017 and return it to her.

=== 2020: Cancellation ===
Due to the COVID-19 pandemic, the 2020 Boston Marathon was initially rescheduled from April 20 to September 14. It was the first postponement in the more than 100-year uninterrupted history of the event.

On May 28, 2020, it was announced that the rescheduled marathon set for September 14 was canceled. Boston Mayor Marty Walsh said of the decision to cancel the race, "There's no way to hold this usual race format without bringing large numbers of people into close proximity. While our goal and our hope was to make progress in containing the virus and recovering our economy, this kind of event would not be responsible or realistic on September 14 or any time this year."

Runners were issued full refunds of entry fees. Organizers later staged a "virtual alternative" in September 2020 as the 124th running of the marathon. This was the second time the marathon's format was modified, the first having been in 1918, when the race was changed from a marathon to a military relay race (ekiden) because of World War I.

=== 2021: Rescheduled to October ===
On October 28, 2020, the B.A.A. announced that the 2021 edition of the marathon would not be held in April; organizers stated that they hoped to stage the event later in the year, possibly in the autumn. In late January 2021, organizers announced October 11 as the date for the marathon, contingent upon road races being allowed in Massachusetts at that time. In March, organizers announced that the field would be limited to 20,000 runners. The race was the fourth of the five World Marathon Majors held in 2021; all events in the series were run within six weeks between late September and early November. In 2021, the B.A.A. also offered a virtual alternative to the in-person race to be completed anytime between 8–10 October.

== Race ==
=== Qualifying ===
Boston Marathon qualifying standards (effective for 2026 race)
Age	Men	Women
18–34	2 h 55 min	3 h 25 min
35–39	3 h 00 min	3 h 30 min
40–44	3 h 05 min	3 h 35 min
45–49	3 h 15 min	3 h 45 min
50–54	3 h 20 min	3 h 50 min
55–59	3 h 30 min	4 h 00 min
60–64	3 h 50 min	4 h 20 min
65–69	4 h 05 min	4 h 35 min
70–74	4 h 20 min	4 h 50 min
75–79	4 h 35 min	5 h 05 min
≥80	4 h 50 min	5 h 20 min

The Boston Marathon is open to runners 18 or older from any nation, but they must meet certain qualifying standards. To qualify, a runner must first complete a standard marathon course certified by a national governing body affiliated with the World Athletics within a certain period of time before the date of the desired Boston Marathon (usually within approximately 18 months prior).

In the 1980s and 1990s, membership in USA Track & Field was required of all runners, but this requirement has been eliminated.

Qualifying standards for the 2013 race were tightened on February 15, 2011, by five minutes in each age-gender group for marathons run after September 23, 2011. Prospective runners aged 18–34 must run a time of no more than 3:00:00 (3 hours) if male, or 3:30:00 (3 hours 30 minutes) if female; the qualifying time is adjusted upward as age increases. In addition, the 59-second grace period on qualifying times has been eliminated; for example, a 40- to 44-year-old male will no longer qualify with a time of 3:10:01. For many marathoners, to qualify for Boston (to "BQ") is a goal and achievement in itself. This leads many runners to find intrinsic motivation in qualifying for the elusive marathon by setting the specific, time-based, and difficult goals associated with the age-based time standard.

An exception to the qualification times is for runners who receive entries from partners. About one-fifth of the marathon's spots are reserved each year for charities, sponsors, vendors, licensees, consultants, municipal officials, local running clubs, and marketers. In 2010, about 5,470 additional runners received entries through partners, including 2,515 charity runners. The marathon currently allocates spots to two dozen charities who in turn are expected to raise more than $10 million a year. In 2017, charity runners raised $34.2 million for more than 200 non-profit organizations. The Boston Athletic Association's Official Charity Program raised $17.96 million, John Hancock's Non-Profit Program raised $12.3 million, and the last $3.97 million was raised by other qualified and invitational runners.

On October 18, 2010, the 20,000 spots reserved for qualifiers were filled in a record-setting eight hours and three minutes. The speed of registration prompted the B.A.A. to change its qualifying standards for the 2013 marathon onward. In addition to lowering qualifying times, the change includes a rolling application process, which gives faster runners priority. Organizers decided not to significantly adjust the number of non-qualifiers.

On September 27, 2018, the B.A.A. announced that they were lowering the qualifying times for the 2020 marathon by another five minutes, with male runners in the 18-34 age group required to run a time of 3:00:00 (3 hours) or less and female runners in the 18-34 age group required to run a time of 3:30:00 (3 hours, 30 minutes) or less in order to qualify.

In September 2024, the B.A.A. announced new qualifying times for the 2026 race, lowering the former qualifying times by five minutes again for most age groups. The 18-34 age group needs to run a time of 2:55 (two hours, 55 minutes) for males, and 3:25 (3 hours, 25 minutes) for female and non-binary runners to qualify for the 2026 race.

Starting with registration for the 2027 race, the B.A.A introduced a "downhill penalty" index that adjusts qualifying times achieved on steep net-downhill courses. For courses with a net elevation drop between 1,500 to 2,999 feet incur a five-minute penalty, while courses with a net drop of between 3,000 to 5,999 are assessed a 10-minute penalty. Courses with a net descent of 6,000 feet (1,800 m) or more are entirely disallowed.

=== Race day ===
The race has traditionally been held on Patriots' Day, a state holiday in Massachusetts. Through 1968, the holiday was observed on April 19, with the event held that day, unless it fell on a Sunday, in which case the race was held on Monday. Since 1969, the holiday has been observed on the third Monday in April, with the event held then, often referred to locally as "Marathon Monday".

=== Starting times ===
Through 2005, the race began at noon (wheelchair race at 11:25 a.m., and elite women at 11:31 a.m.), at the official starting point in Hopkinton, Massachusetts. In 2006, the race used a staggered "wave start", where top-seeded runners (the elite men's group) and a first batch of up to 10,000 runners started at noon, with a second group starting at 12:30. The next year the starting times for the race were moved up, allowing runners to take advantage of cooler temperatures and enabling the roads to be reopened earlier. The marathon later added third and fourth waves to help further stagger the runners and reduce congestion.

The starting times for 2019 were:

- Men's Push Rim Wheelchair: 9:02 a.m.
- Women's Push Rim Wheelchair: 9:04 a.m.
- Handcycles and Duos: 9:25 a.m.
- Elite Women: 9:32 a.m.
- Elite Men: 10 a.m.
- Wave One: 10:02 a.m.
- Wave Two: 10:25 a.m.
- Wave Three: 10:50 a.m.
- Wave Four: 11:15 a.m.

=== Course ===
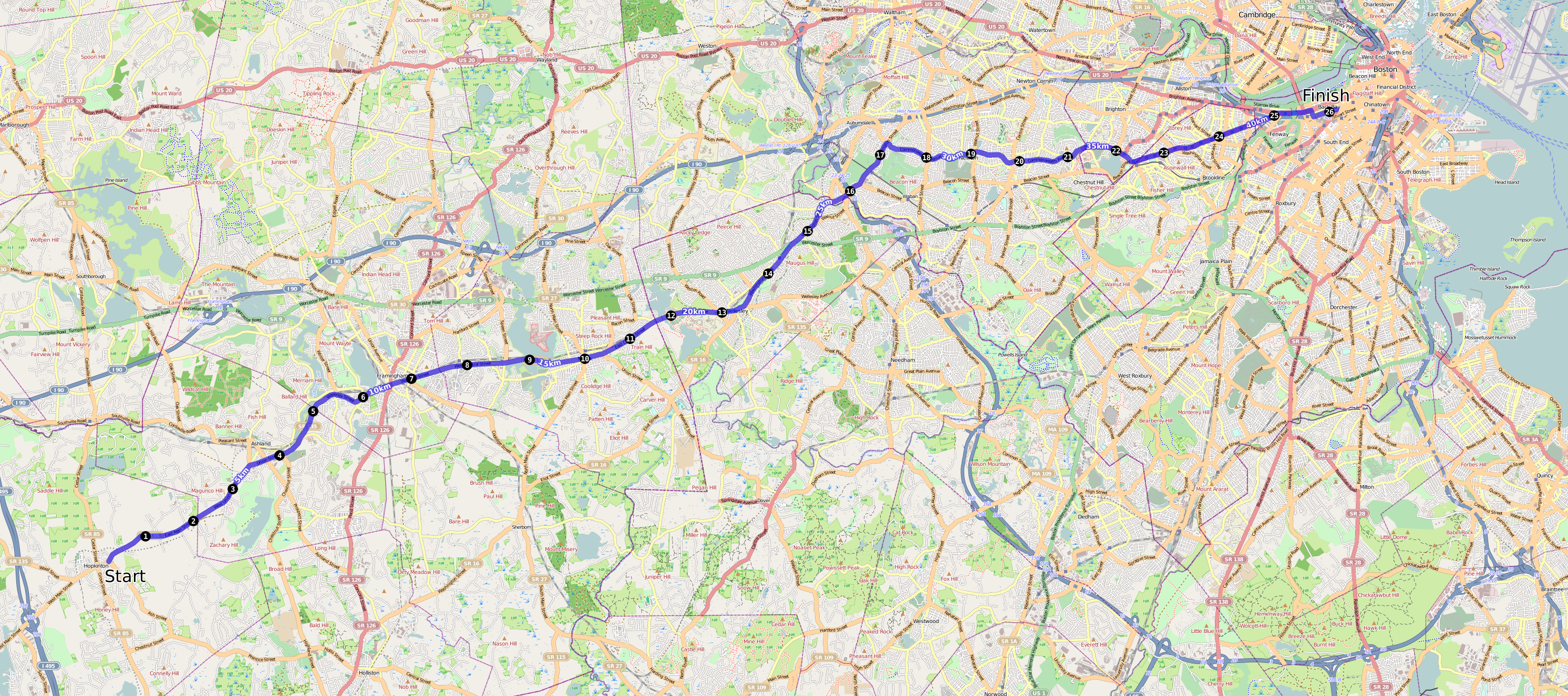
Course map

The course runs through 26 miles 385 yards (42.195 km) of winding roads, following Route 135, Route 16, Route 30 and city streets into the center of Boston, where the official finish line is located at Copley Square, alongside the Boston Public Library. The race runs through eight Massachusetts cities and towns: Hopkinton, Ashland, Framingham, Natick, Wellesley, Newton, Brookline, and Boston. The first six miles of the course descend through Ashland and Framingham. Runners encounter a series of four Newton hills, culminating in Heartbreak Hill just after mile 20, before the final downhill and flat approach into Boston.

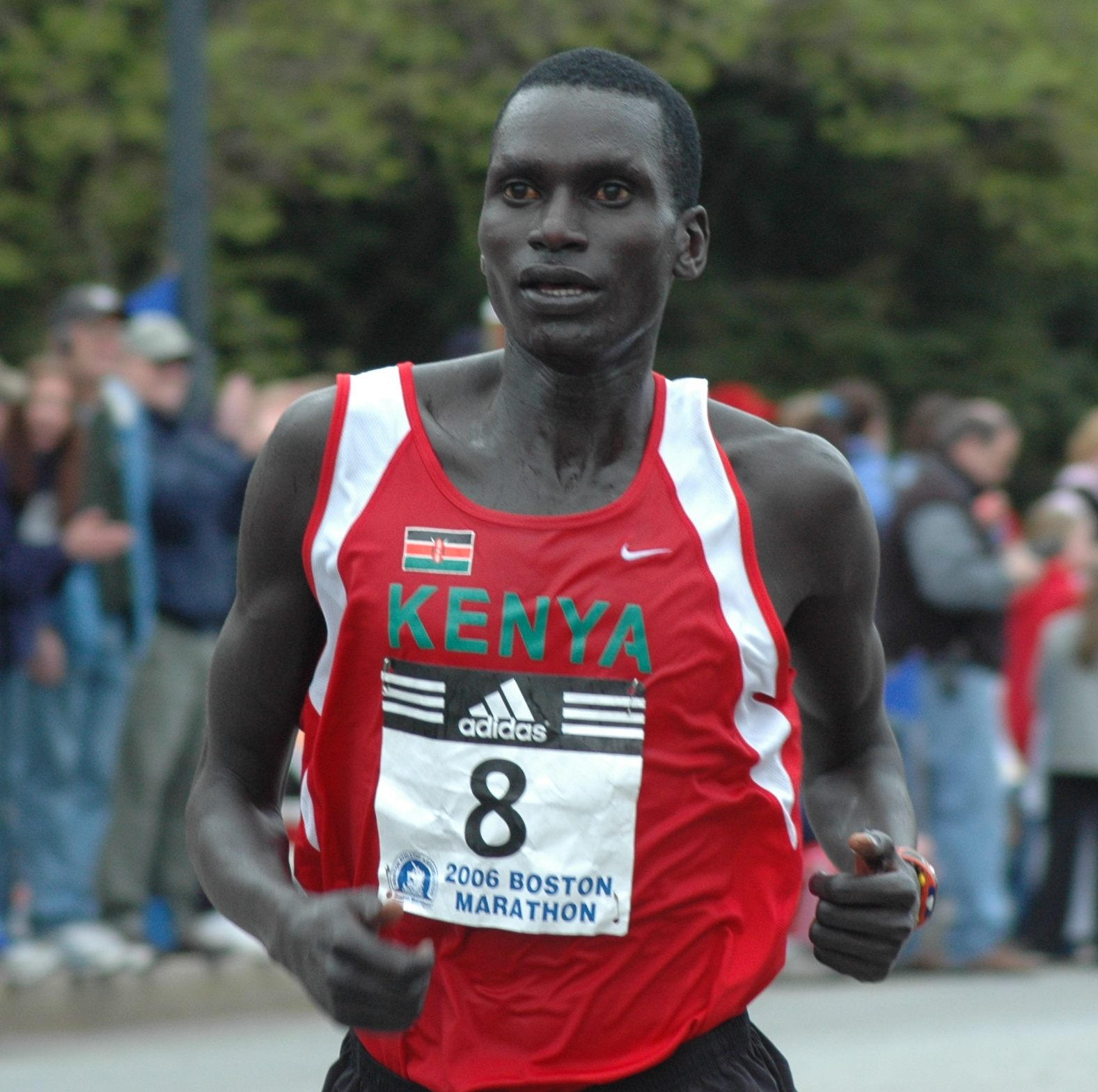
Robert Kipkoech Cheruiyot on his way to winning the 2006 Boston Marathon, where he set a new course record.

The Boston Marathon is considered one of the most difficult marathon courses because of the Newton hills, which culminate in Heartbreak Hill near Boston College. While the three hills on Commonwealth Avenue (Route 30) are better known, a preceding hill on Washington Street (Route 16), climbing from the Charles River crossing at 16 miles (26 km), is regarded by Dave McGillivray, the long-term race director, as the course's most difficult challenge. This hill, which follows a 150-foot (46 m) rise over a 1/2 mile (800 m) stretch, forces many lesser-trained runners to a walking pace.

==== Heartbreak Hill ====
Heartbreak Hill is an ascent over 0.4 miles (600 m) between the 20- and 21-mile (32- and 34-km) marks, near Boston College. It is the last of four "Newton hills", which begin at the 16-mile (26 km) mark and challenge contestants with late (if modest) climbs after the course's general downhill trend to that point. Though Heartbreak Hill itself rises only 88 feet (27 m) vertically (from an elevation of 148 to 236 feet (45 to 72 m)), it comes in the portion of a marathon distance where muscle glycogen stores are most likely to be depleted—a phenomenon referred to by marathoners as "hitting the wall".

It was on this hill that, in 1936, defending champion John A. "Johnny" Kelley overtook Ellison "Tarzan" Brown, giving him a consolatory pat on the shoulder as he passed. This gesture renewed the competitive drive in Brown, who rallied, pulled ahead of Kelley, and went on to win—thereby, it was said, breaking Kelley's heart.

=== Records ===
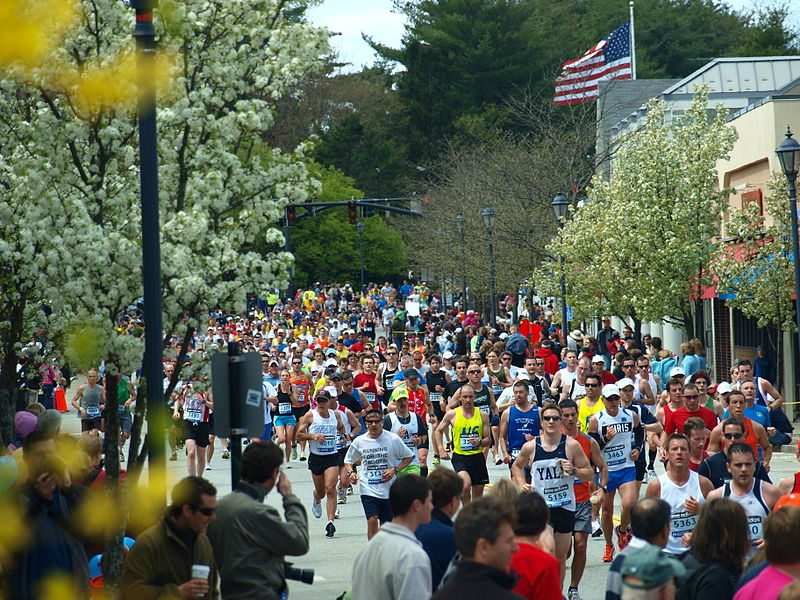
Participants in the 2010 Boston Marathon in Wellesley, just after the halfway mark

Because the course drops 459 feet (140 m) from start to finish and the start is quite far west of the finish, allowing a helpful tailwind, the Boston Marathon does not satisfy two of the criteria necessary for the ratification of world or American records.

At the 2011 Boston Marathon on April 18, 2011, Geoffrey Mutai of Kenya ran a time of 2:03:02, which was the fastest ever marathon at the time (since surpassed by Sabastian Sawe's 1:59:30 in London 2026). However, due to the reasons listed above, Mutai's performance was not ratified as an official world record. Bezunesh Deba from Ethiopia set the women's course record with a 2:19:59 performance on April 21, 2014. This was declared after Rita Jeptoo from Kenya was disqualified following a confirmed doping violation.

Other course records include:

- Men's Masters: John Campbell (New Zealand), 2:11:04 (set in 1990)
- Women's Masters: Firiya Sultanova-Zhdanova (Russia), 2:27:58 (set in 2002)
- Men's Push Rim Wheelchair: Marcel Hug (Switzerland), 1:17:06 (set in 2023)
- Women's Push Rim Wheelchair: Manuela Schär (Switzerland), 1:28:17 (set in 2017)
- Men's Handcycle: Tom Davis (United States), 0:58:36 (set in 2017)
- Women's Handcycle: Alicia Dana (United States), 1:18:15 (set in 2023)

World record marathon running times have been set in Boston on only four occasions. In 1947, the men's record time set was 2:25:39, by Suh Yun-Bok of South Korea. In 1975, a women's world record of 2:42:24 was set by Liane Winter of West Germany, and in 1983, Joan Benoit Samuelson of the United States ran a women's world record time of 2:22:43. In 2012, Joshua Cassidy of Canada set a men's wheelchair marathon world-record time of 1:18:25. In the 2025 Boston Marathon, Sharon Lokedi set a new women's course record of 2:17:22, reducing the previous record of 2:19:59 set in 2014. On the men’s side, John Korir won in 2:04:45, the fastest winning time since 2011. Korir also became the first winner whose brother had previously won the race (Wesley Korir, 2012)

In 2007, astronaut Sunita Williams was an official entrant of the race, running a marathon distance while on the International Space Station, becoming the first person to run a marathon in space. She was sent a specialty bib and medal by the B.A.A. on the STS-117 flight of the Space Shuttle Atlantis.

The race's organizers keep a standard time clock for all entries, though official timekeeping ceases after the six-hour mark.

== The B.A.A. ==
The Boston Athletic Association is a non-profit organized sports association that organizes the Boston Marathon and other events.

== Divisions ==
The 1975 Boston Marathon became the first major marathon to include a wheelchair division competition. Bob Hall wrote race director Will Cloney to ask if he could compete in the race in his wheelchair. Cloney wrote back that he could not give Hall a race number, but would recognize Hall as an official finisher if he completed the race in under 3 hours and 30 minutes. Hall finished in 2 hours and 58 minutes, paving the way for the wheelchair division. Ernst Van Dyk, in 2004, set a course record at 1:18.29, almost 50 minutes faster than the fastest runner.

Also in 1975, the Boston Marathon first included a women's masters division, which Sylvia Weiner won at age 44 with a time of 3:21:38.

Handcyclists have competed in the race since at least 2014. Starting in 2017, handcyclists are honored the same way runners and wheelchair racers are: with wreaths, prize money, and the playing of the men's and women's winners' national anthems.

In addition to the push rim wheelchair division, the Boston Marathon also hosts a blind/visually impaired division and a mobility impaired program. Similar to the running divisions, a set of qualifying times has been developed for these divisions to motivate aspiring athletes and ensure competitive excellence. In 1986, the introduction of prize money at the Boston Marathon gave the push rim wheelchair division the richest prize purse in the sport. More than 1,000 people with disabilities and impairments have participated in the wheelchair division, while the other divisions have gained popularity each year. In 2013, 40 blind runners participated.

The nonbinary division of the Boston Marathon was first included in 2023; it was won by Kae Ravichandran with a time of 2:38:57.

== Memorial ==
The Boston Marathon Memorial in Copley Square, which is near the finish line, was installed to mark the one-hundredth running of the race. A circle of granite blocks set in the ground surrounds a central medallion that traces the race course and other segments that show an elevation map of the course and the names of the winners.

== Notable features ==
=== Spectators ===
With approximately 500,000 spectators, the Boston Marathon is New England's most widely viewed sporting event. About 1,000 media members from more than 100 outlets received media credentials in 2011.

For the entire distance of the race, thousands line the sides of the course to cheer the runners on, encourage them, and provide free water and snacks to the runners.

=== Scream Tunnel ===
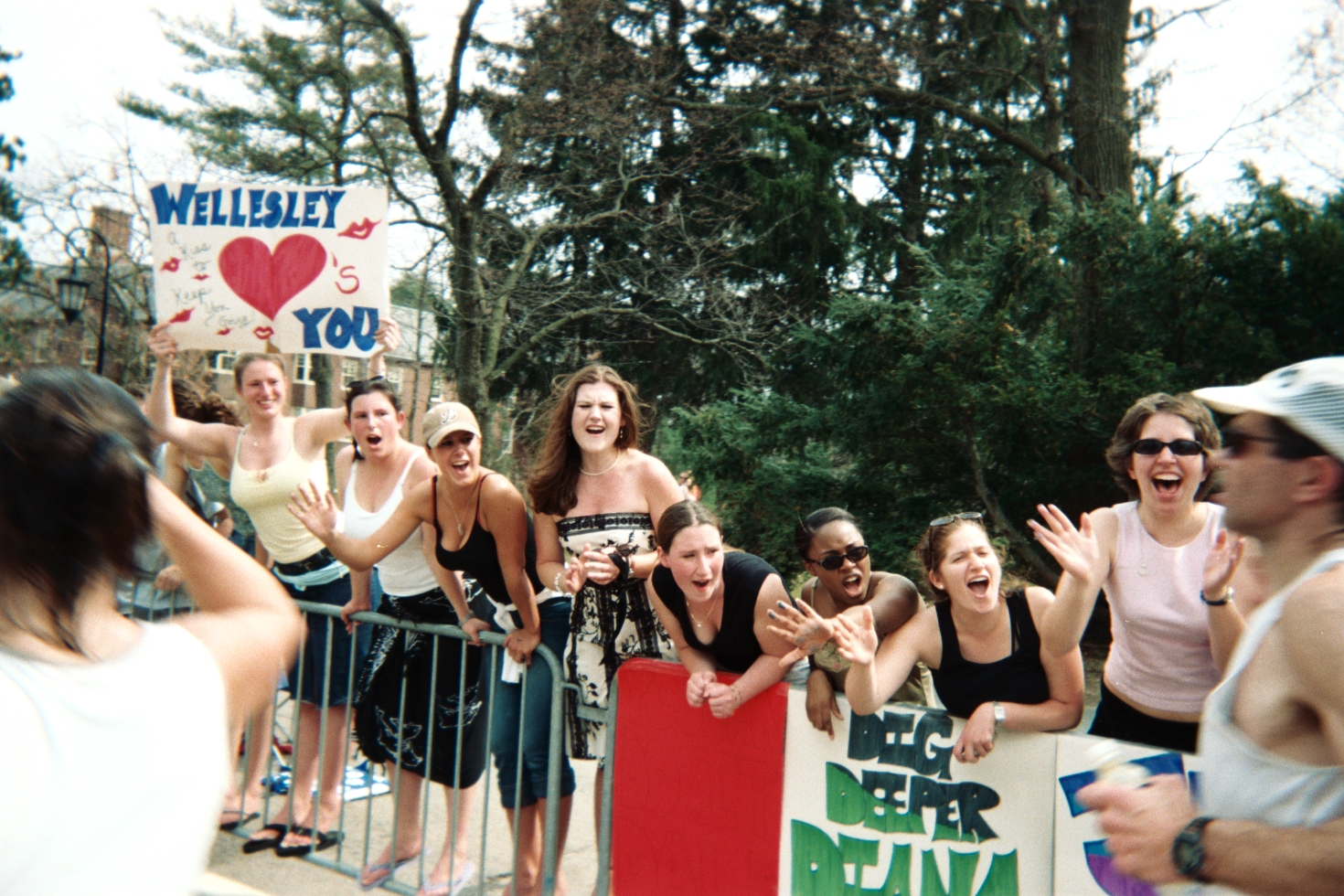
Along the course at Wellesley College

At Wellesley College, a historically women's college, it is traditional for the students to cheer on the runners in what is referred to as the Scream Tunnel. For about a quarter of a mile (400 m), the students line the course, scream, and offer kisses. The Scream Tunnel is so loud runners claim it can be heard from a mile away. The tunnel is roughly half a mile (0.8 km) prior to the halfway mark of the course.

=== Boston Red Sox ===
Every year, the Boston Red Sox play a home game at Fenway Park, starting at 11:05 a.m. When the game ends, the crowd empties into Kenmore Square to cheer as the runners enter the final mile. This tradition started in 1903. In the 1940s, the Red Sox from the American League and the Boston Braves from the National League (who moved to Milwaukee after the 1953 season) alternated yearly as to which would play the morning game. In 2007, the game between the Red Sox and the Los Angeles Angels of Anaheim was delayed until 12:18 p.m. due to heavy rain. The marathon, which had previously been run in a wide variety of weather conditions, was not delayed. The 2018 game hosting the Baltimore Orioles was postponed into May due to rain, while 2020 saw the game not played resulting from the pandemic.

In 2021, when City Connect uniforms were introduced, the Red Sox chose a design inspired by the marathon. The colors were yellow and blue, and a number "617" - the area code for Boston - was added to the left sleeve in a way reminiscent of a racing bib. They were worn on the weekend leading up to Patriots' Day; on the holiday itself, the Boston Strong uniforms commemorating the 2013 bombing were worn. A new City Connect uniform was chosen in 2025, with the marathon-themed one remaining as an alternate.

=== Military March ===
Top three finishers of the 2025 Military March category - Boston Marathon

In this category, Massachusetts Army and Air National Guard personnel compete in their miltary uniforms. The race begins at 6:00 AM, and participants must walk the entire 26.2 mile course; running is strictly prohibited. Military participants have also assisted struggling runners by providing them with medical and emotional support. Military entrants are capped to 50 bibs each year, and are competitively selected based on their overall performance within their Army and Air National Guard units.

Some military personnel also complete 22-pushups after crossing the finish line to raise awareness about veteran suicide. In 2024, after completing the 26.2-mile 2024 Boston Marathon march in his US Army uniform and finishing in first place, US Army Captain Kanwar Singh raised awareness about veteran suicide by doing 22 push-ups at the finish line.

In 2025, US Army's Lt Col Jon Novak finished in first place, Major Titmas placed in second place, while Captain Kanwar Singh finished in the third place.

=== Dick and Rick Hoyt ===
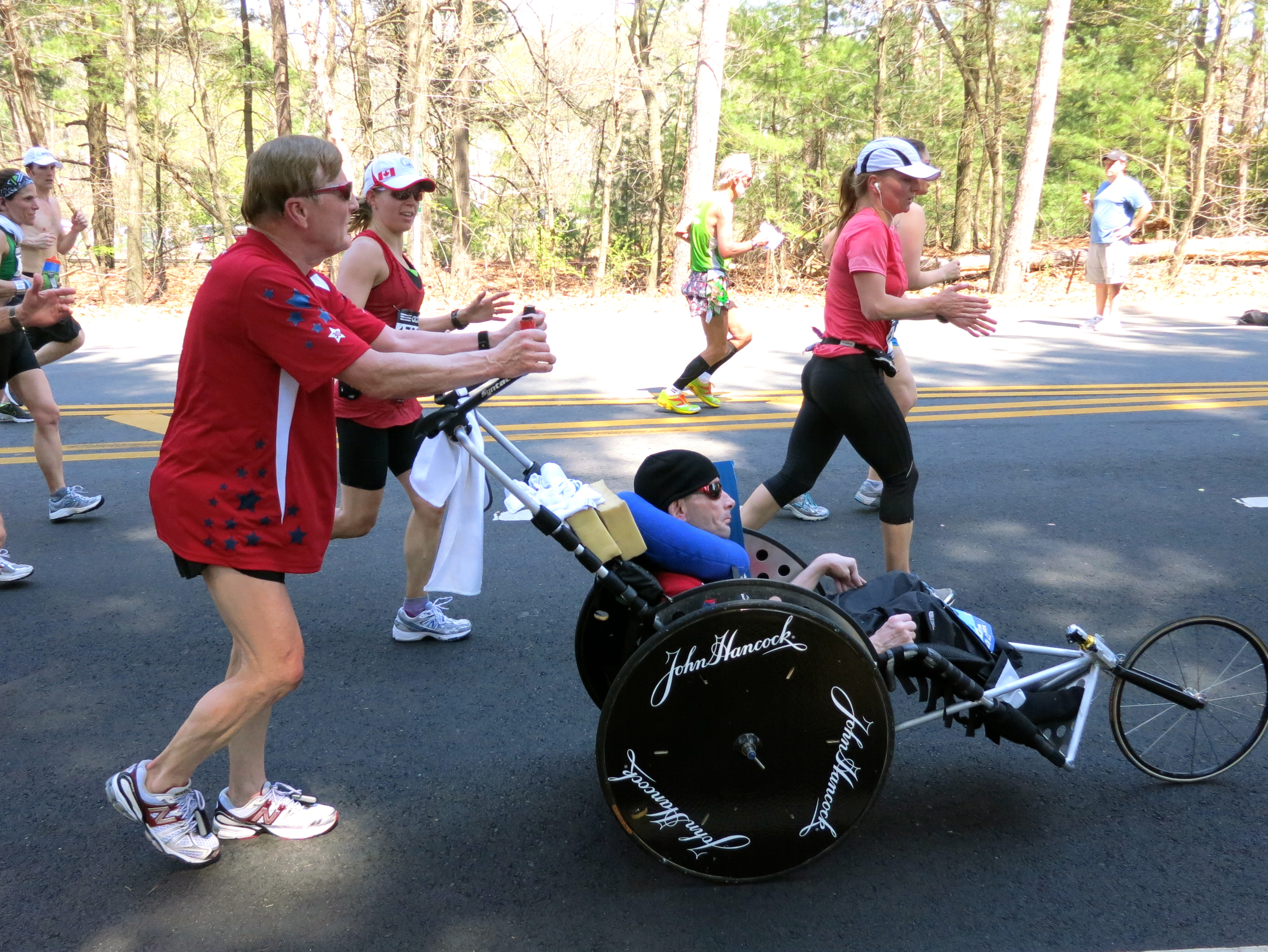
Team Hoyt at ~12.8 miles on the Marathon course on April 16, 2012

Dick and Rick Hoyt entered the Boston Marathon 32 times. Dick was the father of Rick, who had cerebral palsy. While doctors said that Rick would never have a normal life and thought that institutionalizing him was the best option, Dick and his wife disagreed and raised him at home. Eventually, a computer device was developed that helped Rick communicate with his family, and they learned that one of his biggest passions was sports. "Team Hoyt" (Dick and Rick) started competing in charity runs, with Dick pushing Rick in a wheelchair. Through August 2008, Dick and Rick had competed in 66 marathons and 229 triathlons. Their fastest marathon finish was 2:40:47. The team completed their 30th Boston Marathon in 2012, when Dick was 72 and Rick was 50. They had intended the 2013 marathon to be their final one, but due to the Boston Marathon bombing, they were stopped a mile short of completing their run, and decided to run one more marathon the following year. They completed the 2014 marathon on April 21, 2014, having previously announced that it would be their last. In tribute to his connection with the race, Dick was named the grand marshal of the 2015 marathon. He died in 2021, aged 80. Rick died in May 2023.

=== Bandits ===
Unlike many other races, the Boston Marathon tolerated "bandits" (runners who do not register and obtain a bib number). They used to be held back until after all the registered runners had left the starting line, and then were released in an unofficial fourth wave. They were generally not pulled off the course and mostly allowed to cross the finish line. For decades, these unofficial runners were treated like local folk heroes, celebrated for their endurance and spunk for entering a contest with the world's most accomplished athletes. Boston Marathon race director Dave McGillivray was once a teenage bandit.

Given the increased field that was expected for the 2014 Marathon, however, organizers planned "more than ever" to discourage bandits from running. As of September 2015 the B.A.A. website states:

Q: Can I run in the Boston Marathon as an unofficial or "bandit" runner? A: No, please do NOT run if you have not been officially entered in the race. Race amenities along the course and at the finish, such as fluids, medical care, and traffic safety, are provided based on the number of expected official entrants. Any addition to this by way of unofficial participants, adversely affects our ability to ensure a safe race for everyone.

=== Costumes ===
A number of people choose to run the course in a variety of costumes each year. During the 100th running in 1996, one runner wore a scale model of the Old North Church steeple on his back. Old North Church is where the signal was lit that set Paul Revere off on his midnight ride, which is commemorated each year on the same day as the Marathon. During the 2014 marathon, runners and spectators were discouraged from wearing "costumes covering the face or any non-form fitting, bulky outfits extending beyond the perimeter of the body," for security reasons following the 2013 bombing. However, state authorities and the Boston Athletic Association did not outright ban such costumes.

=== Ondekoza taiko drummers ===
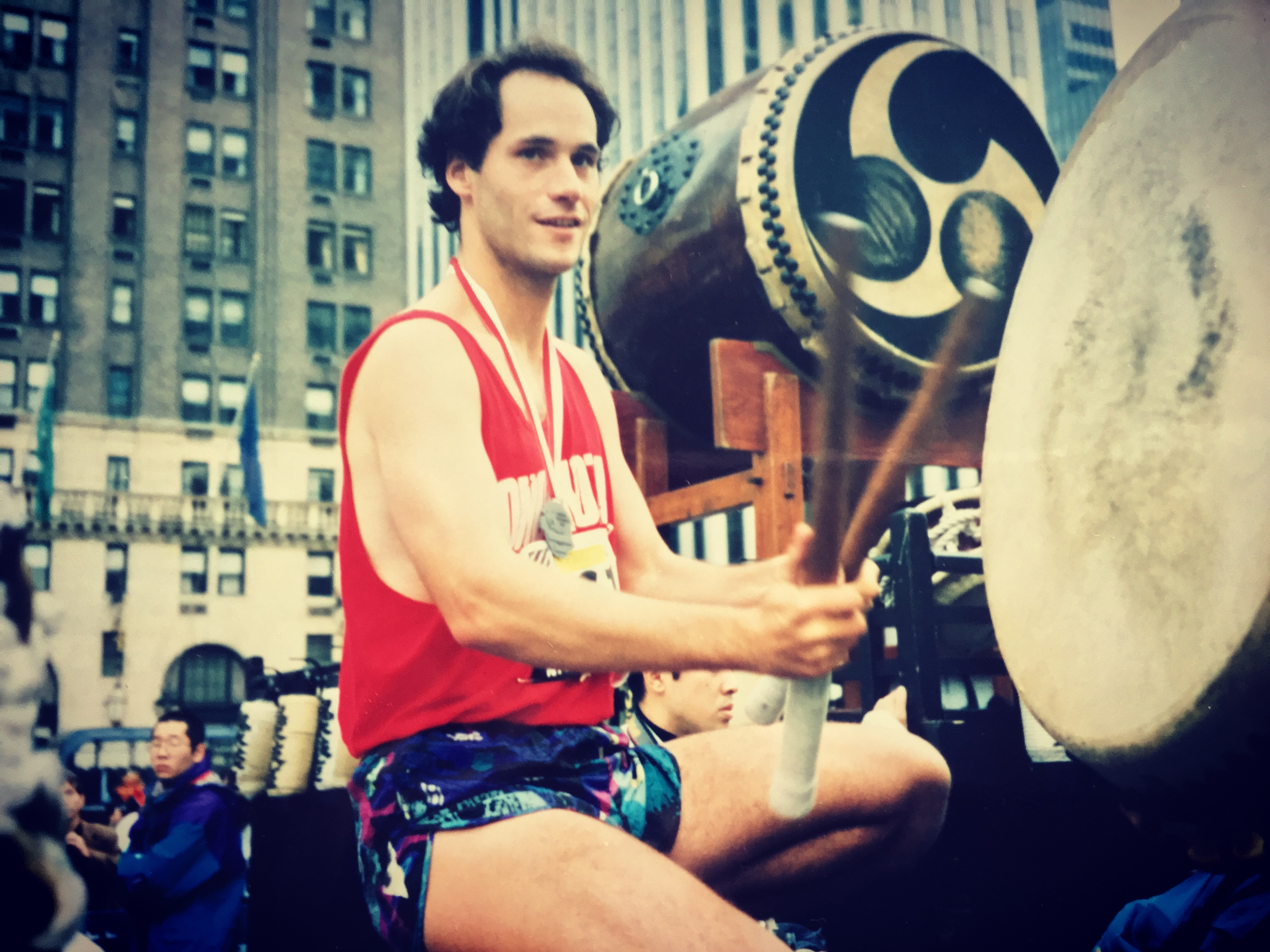
Ondekoza member Marco Lienhard playing taiko after finishing the marathon

Starting in 1975, members of Ondekoza, a group from Japan, would run the marathon and right after finishing the race would start playing their taiko drums at the finish line. They repeated the tradition several times in the 1970s and 1990s. The 700-pound (320 kg) drum would be set up at the finish line to encourage runners finishing the marathon. Bill Rodgers, who inspired member's running, was a guest on Sado Island and ran marathons in Japan with Ondekoza members. The group also ran the New York City Marathon and Los Angeles Marathon, and ran 10,000 miles (16,000 km) of the perimeter of the United States from 1990 to 1993.

=== Historical Trends in Winners and Nationalities ===
Kenyan and Ethiopian athletes have historically dominated elite Boston Marathon results, reflecting broader East African success in distance running. With accolades such as marathon world records and gold medals.

=== Controversies and Criticisms ===
In 2024, a Black-led running group called TrailblazHers Run Co. filed a lawsuit against the Boston Athletic Association (B.A.A.), the city of Newton, and the Newton police chief over an incident that occurred during the 2023 Boston Marathon. The group alleged that police officers targeted their cheering section at mile 21 of the race and formed a barricade that separated them from the course while allowing mostly white spectators in other areas to remain closer to runners. According to the lawsuit, more than 100 spectators, many of whom were people of color, had gathered to cheer and support runners when police intervened. The plaintiffs claim the actions amounted to racial profiling and harassment. The lawsuit seeks damages and policy changes to prevent similar treatment at future events. The B.A.A. stated that it was aware of the complaint but had not yet reviewed it at the time of the report.

== See also ==
- List of winners of the Boston Marathon
- List of marathon races in North America
- The Sports Museum (at TD Garden)
- Boston Athletic Association
- Newton, Massachusetts
