= Ernst van Aaken =

German athletics trainer (1910–1984)

Ernst van Aaken (16 May 1910, in Emmerich – 2 April 1984, in Schwalmtal-Waldniel) was a German sports physician and athletics trainer. Van Aaken became known as the "Running Doctor" and was the founder of the training method called the Waldnieler Dauerlauf (German: "Waldniel endurance run"). He is generally recognized as the founder of the long slow distance method of endurance training.

As a sports physician, trainer and advocate of new developments he directed himself fanatically to distance running and the training of "pure endurance" ("reine Ausdauer") with high mileage in the training program. He was an opponent of the method of interval training that prevailed until the mid-1960s. In the early 1960s, van Aaken trained, among others, the German athlete Harald Norpoth, who won silver in the 1964 Olympic Games in Tokyo in the 5000 meters. In 1972 Van Aaken was hit by a car during his own training, which cost him both legs. Since this accident he moved in a wheelchair and became also a champion for disabled sports and wheelchair racing. He also held countless lectures, including in the United States and Japan, and organized running races, especially marathons for women, besides ultra running events.

== Health and longevity ==
Van Aaken stated that human beings were able to reach the age of 100, if they would not live so "hopelessly unbiologically". In the "biologic" life style that he advocated, sports played an important role, especially the development of endurance. He lauded a daily endurance run for everybody, also for women, elders and children, combined with moderate eating and drinking. He also held the opinion that the female sex would eventually perform better in endurance events than the male, if all social barriers were dealt with that currently enhinder this. To propagate his ideas, he wrote a number of books, the most famous titled Programmiert für 100 Lebensjahre ("Programmed for lifespan 100").

== Proponent of women's running ==
Van Aaken was an early proponent of women's running.

In 1967, van Aaken asked Anni Pede, a 27-year-old middle-distance runner and mother of two also from West Germany, and Monika Boers, a 19-year-old from the Netherlands, to participate in a marathon organized by his running club in Waldniel. (Note: The Association of Road Racing Statisticians notes that Pede was West German and that Boers was Dutch.) According to German sports historian Karl Lennartz, journalists skeptical of 13-year-old Maureen Wilton's recent world best in Toronto, Ontario, Canada asked van Aaken if women and teenagers were capable of such a performance. Mocked and derided for claiming that faster times were indeed possible, van Aaken chose Pede and Boers to prove himself correct. Although the German Athletic Association (Deutscher Leichtathletik-Verband) did not yet officially permit women to run, race officials did allow the two women to start 30 meters behind the men. Pede came in third, her 3:07:26.2 set a new world best, and Boers finished in 3:19:36.3.

Van Aaken had tested this before in women's cross country races which had no distance limit for women. He had all the support of the regional track & field association of which he was the women's spokesman which facilitated his tasks to further women's athletics (Note: The ARRS notes that Pede set the first German mark and Boers set the first Dutch mark in the women's marathon.)

== See also ==
- Kenneth H. Cooper
- Jim Fixx
- Joe Henderson (runner)
- Kathrine Switzer
- Bobbi Gibb
- Gender issues
- Biology of gender
