= Mavis Hutchison =

South African ultramarathon runner (1924–2022)

Mavis Hutchison (25 November 1924 – 19 May 2022) was a South African athlete, primarily known for running in ultramarathons.

== Career ==
Born in South Africa, Hutchison's career began as a race walker, and her first record was in the 50-mile walk known as the Rand Daily Mail Big Walk in 1963 (9 hours 35 minutes). That same year she was timed over the standard marathon distance of 42.2 km, but took about ten minutes longer than Violet Piercy had done in 1926, and 13 minutes longer than Merry Lepper's time a few months later.

In 1965, she was (as an unofficial entrant) the third woman in history to finish the 90 km of the Comrades Marathon, and the first since the 1930s. In later years she completed the race seven more times (1966, 1971, 1973, 1976, 1977, 1980, 1981).

Hutchison went on to set new women's world records for the 100-mile and 24-hour run in 1971, and for the 100-mile and 24-hour walk in 1973. In 1973 Hutchison became the first woman to run the 602 km from Germiston (near Johannesburg) to Durban in 1973, following this with the 'up' run from Durban to Germiston the following year. By this time she was well known in South Africa as the 'Galloping Granny'. In 1975 she took a bit over 22 days to run the 1000 miles from Pretoria, South Africa's administrative capital, to Cape Town, the legislative capital. That same year she entered the Comrades for the first time as an official participant, even though the Pretoria to Cape Town run had left her in poor shape for the race, but dropped out toward the end when she realized she would finish outside the maximum allowed time of 11 hours. In 1976 she ran from Germiston to Cape Town (about the same distance), beating her previous time by more than three days, and in 1977 she ran from Messina, on South Africa's northern border, to Johannesburg.

Hutchison became famous as the first woman to run across the United States, from Los Angeles to New York City. Her route, run in 1978 as a 53-year-old grandmother, took her 2871 miles and 69 days, 2hours and 40 minutes. According to the Guinness Book of Records this record still stands, although there is a claim by Lorna Michael (age 34) in 1993, of 64 days as part of the Trans-America Footrace in 1993.

Two years later, Hutchison set a new women's record for the John O'Groats to Land's End, once more fighting extreme physical difficulties to reach her goal. Her last long runs were from Pretoria to Cape Town in 1982, and a circuitous 3200 km run around much of South Africa in 1985, starting in Kimberley and ending in Cape Town.

Hutchison first entered the World Master's Games in 1977 (Gothenburg Sweden), and subsequently entered the Master's Games in 1979 (Hanover Germany), 1993 (Maizaki Japan), 2006 (San Sebastian Spain) and 2007 (Riccione Italy), winning numerous medals.

From 2005, Hutchison set South African W80+ master records for 100 metres (18.84 sec), 200 metres (45.46 sec), 400 metres (1:52.88 min), and 800 metres (4:34.13 min).

== Death ==
Hutchison died in Fish Hoek on 19 May 2022, at the age of 97.
