= Elizabeth Bonner =

Elizabeth Bonner may refer to:

- Beth Bonner (1952–1998), American long-distance runner
- Elizabeth Anne Bonner (1924–1981), author of Western fiction and poetry
