= Caroline Walker (athlete) =

American long-distance runner

Caroline Walker (born October 15, 1953) is a former American long-distance runner from Oregon who is recognized by the International Association of Athletics Federations as having set a world best in the marathon on February 28, 1970 with a time of 3:02:53 at the inaugural Trail's End Marathon in Seaside, Oregon. (Note: Ryan Watt of The Portland Tribune reported that Walker was also the first American woman to hold a world best in the marathon; however, it is unclear where he obtained this information. Information provided from the Association of Road Racing Statisticians is equally unclear as they include Walker's performance in their progression for the world best but not in their progression for the American best. The International Association of Athletics Federations, the international governing body for the sport of athletics, notes that Merry Lepper was the first American woman to hold a world best in the marathon)

Walker's performance was made while she was a junior at Grant High School in Portland. Although the school did not have official track or cross country teams, Walker began running competitively as a freshman. She ran for the Oregon Track Club. In 1970, Walker was the Oregon high school state champion in the mile and runner-up in the 3,000 meters at the AAU national championships held at UCLA. She also won the Junior AAU Cross-Country Championship held in Portland on November 13, 1971 (15:58).

In the early 1970s, Walker attended the University of Oregon where she received instruction from the legendary Steve Prefontaine. After Prefontaine's death, she lived in his house with his girlfriend and sister. Walker represented the United States in the 1972 International Cross Country Championships, where she placed 9th winning silver with the US team, and the 1973 IAAF World Cross Country Championships, winning team bronze with an individual 30th place, and was an All-American in cross country in 1973. From 1972 to 1978, she won Oregon Road Runners Club women's aquathlon, a biathlon consisting of running and swimming, six consecutive times. In 1981, Walker returned to college at Oregon State University where she was briefly coached by Joe Fulton. There she would set a school records in the 5,000 meters and 10,000 meters. Walker was also the Oregon state triathlon champion in 1984, 1986, and 1987. Injuries and the nature of her cross country training schedule prevented her from running another marathon. For her achievements, Walker was inducted into the Portland Interscholastic League's Hall of Fame in 2005.

Walker claims that mercury in the dental fillings she received during her last year at Oregon negatively affected her health and her running performance, and that a lower back injury sustained at a chiropractor's office ended her running career. From 1995 to 1997, she worked for a physician specializing in the alternative medicine treatments of neural therapy and prolotherapy.

As of 2009, Walker is a colorpuncturist living in Santa Fe, New Mexico.

[Steve Prefontaine] gave me the compliment of saying that I was the person most like him of anybody he’d ever met.

— Caroline Walker

== Notes ==
Records
Preceded by (West Germany) Anni Pede-Erdkamp	Women's Marathon World Record Holder; February 28, 1970 – May 9, 1971	Succeeded by (United States) Elizabeth Bonner
