= Sy Mah =

Canadian distance runner (1926–1988)

Thian K. "Sy" Mah (August 2, 1926 – November 7, 1988) was an assistant professor of physical education at the University of Toledo and a Canadian long-distance runner who held a Guinness World Records mark for the most lifetime marathons (524). (Note: The University of Toledo states Mah's official position as "assistant professor of health promotion and human performance".)

== Early life, education, and career ==
The son of a Chinese immigrant family, Mah was born in Bashaw, Alberta in 1926. English was his native language and he did not speak Mandarin, but he was able to write his Chinese name. He earned an arts degree from the University of Alberta in 1952, a physical education degree from McMaster University in 1960, a Bachelor of Education from the University of Toronto in 1962, and a master's degree in education from the University of Toronto around 1970. Mah taught in Ontario from 1955 to 1970. From 1970 to 1988, he also established and taught exercise and cardiac rehabilitation classes at the University of Toledo where he was a physical education instructor.

Mah joined the Chinese Association of Greater Toledo in 1970 and later served as its program director.

== Running ==
Mah, described as "an ordinary runner of ordinary speed", did not begin running marathons until he was 40. He reportedly took up the sport to prevent heart disease that ran in his family. In 1964, he formed the Metro Toronto Fitness Club with three others, and later started the North York Track Club where he coached Maureen Wilton. That club was considered one of the best in North America and Wilton was one of its star athletes.

Mah and the 13-year-old Wilton both ran their debut marathons on May 6, 1967, at York University in Toronto, Ontario. Wilton ran the first three laps of the five lap course with Mah and she went on to finish in a time of 3:15:23, a performance recognized as a world best by the International Association of Athletics Federations. (Note: The Association of Road Racing Statisticians notes Maureen Wilton's official time as 3:15:22.8.) Invited by Mah, Kathrine Switzer also ran that day – only sixteen days after her historic run at the Boston Marathon.

Mah ran the Glass City Marathon in Toledo, Ohio numerous times, his first at the inaugural event in 1971. By 1977, he completed his 100th marathon there with a 3:18:18 performance. Three years at the same race, his tenth on the Glass City course, Mah posted his 173rd. In 1981, Mah ran his 198th marathon to break the record for most marathons set by Ted Corbitt. When possible, race directors would issue bib numbers to match his marathon total. He would later run his 300th in Detroit (1983), his 400th in Virginia (1986), and his 500th in Boston (1988). The 1984 New York City Marathon was Mah's 348th marathon and 35th of the year. At least one race director scheduled back-to-back marathons on Saturday and Sunday to help him add to his totals. Mah ran the Boston Marathon twenty times and was a regular participant in ultramarathons and triathlons as well as cross-country skiing and canoe races.

In recognition of his role in promoting the sport of distance running, he was invited to participate in the 152-mile Spartathlon in Greece. Although he did not finish the event, he was publicly honored by the Greeks for "his love of competition". Mah's personal best over the marathon distance was 3:13, however, he felt he could go faster if determined to do so. Hal Higdon commented that he believed Mah was capable of running a marathon under three hours if he trained for a specific race.

Mah's last race was a 50 kilometer event Labour Day weekend, 1988, in St. Jacobs, Ontario; he dropped out of the Toronto Marathon three weeks later. Mah's record would last until 1994 when broken by Norm Frank of Rochester, New York. (Note: According to Hal Higdon, Norm Frank had run 870 marathons by the end of 2004.)

== Death and legacy ==
Following a lingering bout of hepatitis, Mah died of leukemia at the St. Vincent Mercy Medical Center in Toledo, Ohio in 1988. Following his death, he was a subject of a case report that appeared in the May 1991 issue of the medical journal Chest. According to that report, Mah received a cardiac stress test nine months prior to his death which found "ischemia with disseminated circadian variation suggesting possible [coronary vasospasm] without angina." Autopsy revealed localized fibrosis of the left papillary muscles, but no evidence of coronary atherosclerosis.

Mah has been described as "an early leader of the modern running boom". Joe Henderson wrote an editorial in tribute to Mah in 1989. According to Henderson, Mah stated: "I believe Americans have been brainwashed with the idea that they must do less because increased age will result in less energy and diminished capacity. I have found this is simply not true if a person does not allow his mind to accept the traditional view of aging."

Along with Dick Beardsley, Herb Lorenz, and Harold Tinsley, Mah was a 1989 inductee of the Road Runners Club of America's Hall of Fame.

The Sy Mah Memorial Scholarship at the University of Toledo was established in 1990 by Mah's friend and family. In addition to meeting various academic standards, qualified recipients within the College of Health Science and Human Service are required to be "avid social runners". A portion of the proceeds from the annual Glass City Marathon go to fund this award. Participants in that race pass by a life-size statue of Mah that was dedicated September 13, 2002 in Olander Park in Sylvania, Ohio. The statue was created by Thomas Lingeman, a Professor of Art at the University of Toledo, who was commissioned by the Toledo Road Runners Club.

At the annual Sri Chinmoy 24-Hour Race in Ottawa, Ontario, Canada, the Sy Mah Award is given to the runner who completes at least 100 miles and runs the most even 50-mile splits. The wood-carved trophy is shaped to resemble an hourglass symbolizing Mah's "balance and steadiness".

Mah's papers are held at the Ward M. Canaday Center at the University of Toledo.

== Notes ==
Records
Preceded by (United States) Ted Corbitt	Guinness World Records - Most marathons 1981 – 1994	Succeeded by (United States) Norm Frank
