= 1977 Berlin Marathon =

4th Berlin Marathon
- Venue: Berlin, West Germany
- Date: 10 September

Champions
- Men: Günter Mielke (2:15:19, NC); Norman Wilson (2:16:21)
- Women: Christa Vahlensieck (2:34:48 NC); Angelika Brandt 3:10:27

The 1977 Berlin Marathon was the fourth running of the annual marathon race held in Berlin, West Germany, held on 10 September. There were two sections to the marathon in that year's running. The Berlin race hosted the West German national championship, which was started an hour after the regular mass race.

The men's and women's winners of the mass race were Great Britain's Norman Wilson (2:16:21) and West Germany's Angelika Brandt (3:10:27) while better results came in the West German championship through Günter Mielke (2:15:19) and Christa Vahlensieck (2:34:48). Vahlensieck's time was a marathon world record. A total of 230 runners finished the mass race, comprising 219 men and 11 women.

== Mass results ==
=== Men ===
Rank	Athlete	Nationality	Time
1st place, gold medalist(s)	Norman Wilson	United Kingdom	2:16:21
2nd place, silver medalist(s)	Michael Hurd	United Kingdom	2:17:03
3rd place, bronze medalist(s)	George Edgington	United Kingdom	2:19:11
4	Tom Fleming	United States	2:20:27

=== Women ===
Rank	Athlete	Nationality	Time
1st place, gold medalist(s)	Angelika Brandt	West Germany	3:10:27
2nd place, silver medalist(s)	Ingrid Winter	West Germany	3:50:43
3rd place, bronze medalist(s)	Ingrid Stöbe	West Germany	3:54:11

== West German championship results ==
=== Men ===
Rank	Athlete	Nationality	Time
1st place, gold medalist(s)	Günter Mielke	West Germany	2:15:19
2nd place, silver medalist(s)	Winfried Hellwig	West Germany	2:15:37
3rd place, bronze medalist(s)	Paul Angenvoorth	West Germany	2:15:42

=== Women ===
Rank	Athlete	Nationality	Time
1st place, gold medalist(s)	Christa Vahlensieck	West Germany	2:34:48
2nd place, silver medalist(s)	Manuela Angenvoorth	West Germany	2:38:10
3rd place, bronze medalist(s)	Ingrid Stöbe	West Germany	2:55:10
