= Percy Beames =

Personal information
- Full name: Percy James Beames
- Born: 27 July 1911; Ballarat, Victoria
- Died: 28 March 2004 (aged 92); Melbourne
- Original team: Golden Point (Ballarat)
- Height: 165 cm (5 ft 5 in)
- Weight: 70 kg (154 lb)
- Position: Rover

Playing career^{1}
Years	Club	Games (Goals)
1931–1944	Melbourne	213 (323)

Coaching career
Years	Club	Games (W–L–D)
1942–1944	Melbourne	48 (19–29–0)
- ^{1} Playing statistics correct to the end of 1944.

Career highlights
- 3× VFL premierships: 1939, 1940, 1941; Melbourne captain: 1942–1944; Melbourne Team of the Century–forward-pocket; Australian Football Hall of Fame, inducted 1996; Melbourne Hall of Fame

"Untitled". Archived from the original on 7 January 2010.

Percy James Beames (27 July 1911 – 28 March 2004) was an Australian sportsman who played Australian rules football for the Melbourne Football Club in the Victorian Football League (VFL) as well as first-class cricket for Victoria in the Sheffield Shield. He later became one of Melbourne's most distinguished sports journalists, covering cricket and Australian rules football for The Age until 1976. When the Australian Football Hall of Fame was established in 1996, Beames was among the inaugural inductees, and was also named in the forward pocket when Melbourne's Team of the Century was named in June 2000.

== Early life ==
Born to a large, poor family in Ballarat, Beames' lucky break came when he was awarded a scholarship to Ballarat College. He ended up captaining the school in Australian football, cricket, athletics and tennis.

== Cricket career ==
Beames became a member of the South Melbourne Cricket Club for the 1929/1930 season. In 1931 he moved to the Melbourne Cricket Club. Beames represented Victoria on 18 occasions between 1933 and 1946, scoring 1186 runs at 51.56. During this time he scored three first-class centuries with a highest score of 226 not out in 1938 at Launceston. Beames was appointed captain of Victoria for the first post-war season in 1945. He, however, left cricket the year after this to concentrate on a career in football.

== Footballing career ==
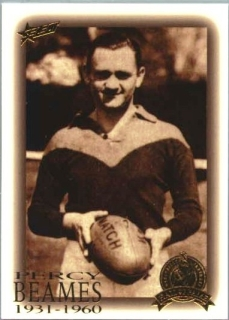
Beames in 1944

Beames joined Melbourne in 1931 and soon established himself as the club's rover. In his first two seasons he polled well in the Brownlow Medal, finishing equal fifth on both occasions. He was part of their hat-trick of premierships that went from 1939 to 1941 and captain-coached Melbourne from 1942 to 1944.

== Later life ==
After finishing his football career he became a writer at The Age newspaper for 30 years. He was also inducted into the Australian Football Hall of Fame.

Beames was the father of Adrienne Beames, a former long-distance runner frequently credited as the first woman to break the three-hour barrier in the marathon.

== See also ==
- List of Victoria first-class cricketers
