= 1981 New York City Marathon =

Footrace held in New York City

- Date: 25 October
- Location: (United States) New York City, NY
- Event type: Marathon
- Distance: 42.045 km
- Edition: 12th
- Course records: 2:08:12 (1981 men); 2:25.28 (1981 women)
- Website: Official website

The 1981 New York City Marathon was the 12th edition of the New York City Marathon and took place in New York City on 25 October. The winning times in both the men's and women's race were initially considered as world bests. However, in December 1984, the 1981 route was remeasured by the National Running Data Center and found to be about 150 metres short of the prescribed 42,195m distance, outside the margin of error of 0.2% (84 meters) permitted for record purposes.

== Results ==
=== Men ===
Rank	Athlete	Country	Time
1st place, gold medalist(s)	Alberto Salazar	United States	2:08.12,7
2nd place, silver medalist(s)	Jukka Toivola	Finland	2:10.52,1
3rd place, bronze medalist(s)	Hugh Jones	England	2:10.59,8
4	Nicholas Brawn	England	2:11.09,8
5	Ryszard Marczak	Poland	2:11.35,4
6	Tony Sandoval	United States	2:12.12,5
7	Rodolfo Gómez	Mexico	2:12.47,0
8	Demetrio Cabanillas	Mexico	2:13.10,0
9	Alex Kasich	United States	2:13.19,1
10	Tommy Persson	Sweden	2:13.23,5
11	John Lodwick	United States	2:13.26,4
12	Kjell-Erik Ståhl	Sweden	2:13.31,1
13	Ferenc Szekeres	Hungary	2:13.35,1
14	Inge Simonsen	Norway	2:13.38,0
15	Odis Sanders	United States	2:14.01,1
16	Massimo Magnani	Italy	2:14.27,1
17	Luis Ostolozaga	United States	2:14.29,5
18	Oyvind Dahl	Norway	2:14.40,8
19	Malcolm East	England	2:14.50,6
20	Walter Saeger	United States	2:15.02,1
21	Terence Colton	England	2:15.05,6
22	Christopher Stewart	England	2:15.08,4
23	Edson Bergara	Brazil	2:15.11,0
24	Robert Hodge	United States	2:15.33,1
25	Sal Vega	United States	2:15.52,1

=== Women ===
Rank	Athlete	Country	Time
1st place, gold medalist(s)	Allison Roe	New Zealand	2:25.28,8
2nd place, silver medalist(s)	Ingrid Kristiansen	Norway	2:30.08,3
3rd place, bronze medalist(s)	Julie Shea	United States	2:30.11,6
4	Laura Fogli	Italy	2:34.47,7
5	Jan Yerkes	United States	2:35.39,1
6	Karoline Nemetz	Sweden	2:37.05,4
7	Carol Gould	England	2:37.25,4
8	Birgit Bringslid	Sweden	2:40.16,3
9	Julie Brown	United States	2:40.48
10	Sarah Quinn	United States	2:42.50,1
11	Shirley Durtschi	United States	2:43.40,4
12	Carol Cook	United States	2:44.15
13	Judith Hine	New Zealand	2:44.31
14	Sissel Grottenberg	Norway	2:45.04
15	Ann Gladue	United States	2:45.32,6
16	Marilyn Hulak	United States	2:46.02,3
17	Sharon Barbano	United States	2:46.45,9
18	Christine Burden	New Caledonia	2:47.08,7
19	Christine Seeman	France	2:47.38,6
20	Burke Koncelik	United States	2:48.05,3
21	Robyn Hames	New Zealand	2:48.13,9
22	Ann-Katrin Walstam	Sweden	2:48.57,7
23	Jean Chodnicki	United States	2:49.25,1
24	Madeline Harmeling	United States	2:49.26,6
25	Zehava Shmueli	Israel	2:49.52,0
