= Violet Piercy =

English long-distance runner (1889–1972)

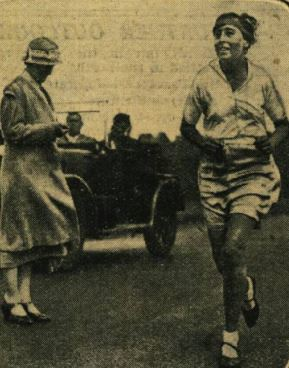
- in 1934
- Born: Violet Stewart Louisa Piercy; 24 December 1889
- Died: 11 April 1972 (aged 82)
- Known for: Long-distance runner

Violet Stewart Louisa Piercy (24 December 1889 – 11 April 1972) was an English long-distance runner who is recognized by the International Association of Athletics Federations as having set the first women's world best in the marathon on 3 October 1926 with a time of 3:40:22. (Note: The marathon world record progression of the Association of Road Running Statisticians includes Piercy, however, it notes Marie-Louise Ledru of France as the first woman. According to the ARRS, Ledru ran 5:40:xx at the Tour de Paris Marathon held on 29 September 1918.) Piercy was reported to have run unofficially and her mark was set on the Polytechnic Marathon course between Windsor and London. (Note: A number of sources, including Kathrine Switzer, have reported that the venue for Piercy's mark was the actual Polytechnic Marathon; however, records from the Association of Road Racing Statisticians confirm that the 1926 Polytechnic Marathon was held on 18 May. The course for the Polytechnic Marathon did vary over the years and there is currently very little information available to state exactly which route was run by Piercy. Although the IAAF progression notes the location for her performance as "Chiswick", the Polytechnic Marathon did not end in Chiswick until 1938. Prior to 1933, the Polytechnic Marathon ended at Stamford Bridge in West London. An ESPN reference does note Stamford Bridge as the location where Piercy's run finished.)

== Early life ==
Piercy was born Violet Stewart Louisa Piercy on 24 December 1889 in Croydon. Her father was George Piercy; her mother was Louisa Sophia Piercy. Her father died shortly after her birth; a brother died aged 8. She attended the Old Palace of John Whitgift School. In 1923, she worked as a medical secretary in south London.

== Running ==
According to The New York Times, when Piercy began obtaining publicity for her running, "the prevailing notion at the time was that women were too fragile to run more than a few hundred feet." One of her early publicized runs took place in October 1926, when she ran the London marathon course of that era in 3 hours 40 minutes and 22 seconds, although researchers since believe she may have only run about twenty miles. On 1 August 1927 she set a record at the British games for a ten-mile run in 1 hour 13 minutes. In 1928, she again attempted the London marathon race but stopped after twenty miles due to excessive heat, with a time of 3 hours 31 minutes.

In March 1935, she became established as "one of the first known female endurance runners in Britain", according to The New York Times, after her public five-mile run from Highgate to the Monument in the centre of London marking the starting location of the Great Fire of London, including the 311 stairs to the top of the Monument, which she completed in 43 minutes and 2 seconds.

She also ran the London marathon in 1933 and 1936, finishing both in about 4 hours and 25 minutes. In 1933, she also completed a 22-mile run approved by the Women's Amateur Athletic Association, through sleet and rain, in 3 hours 45 minutes. In 1936, she was permitted to begin ahead of the male runners in the London marathon, and her completion time remained the women's record until Dale Greig surpassed the record in 1964.

According to the IAAF, Piercy's 1926 time stood for 37 years until Merry Lepper's 3:37:07 performance at the Western Hemisphere Marathon on 16 December 1963. (Note: According to the Association of Road Racing Statisticians, the course for the Western Hemisphere Marathon was short in 1962 and 1963. The ARRS also notes the date of the race as 14 December 1963.)

== Later life and death ==
Following multiple moves after World War II, she may have lived in a women's shelter after the late 1950s. Records indicate she may have lived in Battersea and Wandsworth until the late 1950s.

A death certificate dated 11 April 1972 for "Violet Pearson, otherwise Violet Piercy, otherwise Violet Pierce" gives brain haemorrhage as the cause of death at University College Hospital in London. Her death certificate states that she had no fixed address.

== Notes ==
Records
Preceded by record established	Women's Marathon World Record Holder; 3 October 1926 – 16 December 1963* (*see explanation in the Notes section)	Succeeded by (United States) Merry Lepper
