= Marie-Louise Ledru =

French athlete

Marie-Louise Ledru was a French athlete who has been credited as the first woman to race the now-defined marathon distance of 42.195 km. On 29 September 1918 Ledru reportedly completed the Tour de Paris Marathon in a time of 5 hours and 40 minutes and finished in 38th place.

The International Association of Athletics Federations, the international governing body for the sport of athletics, however, recognizes Violet Piercy from England as having set the first women's world best in the marathon on 3 October 1926 with a time of 3:40:22.
