= Anni Pede-Erdkamp =

German long-distance runner (1940–2025)

Anni Pede-Erdkamp (14 January 1940 – 9 October 2025) was a West German long-distance runner who was recognized by the International Association of Athletics Federations as having set a world best in the marathon on 16 September 1967, with a time of 3:07:27 in Waldniel, West Germany. (Note: The Association of Road Racing Statisticians notes Pede's official time as 3:07:26.2)

== Biography ==
Pede and Monika Boers were asked by Ernst van Aaken, an early proponent of women's running, to participate in a race organized by his running club. According to German sports historian Karl Lennartz, journalists skeptical of 13-year-old Maureen Wilton's recent world best in Toronto, Canada asked van Aaken if women and teenagers were capable of such a performance. Mocked and derided for claiming that faster times were indeed possible, van Aaken chose Pede, a middle-distance runner and mother of two, and Boers, a 19-year-old from the Netherlands, to prove himself correct. (Note: The ARRS notes that Boers was Dutch.) Although the German Athletic Association (Deutscher Leichtathletik-Verband) did not yet officially permit women to run, race officials did allow the two women to start 30 meters behind the men. Pede's mark was good enough for third overall and Boers finished in 3:19:36.3. (Note: The ARRS notes that Boers set the first Dutch mark in the women's marathon.)

Pede-Erdkamp died on 9 October 2025, at the age of 85.

== Notes ==
Records
Preceded by (Canada) Maureen Wilton	Women's Marathon World Record Holder; 16 September 1967 – 28 February 1970	Succeeded by (United States) Caroline Walker
