= Marathon world record progression =

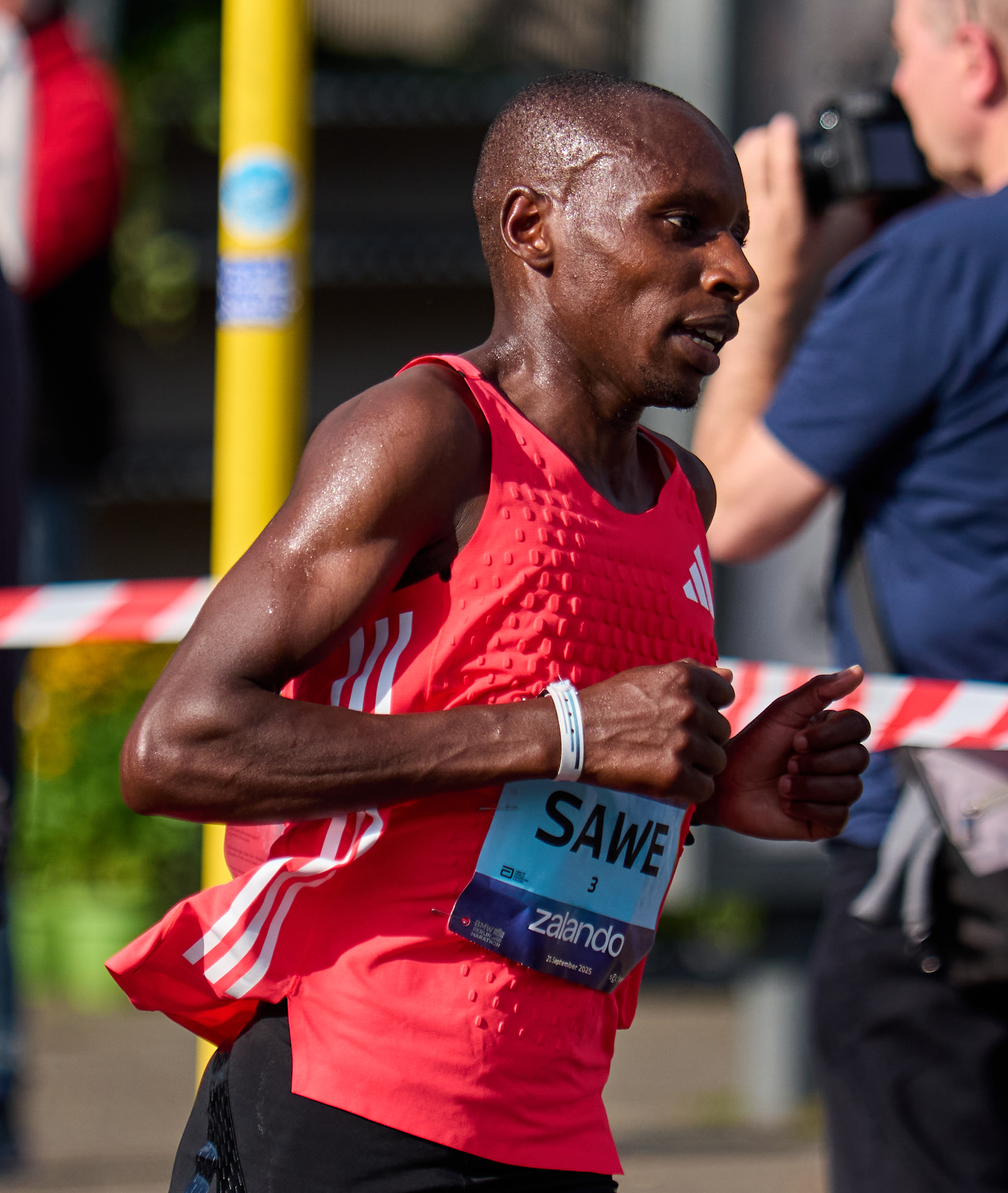
Sabastian Sawe, the men's marathon world record holder

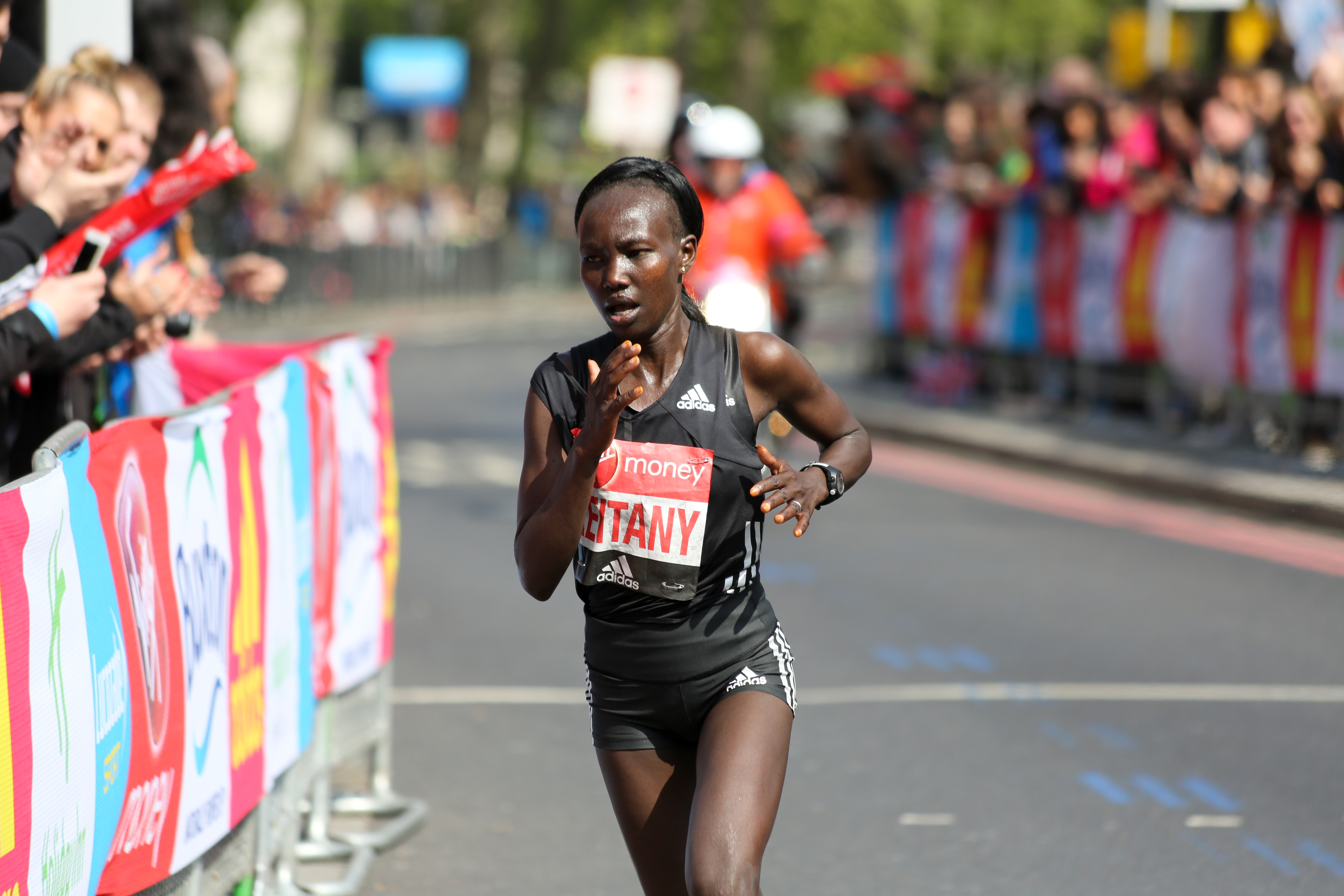
Mary Keitany during her women-only world record run at the 2017 London Marathon with 2:17:01

World records in the marathon are ratified by World Athletics, the international governing body for the sport of athletics.

Sabastian Sawe set the men's world record of 1:59:30 at the London Marathon on April 26, 2026, becoming the first person in history to run a sub two-hour marathon in race conditions.

Kenyan athlete Ruth Chepng'etich broke the women's world record with a time of 2:09:56 on October 13, 2024, at the 2024 Chicago Marathon, a mixed-sex race.

In addition to the standard women's marathon world record, World Athletics recognizes a second world record for women in the "Women Only" category for races run on a course without any male athletes in the competition. The current "Women Only" record of 2:15:41 was set by Tigst Assefa on April 26, 2026, at the London Marathon in the elite women's race.

== History ==
Marathon races were first held in 1896, but the distance was not standardized by the International Association of Athletics Federations (IAAF, now World Athletics) until 1921.

The actual distance for pre-1921 races frequently varied from the 1921 standard of 42.195 km (26 miles 385 yards). In qualifying races for the 1896 Summer Olympics, Greek runners Charilaos Vasilakos (3:18:00) and Ioannis Lavrentis (3:11:27) won the first two modern marathons. On April 10, 1896, Spiridon Louis of Greece won the first Olympic marathon in Athens, Greece, in a time of 2:58:50. However, the distance for the event was 40,000 meters. (Note: The Association of Road Racing Statisticians has estimated the course distance to be 37–38 km.) Three months later, British runner Len Hurst won the inaugural Paris to Conflans Marathon (also around 40 km) in a time of 2:31:30. In 1900, Hurst would better his time on the same course with a 2:26:28 performance. (Note: According to the "Sporting Records" section of The Canadian Year Book for 1905: "Len Hurst won the Marathon race, 40 kilometres (24 miles, 1505 yards), over roads, Conflans to Paris, Fr., in the record time of 2.26:27 3–5, July 8, 1900." Other sources confirm that the direction of the 1900 race was reversed, but note Hurst's finishing time as 2:26:47.4. or 2:26:48.)

Later, Shizo Kanakuri of Japan was reported to have set a world record of 2:32:45 in a November 1911 domestic qualification race for the 1912 Summer Olympics, but this performance was also run over a distance of approximately 40 km. (Note: Road running historian Andy Milroy writing for the Association of Road Racing Statisticians has indicated that 25 miles (40.234 km) was the distance of the first Japanese marathon held in 1911. Predating Kanakuri's performance, Milroy also indicated that a "professional world record" at the 25-mile distance of 2:32:42 was set by British runner Len Hurst on August 27, 1903.)

The first marathon over the official distance was won by American Johnny Hayes at the 1908 Summer Olympics, with a time of 2:55:18.4.

It is possible that Stamata Revithi, who ran the 1896 Olympic course a day after Louis, is the first woman to run the modern marathon; she is said to have finished in 5 1/2 hours. World Athletics credits Violet Piercy's 1926 performance as the first woman to race the standard marathon distance; however, other sources report that the 1918 performance of Marie-Louise Ledru in the Tour de Paris set the initial mark for women. Other "unofficial" performances have also been reported to be world bests or world records over time: although her performance is not recognized by World Athletics, Adrienne Beames from Australia is frequently credited as the first woman to break the three-hour barrier in the marathon. (Note: According to the Association of Road Racing Statisticians, Beames' performance of 2:46:30 on August 31, 1971, in Werribee, Australia is regarded as a time trial.)

In the 1953 Boston Marathon, the top three male finishers were thought to have broken the standing world record, but Keizo Yamada's mark of 2:18:51 is considered to have been set on a short course of 25.54 miles (41.1 km). The Boston Athletic Association also does not report Yamada's performance as a world best for this reason.

On October 25, 1981, American Alberto Salazar and New Zealander Allison Roe set apparent world bests at the 1981 New York City Marathon (2:08:13 and 2:25:29), however, these marks were invalidated when the course was later found to have been 151 meters short. Although World Athletics' progression notes three performances set on the same course in 1978, 1979, and 1980 by Norwegian Grete Waitz, the Association of Road Racing Statisticians considers the New York City course suspect for those performances, too.

On April 18, 2011, the Boston Marathon produced what were at that time the two fastest marathon performances in history. Winner Geoffrey Mutai of Kenya recorded a time of 2:03:02, followed by countryman Moses Mosop in 2:03:06. However, since the Boston course does not meet the criteria for record attempts (the starting line is too high relative to the finish), these times were not ratified by the IAAF.

Eight IAAF world records were set at the Polytechnic Marathon (1909, 1913, 1952–1954, 1963–1965). WA-recognized world records have been broken at all of the original five World Marathon Majors on numerous occasions (updated 09/2022); twelve times at the Berlin Marathon, three times at the Boston Marathon, five times at the Chicago Marathon, six times at the London Marathon, and five times at the New York City Marathon. However, the records established in the Boston event have been disputed on grounds of a downhill point-to-point course, while four of the five New York records have been disputed on grounds of a short course.

On April 26, 2026, Sabastian Sawe and Yomif Kejelcha became the first individuals to run a record-eligible marathon in under two hours, at the 2026 London Marathon.

== Criteria for record eligibility ==
For a performance to be ratified as a world record by World Athletics, the marathon course on which the performance occurred must be 42.195 km (26.219 mi) long, measured in a defined manner using the calibrated bicycle method (the distance in kilometers being the official distance; the distance in miles is an approximation) and meet other criteria that rule out artificially fast times produced on courses aided by downhill slope or tailwind. The criteria include:

- "The start and finish points of a course, measured along a theoretical straight line between them, shall not be further apart than 50% of the race distance."
- "The decrease in elevation between the start and finish shall not exceed an average of one in a thousand (i.e., 1m per km)."

In recognizing Kenyan Geoffrey Mutai's mark of 2:03:02 at the 2011 Boston Marathon as (at the time) "the fastest Marathon ever run", the IAAF said: "Due to the elevation drop and point-to-point measurements of the Boston course, performances [on that course] are not eligible for World record consideration."

The Association of Road Racing Statisticians, an independent organization that compiles data from road running events, also maintains an alternate marathon world best progression but with standards they consider to be more stringent.

=== Women's world record changes ===
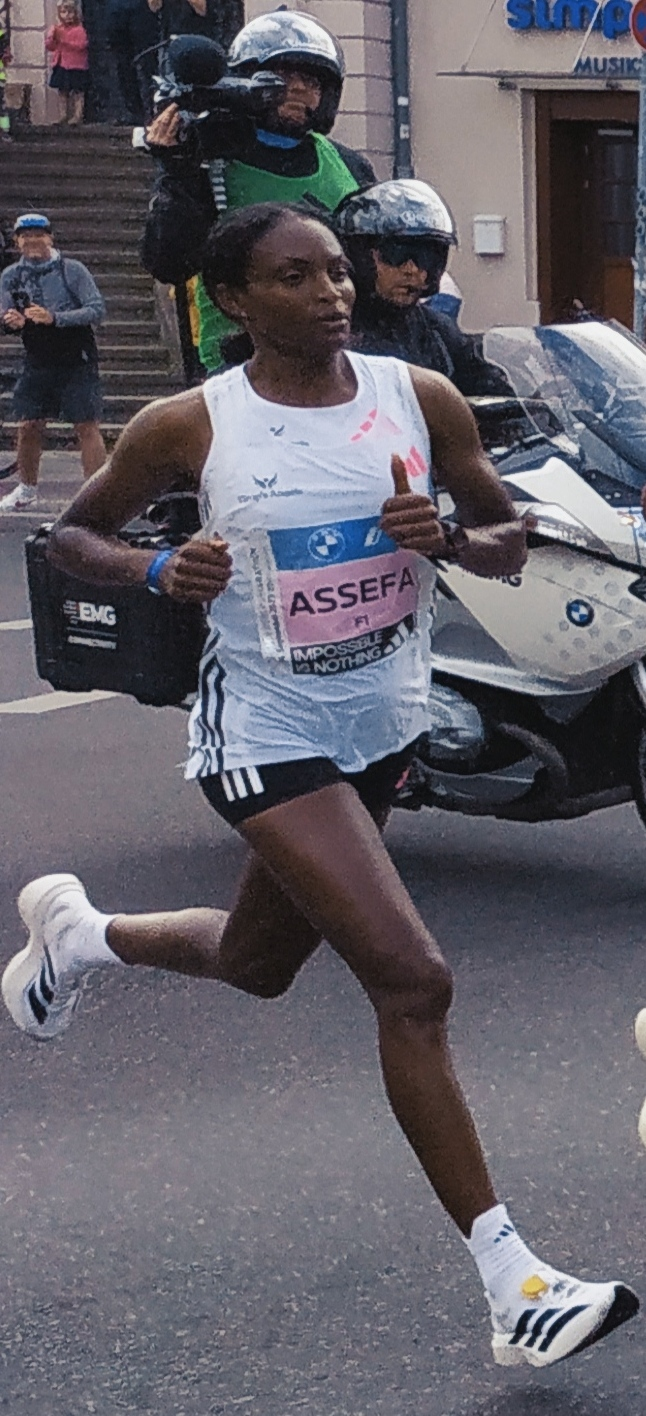
Tigst Assefa during her women's world record run at the 2023 Berlin Marathon with 2:11:53

The IAAF Congress, at the 2011 World Championships, passed a motion changing the record eligibility criteria effective October 6, 2007, so that women's world records must be set in all-women competitions. The result of the change was that Radcliffe's 2:17:42 performance at the 2005 London Marathon supplanted her own existing women's mark as the "world record"; the earlier performance is to be referred to as a "world best".

Per the 2021 IAAF Competition Rules, "a World Record for performance achieved in mixed sex ("Mixed") races and a World Record for performance achieved in single sex ("Women only") races" are tracked separately.

=== Unofficial record attempts ===
In December 2016, Nike, Inc., announced that three top distance runners—Eliud Kipchoge, Zersenay Tadese, and Lelisa Desisa—had agreed to forgo the spring marathon season to work with the company in an effort to run a sub-two-hour marathon.

The Breaking2 event took place in the early morning of May 6, 2017; Kipchoge crossed the finish line with a time of 2:00:25. This time was more than two minutes faster than the world record at the time.

Kipchoge took part in a similar attempt to break the two-hour barrier in Vienna on October 12, 2019, as part of the Ineos 1:59 Challenge. He successfully ran the first sub-two-hour marathon distance, with a time of 1:59:40.2. The effort did not count as a new world record under IAAF rules due to the setup of the challenge. Specifically, it was not an open event, Kipchoge was handed fluids by his support team throughout, the run featured a pace car, and included rotating teams of other runners pacing Kipchoge in a formation designed to reduce wind resistance and maximize efficiency. The achievement was recognized by Guinness World Records with the titles 'Fastest marathon distance (male)' and 'First marathon distance run under two hours' instead of an official world record.

=== Men ===
Table key:
Listed by World Athletics as a world best prior to official acceptance
Ratified by World Athletics as a world best (since January 1, 2003) or world record (since January 1, 2004)
Recognized by the Association of Road Racing Statisticians (ARRS)

The edition of the marathon is linked on some of the dates.

Time	Name	Nationality	Date	Event/Place	Source	Notes
2:55:18.4	Johnny Hayes	United States	July 24, 1908	London Olympics, England	IAAF	Time was officially recorded as 2:55:18 2/5. Italian Dorando Pietri finished in 2:54:46.4, but was disqualified for receiving assistance from race officials near the finish.
2:52:45.4	Robert Fowler	United States	January 1, 1909	Yonkers, (Note: Many references incorrectly refer to this race as the Yonkers Marathon. The Yonkers Marathon, which during the early 1900s was traditionally run during late November, was won over a month earlier by Jim Crowley.) United States	IAAF	
2:46:52.8	James Clark	United States	February 12, 1909	New York City, United States	IAAF	
2:46:04.6	Albert Raines	United States	May 8, 1909	New York City, United States	IAAF	
2:42:31.0	Henry Barrett	United Kingdom	May 8, 1909 (Note: According to the progression of world bests listed by the International Association of Athletics Federations (IAAF), James Clark set a world best of 2:46:52.8 in New York on February 12, 1909, Albert Raines broke Clark's mark with a 2:46:04.6 in New York on May 8, 1909, and Henry Barrett broke Raines' mark with a 2:42:31.0 in London on May 26, 1909. Ian Ridpath, a former director of the Polytechnic marathon, has indicated on his website that some sources have wrongly listed the date of Barrett performance as May 26, 1909, and has confirmed the true date as May 8, 1909. An article in The Times dated May 10, 1909, provides strong evidence that Ridpath is correct. Given that Barrett's marathon in London most likely concluded before Raines' marathon held on the same date in New York, it is also likely that Barrett rather than Raines broke the world best set by Clark three months earlier.)	Polytechnic Marathon, London, England	IAAF	
2:40:34.2	Thure Johansson	Sweden	August 31, 1909	Stockholm, Sweden	IAAF	
2:38:16.2	Harry Green	United Kingdom	May 12, 1913	Polytechnic Marathon	IAAF	
2:36:06.6	Alexis Ahlgren	Sweden	May 31, 1913	Polytechnic Marathon	IAAF	Report in The Times claiming world record.
2:38:00.8	Umberto Blasi	Italy	November 29, 1914	Legnano, Italy	ARRS	
2:32:35.8	Hannes Kolehmainen	Finland	August 22, 1920	Antwerp Olympics, Belgium	IAAF, ARRS	The course distance was officially reported to be 42,750 meters/26.56 miles, however, the Association of Road Racing Statisticians estimated the course to be 40 km.
2:29:01.8	Albert Michelsen	United States	October 12, 1925	Port Chester Marathon, United States	IAAF	
2:30:57.6	Harry Payne	United Kingdom	July 5, 1929	AAA Championships, London, England	ARRS	
2:26:14	Sohn Kee-chung	Japanese Korea	March 21, 1935	Tokyo, Japan	ARRS	Also romanized as Kitei Son.
2:27:49.0	Fusashige Suzuki	Japan	March 31, 1935	Tokyo, Japan	IAAF	According to the Association of Road Racing Statisticians, Suzuki's 2:27:49 performance occurred in Tokyo on March 21, 1935, during a race in which he finished second to Sohn Kee-chung (sometimes referred to as Kee-Jung Sohn or Son Kitei) who ran a 2:26:14.
2:26:44.0	Yasuo Ikenaka	Japan	April 3, 1935	Tokyo, Japan	IAAF	
2:26:42	Sohn Kee-chung	Japanese Korea	November 3, 1935	Meiji Shrine Games, Tokyo, Japan	IAAF	Also romanized as Kitei Son.
2:25:39	Suh Yun-bok	Korea	April 19, 1947	Boston Marathon	IAAF	Disputed (short course). Disputed (point-to-point).
2:20:42.2	Jim Peters	United Kingdom	June 14, 1952	Polytechnic Marathon	IAAF, ARRS	MarathonGuide.com states the course was slightly long. Report in The Times claiming world record.
2:18:40.4	Jim Peters	United Kingdom	June 13, 1953	Polytechnic Marathon	IAAF, ARRS	Report in The Times claiming world record.
2:18:34.8	Jim Peters	United Kingdom	October 4, 1953	Turku Marathon	IAAF, ARRS	
2:17:39.4	Jim Peters	United Kingdom	June 26, 1954	Polytechnic Marathon	IAAF	Point-to-point course. Report in The Times claiming world record.
2:18:04.8	Paavo Kotila	Finland	August 12, 1956	Finnish Athletics Championships, Pieksämäki, Finland	ARRS	
2:15:17.0	Sergei Popov	Soviet Union	August 24, 1958	European Athletics Championships, Stockholm, Sweden	IAAF, ARRS	The ARRS notes Popov's extended time as 2:15:17.6
2:15:16.2	Abebe Bikila	Ethiopia	September 10, 1960	Rome Olympics, Italy	IAAF, ARRS	World record fastest marathon run in bare feet.
2:15:15.8	Toru Terasawa	Japan	February 17, 1963	Beppu-Ōita Marathon	IAAF, ARRS	
2:14:28	Leonard Edelen	United States	June 15, 1963	Polytechnic Marathon	IAAF	Point-to-point course. Report in The Times claiming world record and stating that the course may have been long.
2:14:43	Brian Kilby	United Kingdom	July 6, 1963	Port Talbot, Wales	ARRS	
2:13:55	Basil Heatley	United Kingdom	June 13, 1964	Polytechnic Marathon	IAAF	Point-to-point course. Report in The Times claiming world record.
2:12:11.2	Abebe Bikila	Ethiopia	October 21, 1964	Tokyo Olympics, Japan	IAAF, ARRS	
2:12:00	Morio Shigematsu	Japan	June 12, 1965	Polytechnic Marathon	IAAF	Point-to-point course. Report in The Times claiming world record.
2:09:36.4	Derek Clayton	Australia	December 3, 1967	Fukuoka Marathon	IAAF, ARRS	
2:08:33.6	Derek Clayton	Australia	May 30, 1969	Antwerp, Belgium	IAAF	Disputed (short course).
2:09:28.8	Ron Hill	United Kingdom	July 23, 1970	Edinburgh Commonwealth Games, Scotland	ARRS	
2:09:12	Ian Thompson	United Kingdom	January 31, 1974	Christchurch Commonwealth Games, New Zealand	ARRS	
2:09:05.6	Shigeru So	Japan	February 5, 1978	Beppu-Ōita Marathon	ARRS	
2:09:01	Gerard Nijboer	Netherlands	April 26, 1980	Amsterdam Marathon	ARRS	
2:08:18	Robert de Castella	Australia	December 6, 1981	Fukuoka Marathon	IAAF, ARRS	
2:08:05	Steve Jones	United Kingdom	October 21, 1984	Chicago Marathon	IAAF, ARRS	
2:07:12	Carlos Lopes	Portugal	April 20, 1985	Rotterdam Marathon	IAAF, ARRS	
2:06:50	Belayneh Dinsamo	Ethiopia	April 17, 1988	Rotterdam Marathon	IAAF, ARRS	
2:06:05	Ronaldo da Costa	Brazil	September 20, 1998	Berlin Marathon	IAAF, ARRS	First time the 40K mark was passed under two hours (1:59:55).
2:05:42	Khalid Khannouchi	Morocco	October 24, 1999	Chicago Marathon	IAAF, ARRS	
2:05:38	Khalid Khannouchi	United States	April 14, 2002	London Marathon	IAAF, ARRS	First "World's Best" recognized by the International Association of Athletics Federations. The ARRS notes Khannouchi's extended time as 2:05:37.8
2:04:55	Paul Tergat	Kenya	September 28, 2003	Berlin Marathon	IAAF, ARRS	First world record for the men's marathon ratified by the International Association of Athletics Federations.
2:04:26	Haile Gebrselassie	Ethiopia	September 30, 2007	Berlin Marathon	IAAF, ARRS	
2:03:59	Haile Gebrselassie	Ethiopia	September 28, 2008	Berlin Marathon	IAAF, ARRS	The ARRS notes Gebrselassie's extended time as 2:03:58.2. Video on YouTube
2:03:38	Patrick Makau	Kenya	September 25, 2011	Berlin Marathon	IAAF, ARRS	
2:03:23	Wilson Kipsang	Kenya	September 29, 2013	Berlin Marathon	IAAF ARRS	The ARRS notes Kipsang's extended time as 2:03:22.2
2:02:57	Dennis Kimetto	Kenya	September 28, 2014	Berlin Marathon	IAAF ARRS	The ARRS notes Kimetto's extended time as 2:02:56.4
2:01:39	Eliud Kipchoge	Kenya	September 16, 2018	Berlin Marathon	IAAF	
2:01:09	Eliud Kipchoge	Kenya	September 25, 2022	Berlin Marathon	World Athletics	
2:00:35	Kelvin Kiptum	Kenya	October 8, 2023	Chicago Marathon	World Athletics	
1:59:30	Sabastian Sawe	Kenya	April 26, 2026	London Marathon	World Athletics	First man to break 2:00:00 in a record-eligible marathon (Note: Second place Yomif Kejelcha also broke 2:00:00 when finishing 11 seconds later.)

=== Women ===
Table key:
Listed by World Athletics as a world best prior to official acceptance
Ratified by World Athletics as a world best (since January 1, 2003) or world record (since January 1, 2004)
Recognized by the Association of Road Racing Statisticians (ARRS)

Time	Name	Nationality	Date	Event/Place	Source	Notes
5:40:00	Marie-Louise Ledru	France	September 29, 1918	Tour de Paris Marathon	ARRS	
3:40:22	Violet Piercy	United Kingdom	October 3, 1926	London (Note: Piercy's mark was set on the Polytechnic Marathon course between Windsor and London. A number of sources, including Kathrine Switzer, have reported that the venue for Piercy's mark was the actual Polytechnic Marathon, however, records from the Association of Road Racing Statisticians confirm that the 1926 Polytechnic Marathon was held on May 18.)	IAAF	The ARRS indicates that Piercy's 3:40:22 was set on August 2, 1926, during a time trial on a course that was only 35.4 km.
3:37:07	Merry Lepper	United States	December 16, 1963 (Note: The Association of Road Racing Statisticians notes the date of the race as December 14, 1963.)	Culver City, United States	IAAF	Disputed (short course).
3:27:45	Dale Greig	United Kingdom	May 23, 1964	Ryde	IAAF, ARRS	
3:19:33	Mildred Sampson	New Zealand	July 21, 1964 (Note: Peter Heidenstrom, a statistician for Athletics New Zealand, has been reported as providing a date of December 1964, however, the Association of Road Racing Statisticians notes the date of Sampson's performance was August 16, 1964. Other sources from August to October 1964 support the August date. The ARRS also notes that Sampson's mark was set during a time trial and does not recognize it in their progression of marathon world bests.)	Auckland, New Zealand	IAAF	Disputed by ARRS as a time trial.
3:14:23	Maureen Wilton	Canada	May 6, 1967	Toronto, Canada	IAAF, ARRS	The ARRS notes Wilton's extended time as 3:14:22.8
3:07:27.2	Anni Pede-Erdkamp	West Germany	September 16, 1967	Waldniel, West Germany	IAAF, ARRS	The ARRS notes Pede-Erdkamp's extended time as 3:07:26.2
3:02:53	Caroline Walker	United States	February 28, 1970	Seaside, OR	IAAF, ARRS	
3:01:42	Elizabeth Bonner	United States	May 9, 1971	Philadelphia, United States	IAAF, ARRS	
2:55:22	Elizabeth Bonner	United States	September 19, 1971	New York City Marathon	IAAF, ARRS	
2:49:40	Cheryl Bridges	United States	December 5, 1971	Culver City, United States	IAAF, ARRS	
2:46:36	Michiko Gorman	United States	December 2, 1973	Culver City, United States	IAAF, ARRS	The ARRS notes Gorman's extended time as 2:46:37
2:46:24	Chantal Langlacé	France	October 27, 1974	Neuf-Brisach, France	IAAF, ARRS	
2:43:54.5	Jacqueline Hansen	United States	December 1, 1974	Culver City, United States	IAAF, ARRS	The ARRS notes Hansen's extended time as 2:43:54.6
2:42:24	Liane Winter	West Germany	April 21, 1975	Boston Marathon	IAAF	Disputed (point-to-point).
2:40:15.8	Christa Vahlensieck	West Germany	May 3, 1975	Dülmen	IAAF, ARRS	
2:38:19	Jacqueline Hansen	United States	October 12, 1975	Nike OTC Marathon, Eugene, United States	IAAF, ARRS	
2:35:15.4	Chantal Langlacé	France	May 1, 1977	Oiartzun, Spain	IAAF	
2:34:47.5	Christa Vahlensieck	West Germany	September 10, 1977	Berlin Marathon	IAAF, ARRS	
2:32:29.8	Grete Waitz	Norway	October 22, 1978	New York City Marathon	IAAF	Disputed (short course).
2:27:32.6	Grete Waitz	Norway	October 21, 1979	New York City Marathon	IAAF	Disputed (short course).
2:31:23	Joan Benoit	United States	February 3, 1980	Auckland, New Zealand	ARRS	
2:30:57.1	Patti Catalano	United States	September 6, 1980	Montreal, Canada	ARRS	
2:25:41.3	Grete Waitz	Norway	October 26, 1980	New York City Marathon	IAAF	Disputed (short course).
2:30:27	Joyce Smith	United Kingdom	November 16, 1980	Tokyo, Japan	ARRS	
2:29:57	Joyce Smith	United Kingdom	March 29, 1981	London Marathon	ARRS	
2:25:28	Allison Roe	New Zealand	October 25, 1981	New York City Marathon	IAAF	Disputed (short course).
2:29:01.6	Charlotte Teske	West Germany	January 16, 1982	Miami, United States	ARRS	
2:26:12	Joan Benoit	United States	September 12, 1982	Nike OTC Marathon, Eugene, United States	ARRS	
2:25:28.7	Grete Waitz	Norway	April 17, 1983	London Marathon	IAAF, ARRS	
2:22:43	Joan Benoit	United States	April 18, 1983	Boston Marathon	IAAF	Disputed (point-to-point).
2:24:26	Ingrid Kristiansen	Norway	May 13, 1984	London Marathon	ARRS	
2:21:06	Ingrid Kristiansen	Norway	April 21, 1985	London Marathon	IAAF, ARRS	
2:20:47	Tegla Loroupe	Kenya	April 19, 1998	Rotterdam Marathon	IAAF, ARRS	
2:20:43	Tegla Loroupe	Kenya	September 26, 1999	Berlin Marathon	IAAF, ARRS	
2:19:46	Naoko Takahashi	Japan	September 30, 2001	Berlin Marathon	IAAF, ARRS	
2:18:47	Catherine Ndereba	Kenya	October 7, 2001	Chicago Marathon	IAAF, ARRS	
2:17:18	Paula Radcliffe	United Kingdom	October 13, 2002	Chicago Marathon	IAAF, ARRS	First "World's Best" recognized by the International Association of Athletics Federations. The ARRS notes Radcliffe's extended time as 2:17:17.7
2:15:25 Mx	Paula Radcliffe	United Kingdom	April 13, 2003	London Marathon	IAAF, ARRS	First world record for the women's marathon ratified by the International Association of Athletics Federations. The ARRS notes Radcliffe's extended time as 2:15:24.6
2:17:42 Wo	Paula Radcliffe	Great Britain	April 17, 2005	London Marathon	IAAF	
2:17:01 Wo	Mary Jepkosgei Keitany	Kenya	April 23, 2017	London Marathon	IAAF	
2:14:04 Mx	Brigid Kosgei	Kenya	October 13, 2019	Chicago Marathon	IAAF	
2:11:53 Mx	Tigst Assefa	Ethiopia	September 24, 2023	Berlin Marathon	World Athletics	First woman to break the 2:12:00 barrier in the marathon.
2:16:16 Wo	Peres Jepchirchir	Kenya	April 21, 2024	London Marathon	World Athletics	
2:09:56 Mx	Ruth Chepng'etich	Kenya	October 13, 2024	Chicago Marathon	World Athletics	First woman to break the 2:11:00 and 2:10:00 barriers in the marathon. Chepng'etich was banned on 23 October 2025 for three years for the presence and use of hydrochlorothiazide, though achievements and records pre-dating the 14 March 2025 sample stand.
2:15:50 Wo	Tigst Assefa	Ethiopia	April 27, 2025	London Marathon	World Athletics	
2:15:41 Wo	Tigst Assefa	Ethiopia	April 26, 2026	London Marathon	World Athletics	

== Gallery of world record holders ==
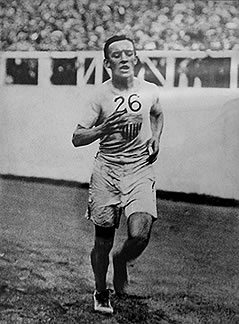
Johnny Hayes

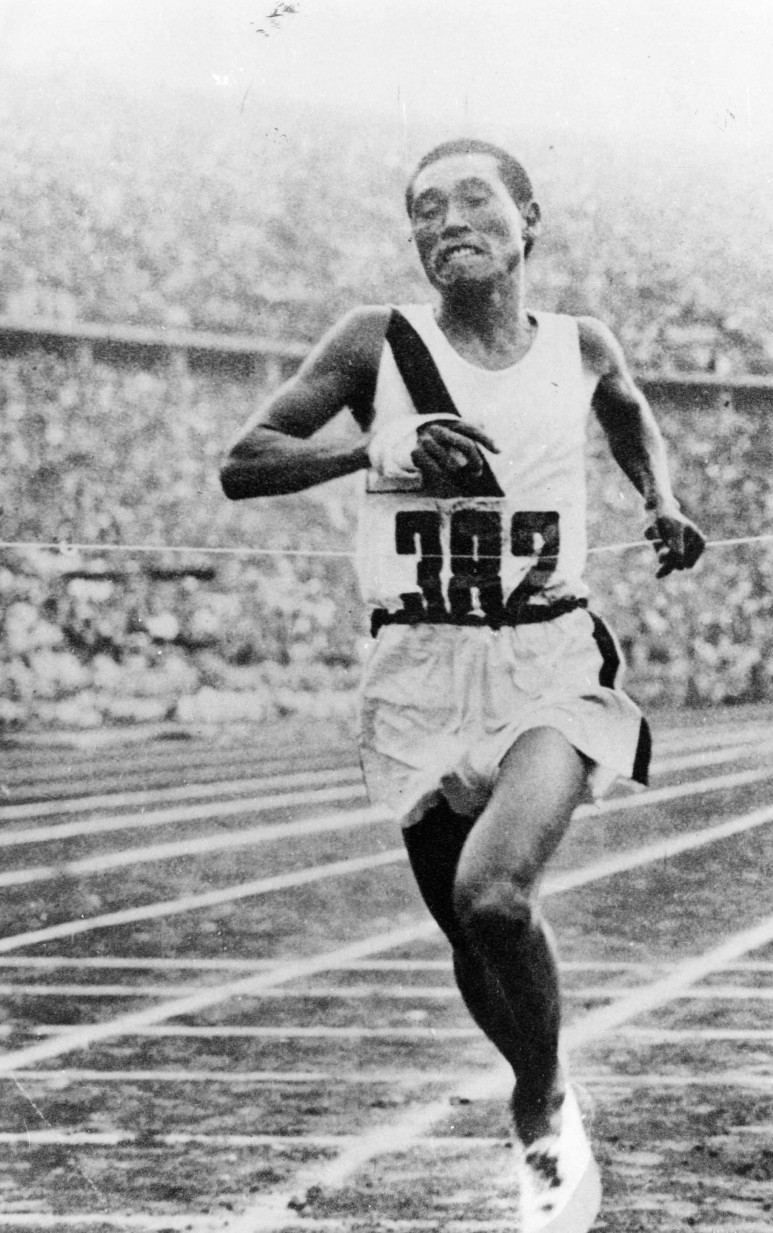
Sohn Kee-chung

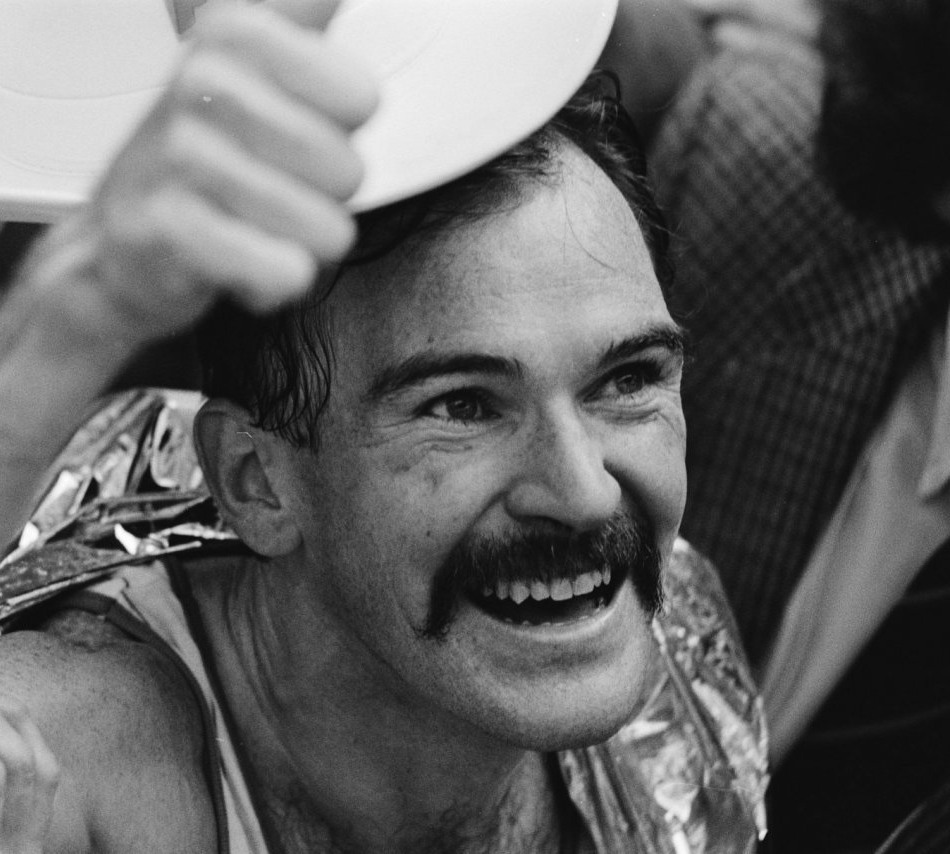
Robert de Castella

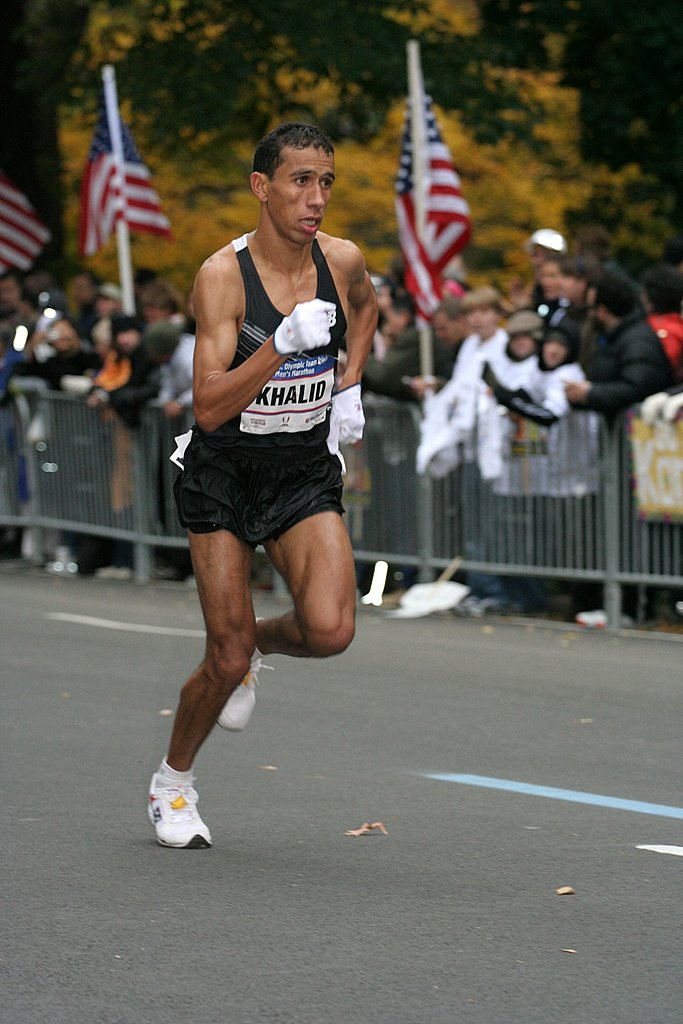
Khalid Khannouchi

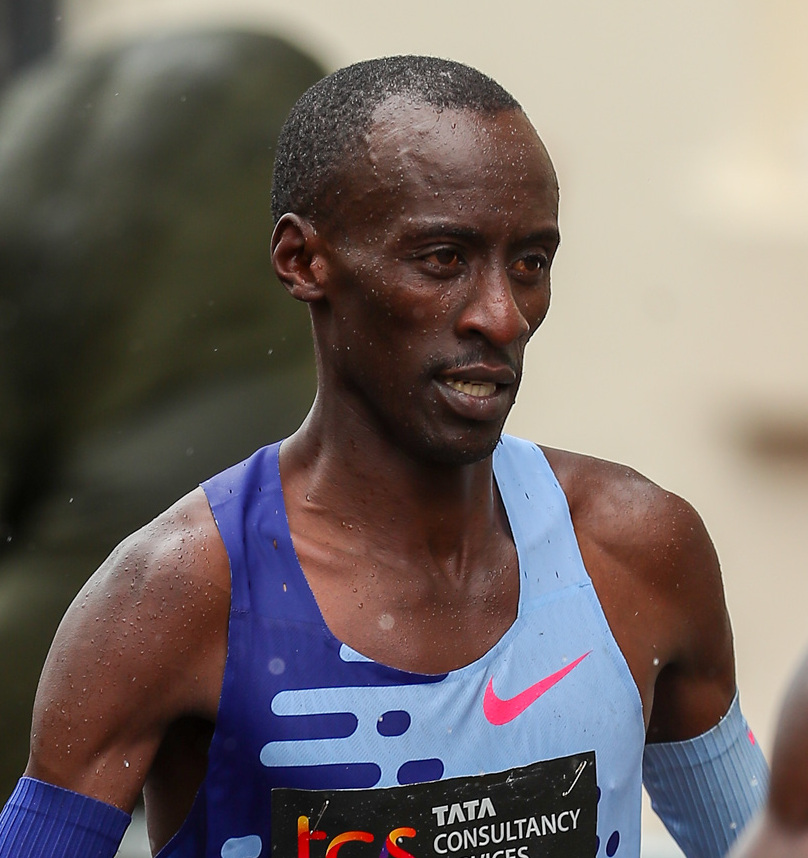
Kelvin Kiptum

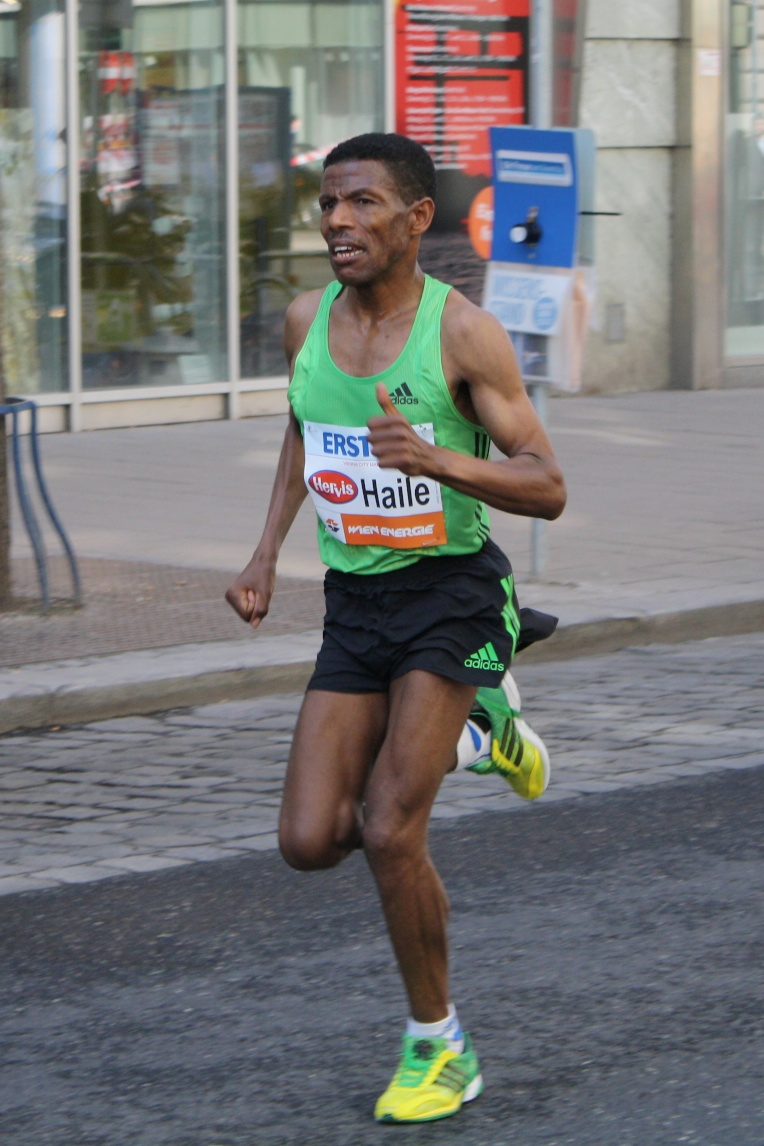
Haile Gebrselassie

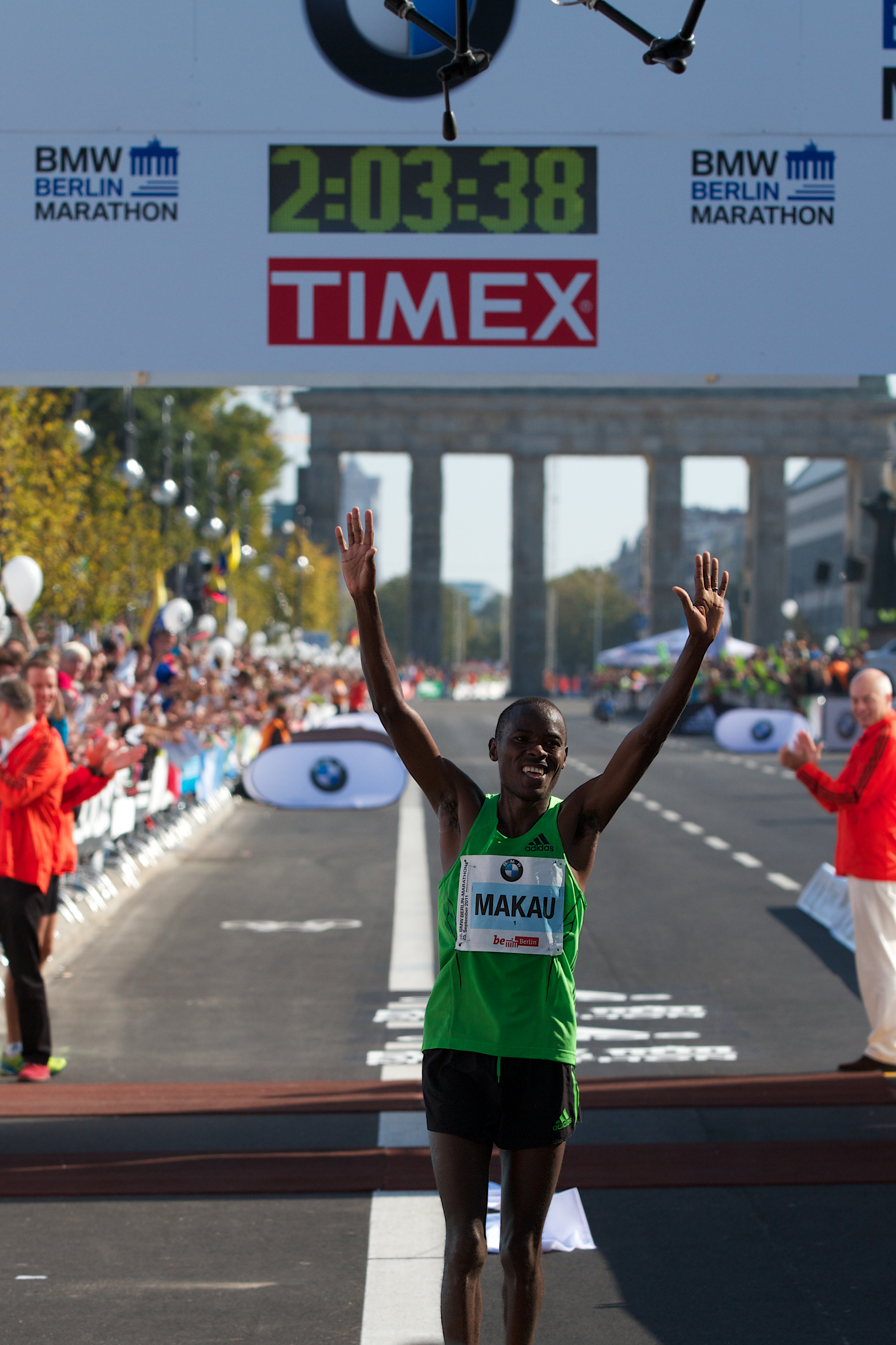
Patrick Makau

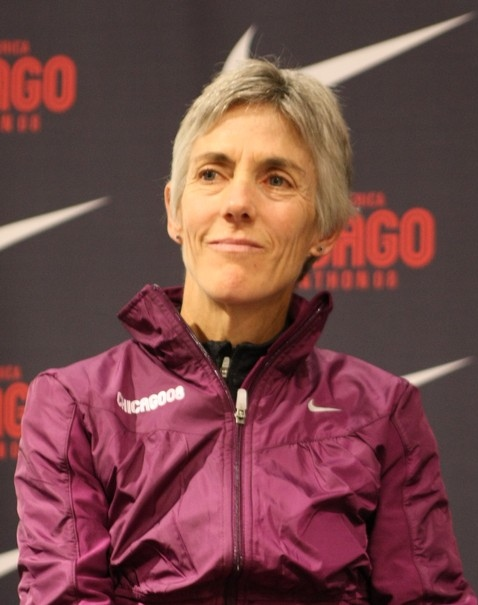
Joan Benoit

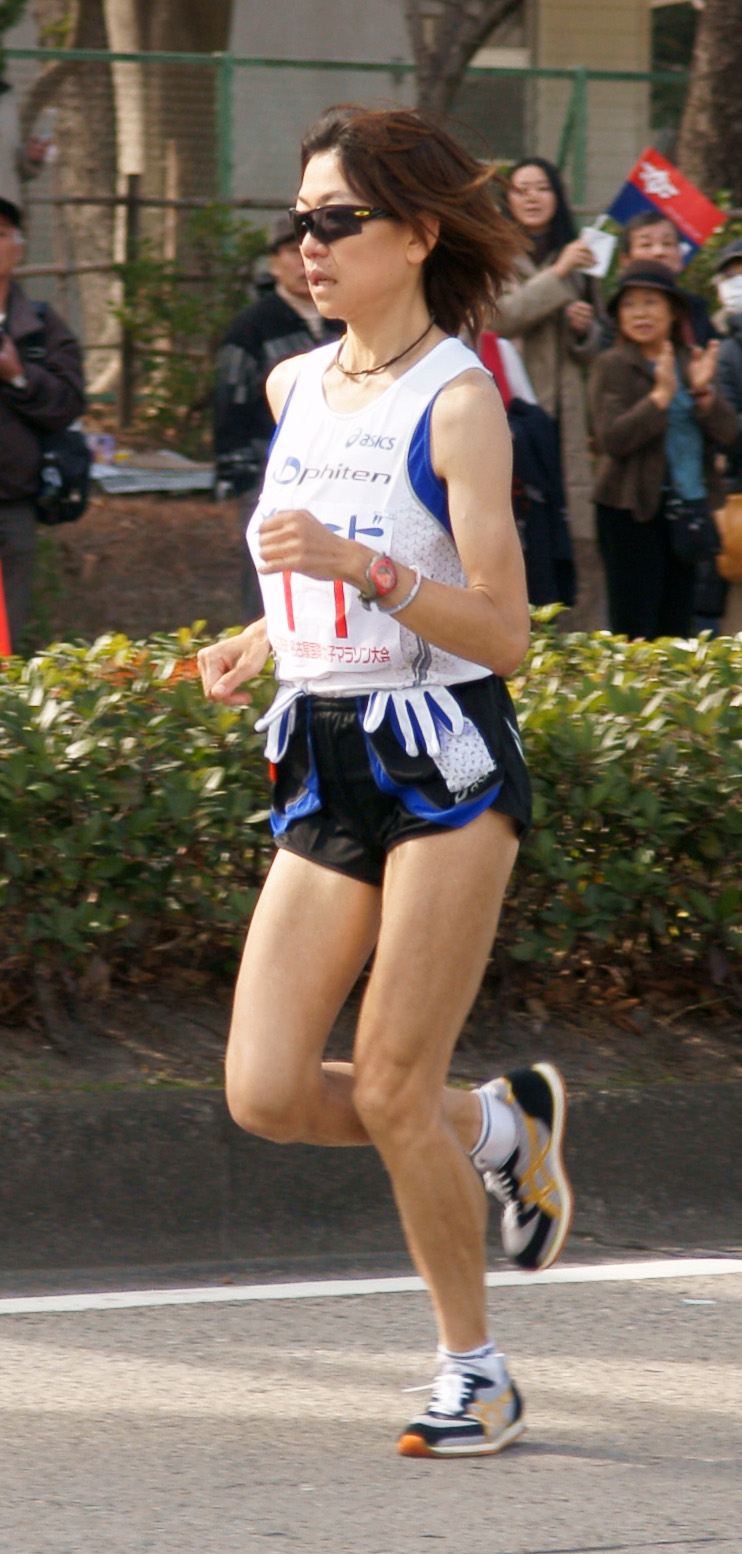
Naoko Takahashi

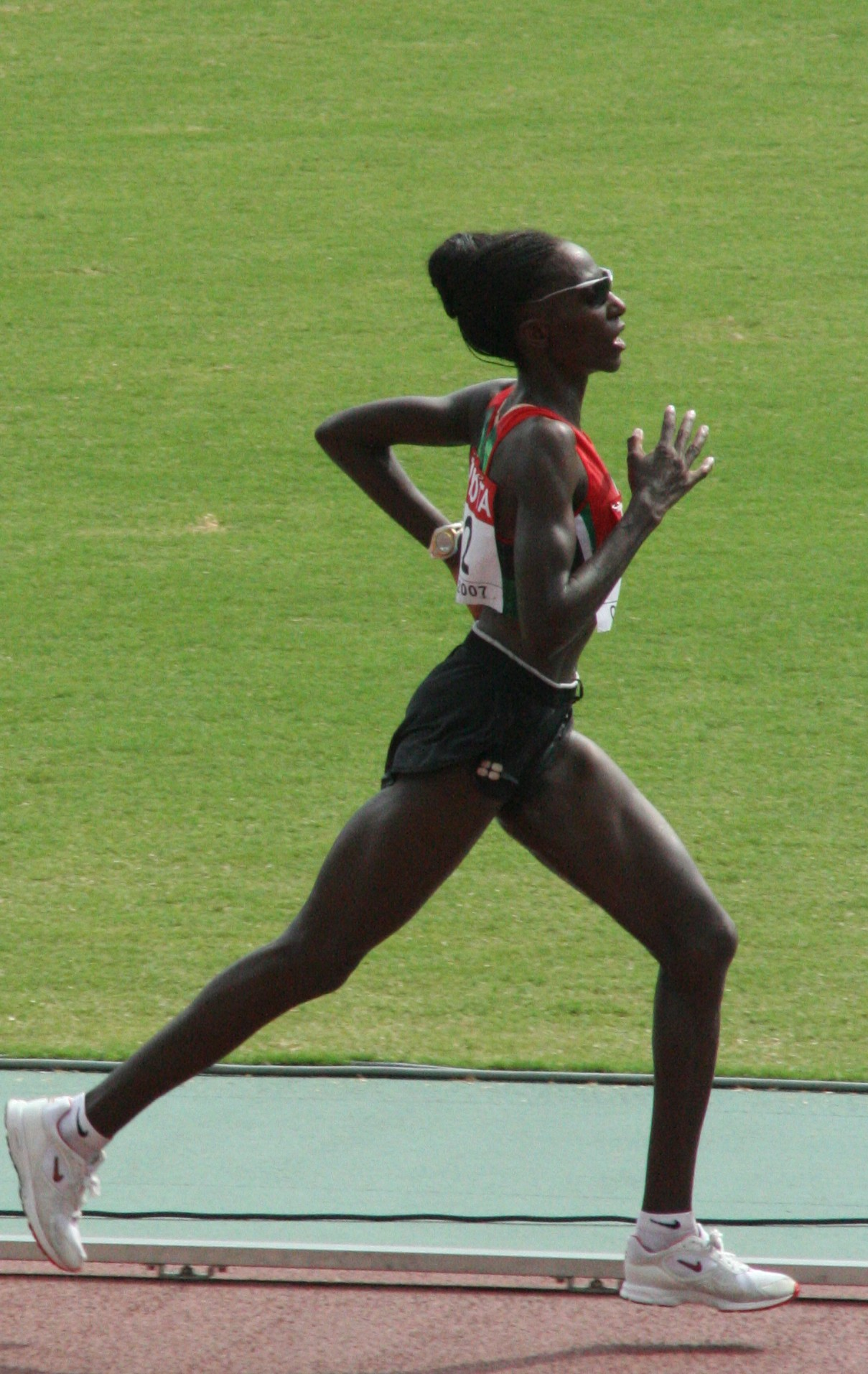
Catherine Ndereba

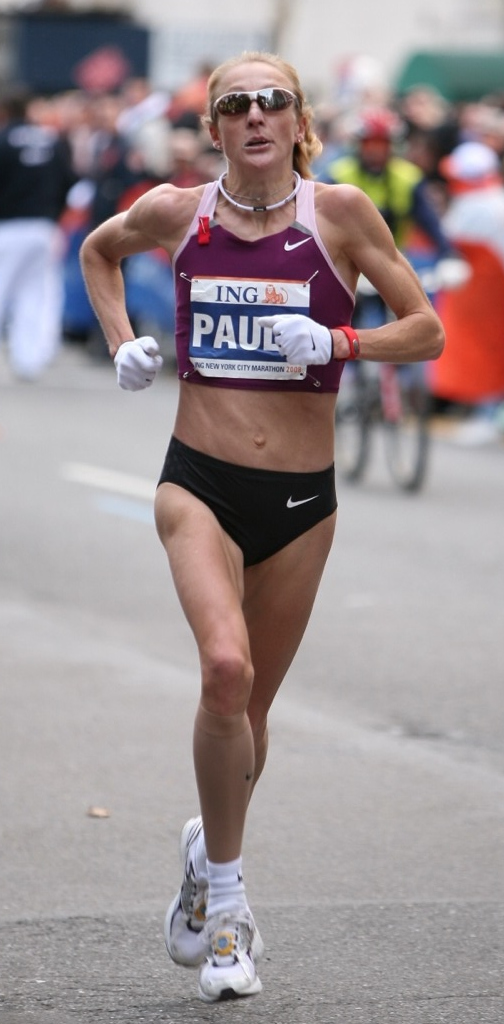
Paula Radcliffe

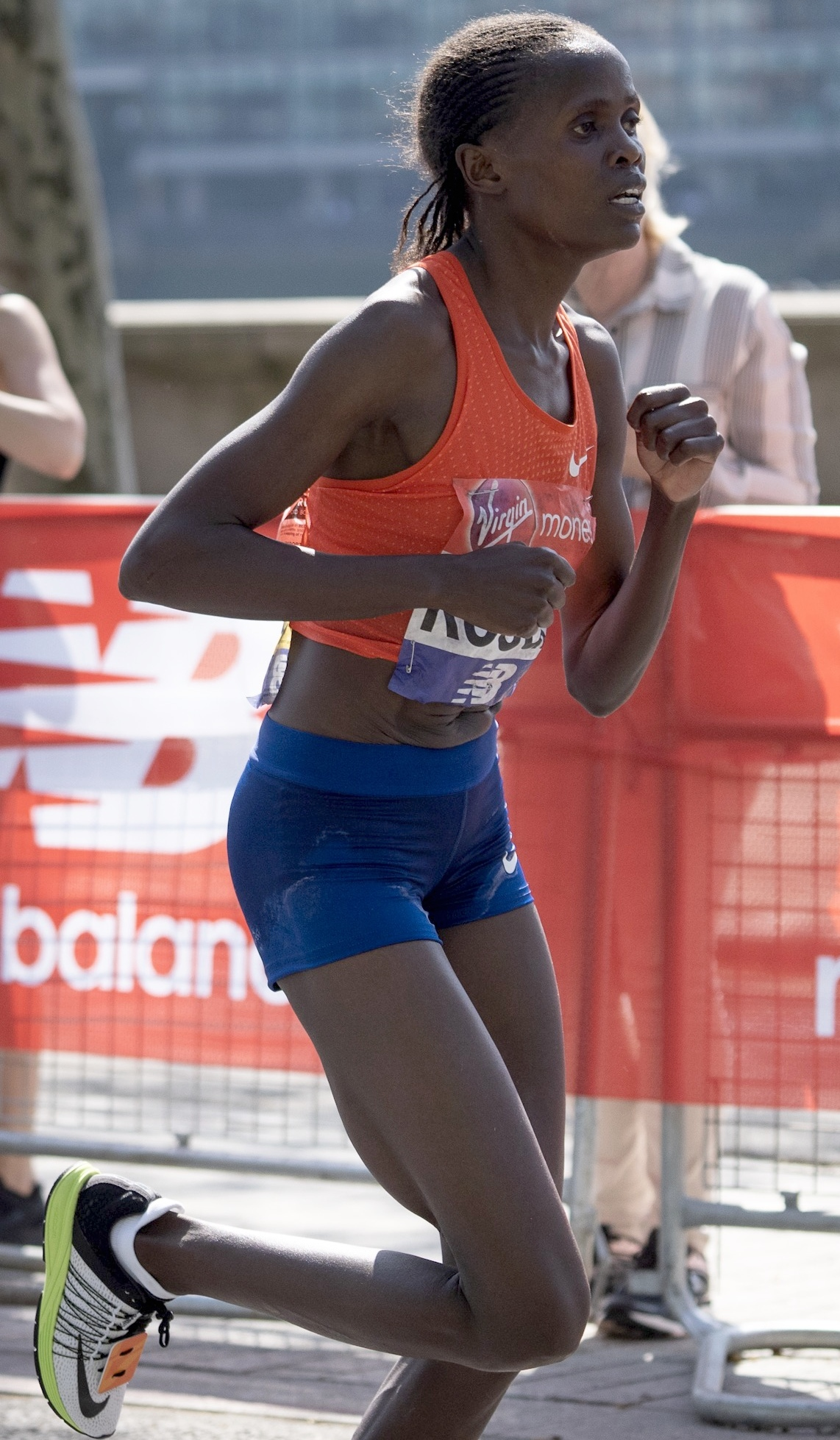
Brigid Kosgei

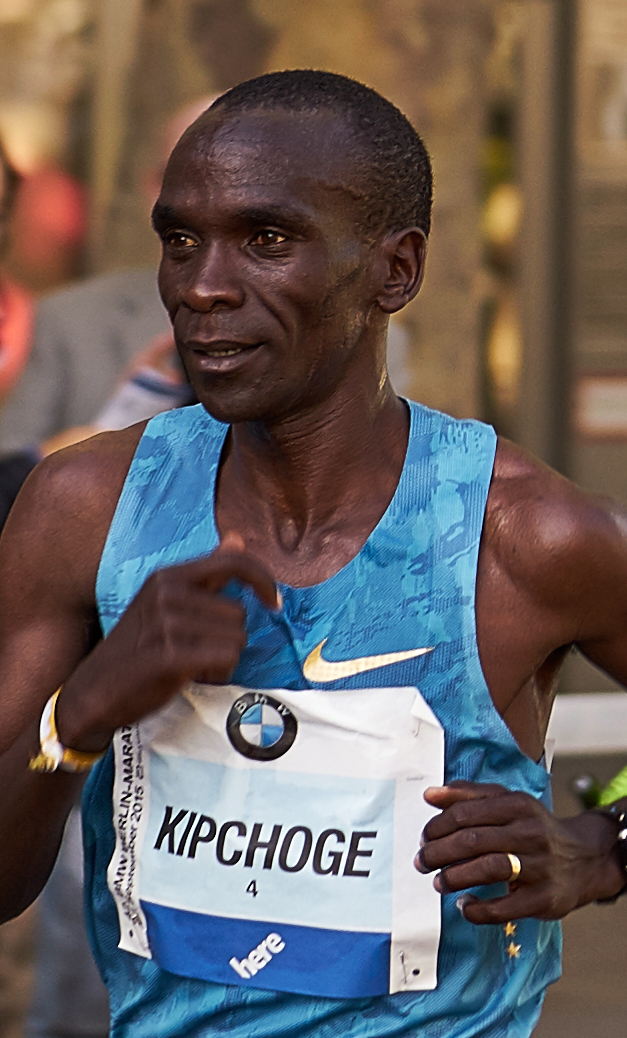
Eliud Kipchoge

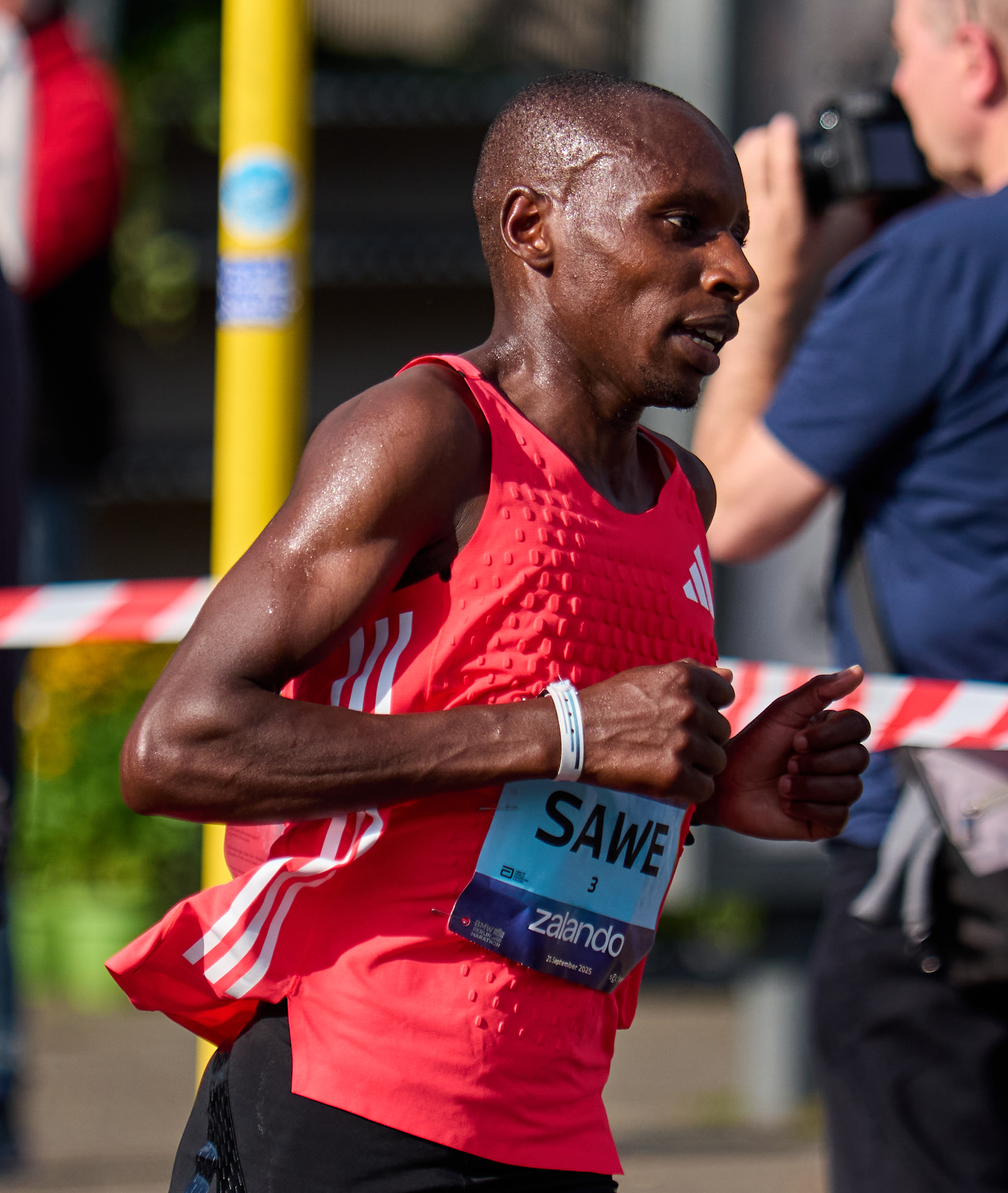
Sabastian Sawe

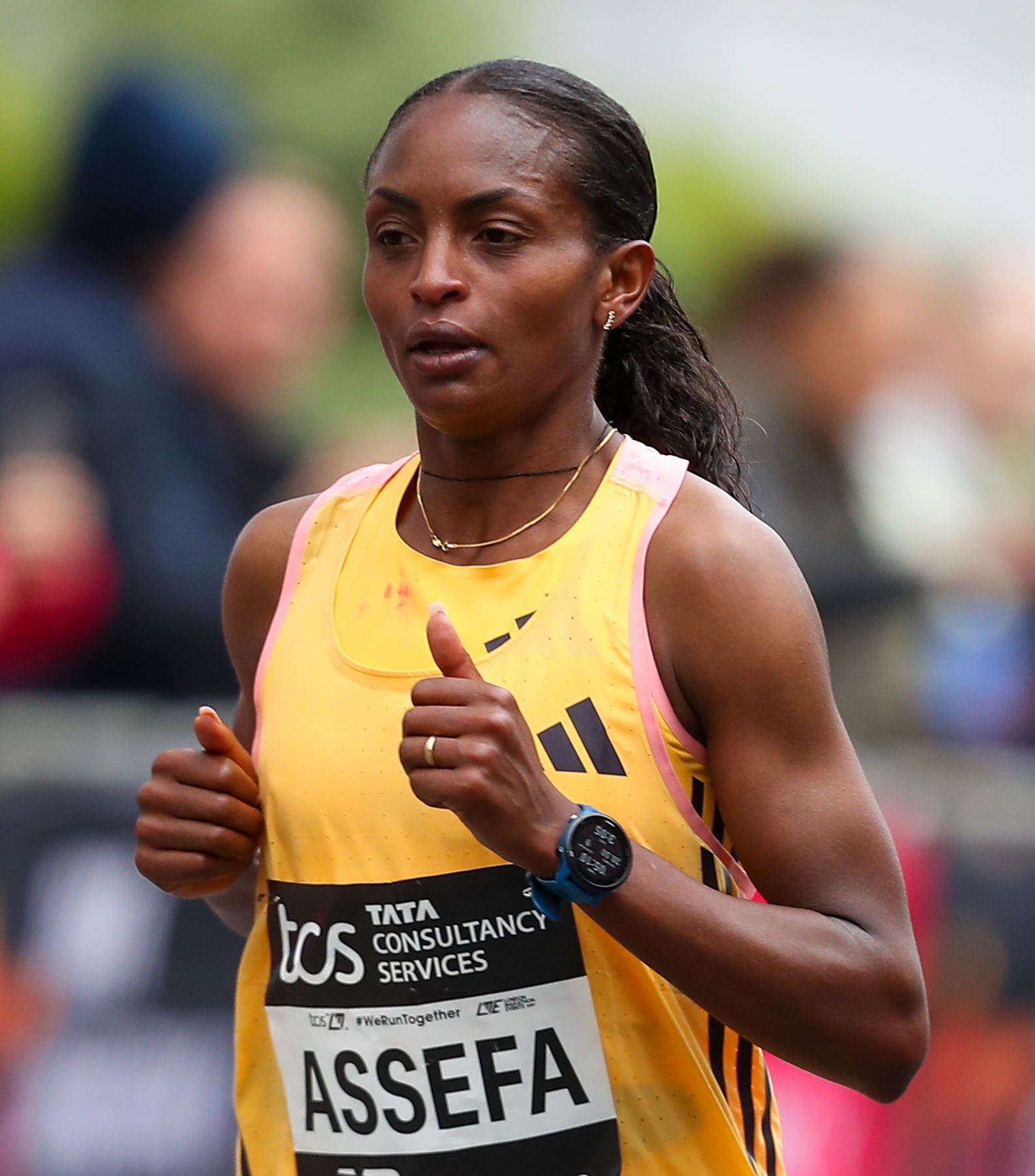
Tigst Assefa

== See also ==
- Marathon year rankings
- National records in the marathon
- Men's marathon Italian record progression

Men's Masters Records

- Masters M35 marathon world record progression
- Masters M40 marathon world record progression
- Masters M45 marathon world record progression
- Masters M50 marathon world record progression
- Masters M55 marathon world record progression
- Masters M60 marathon world record progression
- Masters M65 marathon world record progression
- Masters M70 marathon world record progression
- Masters M75 marathon world record progression
- Masters M80 marathon world record progression
- Masters M85 marathon world record progression
- Masters M90 marathon world record progression

Women's Masters Records

- Masters W35 marathon world record progression
- Masters W40 marathon world record progression
- Masters W45 marathon world record progression
- Masters W50 marathon world record progression
- Masters W55 marathon world record progression
- Masters W60 marathon world record progression
- Masters W65 marathon world record progression
- Masters W70 marathon world record progression
- Masters W75 marathon world record progression
- Masters W80 marathon world record progression
- Masters W85 marathon world record progression
- Masters W90 marathon world record progression

== Sources ==
- "untitled". ARRS. Archived from the original on December 15, 2018.
- Butler, Mark, ed. (2011). 13th IAAF World Championships in Athletics – IAAF Statistics Handbook – Daegu 2011 (PDF). Part 5 (of 5). IAAF Media & Public Relations Department. pp. 595, 612, 614–615, 705, 707. Archived (PDF) from the original on October 3, 2020.
