= Adrienne Beames =

Australian long-distance runner

Adrienne Beames (7 September 1942, Victoria, Australia – 27 December 2018) was an Australian long-distance runner frequently credited as the first woman to break the 3-hour barrier in the marathon.

== 1971 marathon attempt ==
In the early 1970s, women's marathoning was met with deep hostility; the 1500 metres was the longest track event officially recognised for women. When Beames' attempts to officially enter a marathon were thwarted, she and her coach, Fred Warwick, organised an invitational event to be run over a certified course in Werribee. Despite Warwick's request, the now defunct Victorian Women's Amateur Athletic Association refused to time the event.

On 31 August 1971, Warwick claimed that Beames had run a 2:46:30 in Werribee, Victoria, Australia, shattering the previous women's world best of 3:01:42 set three months earlier by American Beth Bonner at the AAU Eastern Regional Championships in Philadelphia. According to some sources, this mark stood until 27 October 1974 when Chantal Langlacé ran 2:46:24 in Neuf-Brisach, France. Some sources question the validity of Beames' run and indicate that it was Bonner who actually first broke three hours with a 2:55:22 at the New York City Marathon on 19 September 1971. John Craven, a sports writer reporting on the story at the time, questioned whether the course was the required distance.

Dismissed by the press as a "time trial", Beames performance was not officially verified or recognised. The International Association of Athletics Federations, the international governing body for the sport of athletics, does not recognise the mark in their progression for the marathon world best.

== 1972 record claims ==
During January 1972, her coach, Fred Warwick, announced a series of private time trials that she had completed, claiming several world records: 15:48.6 for 5,000m, 4:28.8 for the mile, 4:09.6 for 1,500m, and 34:08 for 10,000m. None of these had independent observers, and have been treated with suspicion.

== Olympic selection controversy ==
Beames was suspended by local officials in Sydney when she entered a race without their permission, thereby ending her hopes of competing in the 1972 Munich Olympics. In the 1970s, she moved to the United States where she studied, worked, and competed on the American road racing circuit. By 1973, Beames held women's world bests in the 5000 and 10000 as well as the marathon. Beames posted an official 2:46:32 at a marathon in Scottsdale, Arizona on 10 December 1977; however, she was disqualified for course cutting. She won the inaugural Asics Half Marathon with a 1:22:15 on 23 July 1983.

== Personal life ==
Beames was the daughter of Australian rules footballer, first-class cricketer, and journalist Percy Beames. She excelled in tennis and squash before taking up running. In 1990, she earned a graduate diploma in sports science.
