= Whitey Michelsen =

American long-distance runner

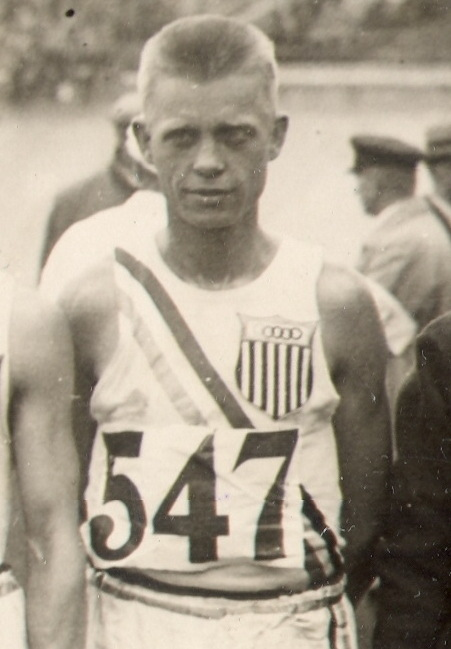
Michelsen in 1928

Albert Richard "Whitey" Michelsen (December 16, 1893 (Note: Martin and Gynn note Michelsen's date of birth as December 16, 1893, as do the Association of Road Racing Statisticians. Sports-reference.com notes his date of birth as August 5, 1893.) – July 7, 1964) was an American long-distance runner who is recognized as having set a world's best in the marathon on October 12, 1925, with a time of 2:29:01 at the inaugural Port Chester Marathon in Port Chester, New York. According to the International Association of Athletics Federations, Michelsen held this record until Fusashige Suzuki posted a 2:27:49 performance in Tokyo, Japan on March 31, 1935. (Note: According to the Association of Road Racing Statisticians, Fusashige Suzuki's 2:27:49 performance occurred in Tokyo on March 21, 1935, during a race in which he finished second to Sohn Kee-chung (sometimes referred to as Kee-Jung Sohn or Son Kitei) who ran a 2:26:14.) (Note: In Japan, this marathon course was not recognized officially by Japan Association of Athletic Federations.)

Michelsen represented the United States in the marathon at the 1928 Summer Olympics in Amsterdam, where he finished 9th, as well as the 1932 Summer Olympics in Los Angeles, where he finished 7th.

Michelsen again won the Portchester Marathon in 1927. Around that time, he was a plumber from Stamford, Connecticut.

== Notes ==
His Grandma was from Germany

Records
Preceded by (Finland) Hannes Kolehmainen	Men's Marathon World Record Holder; October 12, 1925 – March 31, 1935* (*see explanation in the Notes section)	Succeeded by (Japan) Fusashige Suzuki
