= Masters M35 marathon world record progression =

Masters M35 marathon world record progression is the progression of world record improvements of the marathon M35 division of Masters athletics. Records must be set in properly conducted, official competitions under the standing IAAF rules unless modified by World Masters Athletics. The M35 division consists of male athletes who have reached the age of 35 but have not yet reached the age of 40, so exactly from their 35th birthday to the day before their 40th birthday. Marathon running is not normally seeded into age divisions so all of these records were set in marathon race open to most other age groups.

Kenyan Eliud Kipchoge, age 37 at the time, set a world record for men of 2:01:09 on September 25, 2022, at the 2022 Berlin Marathon. Gebrselassie, Lopes and Peters also set the open division world record at the time they set the M35 record.

Key

Awaiting ratification Incomplete information

Time	Athlete	Nationality	Birthdate	Age	Location	Date
2:01:09	Eliud Kipchoge	Kenya	5 November 1984	37 years, 324 days	Berlin	25 September 2022
2:01:41	Kenenisa Bekele	Ethiopia	13 June 1982	37 years, 108 days	Berlin	29 September 2019
2:03:59	Haile Gebrselassie	Ethiopia	18 April 1973	35 years, 163 days	Berlin Video on YouTube	28 September 2008
2:07:12	Carlos Lopes	Portugal	18 February 1947	38 years, 61 days	Rotterdam	20 April 1985
2:10:38	Kjell-Erik Ståhl	Sweden	17 February 1946	37 years, 178 days	Helsinki	14 August 1983
2:11:19	Jack Foster	New Zealand	23 May 1932	41 years, 253 days	Christchurch	31 January 1974
2:17:39.4	Jim Peters	Great Britain	25 October 1918	35 years, 244 days	Chiswick	26 June 1954
