= Yasuo Ikenaka =

Japanese long-distance runner

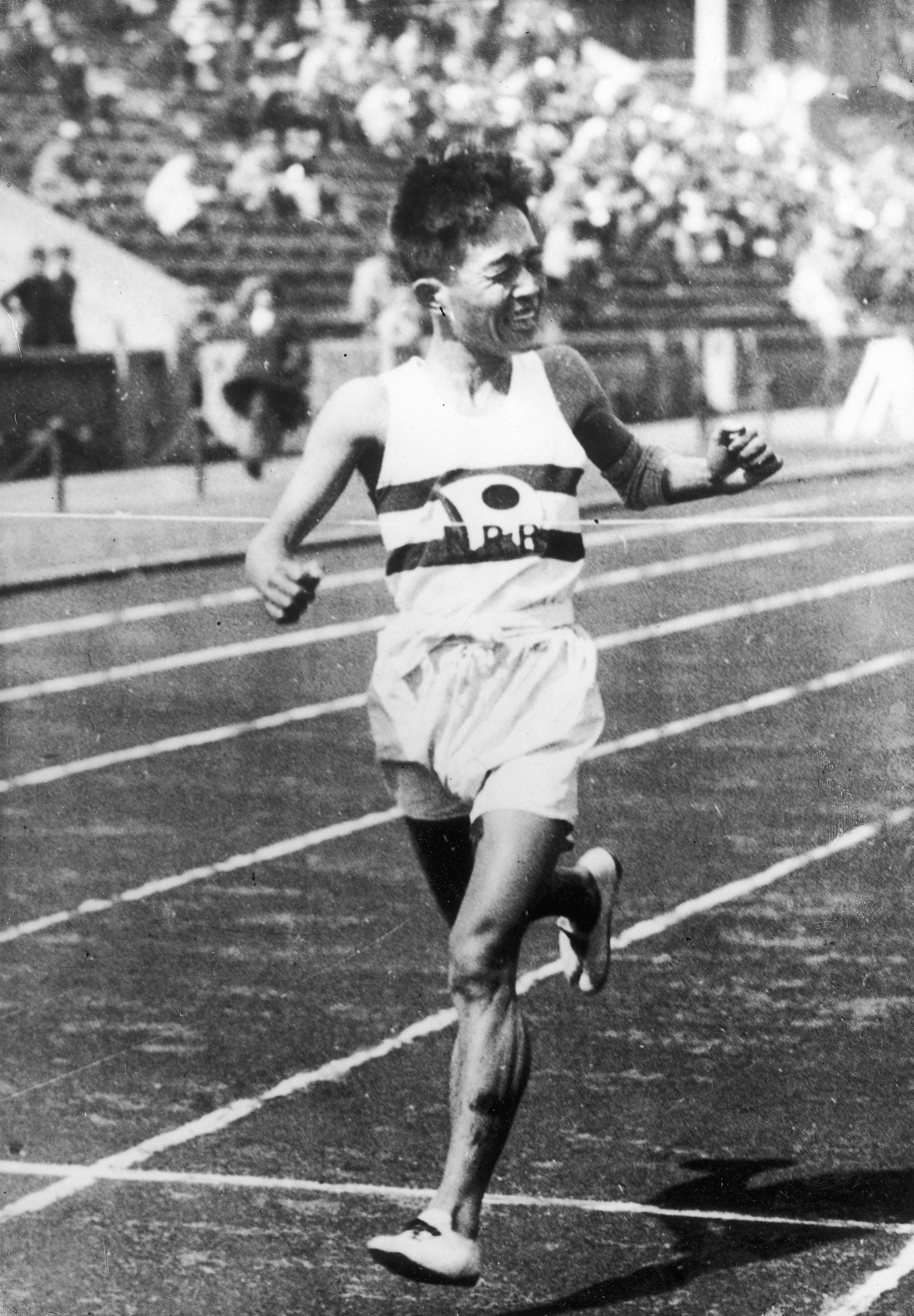
- Ikenaka at the Berlin Olympic trials on April 3, 1935 in Tokyo

Personal information
- Native name: 池中 康雄
- Born: March 25, 1914 Nakatsu, Ōita, Japan
- Died: March 14, 1992 (aged 77)

Sport
- Country: Japan
- Sport: Long-distance running
- Event: Marathon
- Club: Toyo University

Achievements and titles
- Personal best: Marathon: 2:26:44 (1935)

Yasuo Ikenaka (池中 康雄, Ikenaka Yasuo; March 1914 – March 14, 1992 (Note: Records from the Association of Road Racing Statisticians notes birthday as either March 3, 1914 or March 25, 1914. According to his obituary he died at 77 on March 14, 1992, which means his date of birth cannot be earlier than March 15, 1914.)) was a Japanese long-distance runner who is credited by the International Association of Athletics Federations for setting a world's best in the marathon on April 3, 1935. According to the IAAF, Ikenaka's time of 2:26:44 was over a minute faster than the previous record set by Fusashige Suzuki three days earlier. (Note: Although the International Association of Athletics Federations notes the date as March 31, 1935, the Association of Road Racing Statisticians shows that Fusashige Suzuki's 2:27:49 performance occurred in Tokyo on March 21, 1935 during a race in which he finished second to Sohn Kee-chung (sometimes referred to as Kee-Jung Sohn or Son Kitei) who ran a 2:26:14.)

== Notes ==
Records
| Preceded by (Japan) Fusashige Suzuki* (*see explanation in the Notes section) | Men's Marathon World Record Holder; April 3, 1935 – November 3, 1935 | Succeeded by (South Korea) Sohn Kee-chung |
