= Fusashige Suzuki =

Japanese long-distance runner

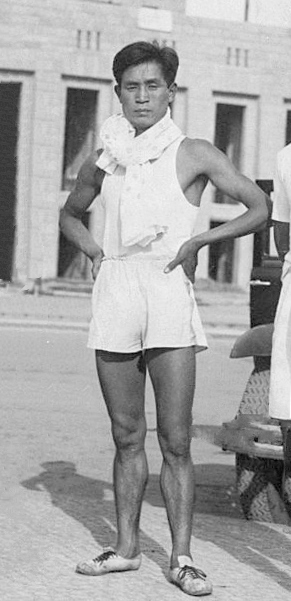
- Fusashige Suzuki at the 1936 Olympics

Personal information
- Born: February 15, 1914
- Died: June 3, 1945 (aged 31) South China Sea
- Height: 1.65 m (5 ft 5 in)
- Weight: 58 kg (128 lb)

Sport
- Sport: Long-distance running

Fusashige Suzuki (鈴木 房重, Suzuki Fusashige; February 15, 1914 – June 3, 1945) was a Japanese long-distance runner who is credited by the International Association of Athletics Federations for setting a world record in the marathon on March 31, 1935. (Note: According to the Association of Road Racing Statisticians, Fusashige Suzuki's 2:27:49 performance occurred in Tokyo on March 21, 1935 during a race in which he finished second to Sohn Kee-chung (sometimes referred to as Kee-Jung Sohn or Son Kitei) who ran a 2:26:14.) (Note: In Japan, this marathon course was not recognized officially by Japan Association of Athletic Federations.)

He was one of marathon runners dispatched to 1936 Summer Olympics but did not compete at the games due to his illness. In this game, he ran 10,000 metres, but his record is unknown. He was known for performance at Hakone Ekiden races as a member of the Nippon University team.

During the Pacific War, he was killed in action in the South China Sea.

== Notes ==
Records
Preceded by (United States) Albert Michelsen	Men's Marathon World Record Holder; March 31, 1935 – April 3, 1935	Succeeded by (Japan) Yasuo Ikenaka
