= Mildred Sampson =

New Zealand long-distance runner

Mildred "Millie" Sampson (born 13 February 1933 (Note: An article in the Saturday, 9 February 2008 edition of The New Zealand Herald indicated that she would be turning 75 on the following Monday.)) is a former New Zealand long-distance runner who held the world best in the marathon in 1964. Official memory of her performance has been muddled by poor record keeping, and the scant attention paid to women running the marathon in those early days. The International Association of Athletics Federations records her as having set a world best in the marathon on 21 July 1964, with a time of 3:19:33 in Auckland, New Zealand (Note: Peter Heidenstrom, a statistician for Athletics New Zealand, has been reported as providing a date of December 1964, however, the Association of Road Racing Statisticians notes the date of Sampson's performance was 16 August 1964. Other sources from August to October 1964 support the August date. The ARRS also notes that Sampson's mark was set during a time trial and does not recognize it in their progression of marathon world bests.), however, the 21 July 1964 was a Tuesday (not a normal race day) and there is no record of a marathon being held in New Zealand on that day (see "Forgetting Millie Sampson" by Annemarie Jutel). In fact, her performance took place a month later, and was noted on the front page of the NZ Herald on 18 August.

Sampson was reportedly encouraged to enter the marathon at the Owairaka Athletic Club by the men she trained with, including Olympians Bill Baillie and Ivan Keats. According to Sampson, Keats believed her participation would attract attention to the marathon and his running club which was organizing the event. Sampson, reported as having been fatigued due to dancing the previous night and having had no breakfast the morning of the race, ate ice cream and chocolate during the last few miles of the race. Reports after the race described her as a mother, which was untrue.

== Biography ==
In the only other marathon that Sampson ever ran, her 3:13:58 in Auckland on 9 May 1970 was good enough for the sixth best woman's time in the world that year. (Note: The New Zealand Herald incorrectly reported that Sampson's performance was the second fastest of all time. At that time, her mark was the second fastest of the year among women.) She is a three-time national champion in cross country (1966, 1968, 1972) and won unofficial national titles in the event from 1963 to 1965.

As of 2008, Sampson worked at a drycleaners.

== Notes ==
Records
Preceded by (United Kingdom) Dale Greig	Women's Marathon World Record Holder; 21 July 1964* – 6 May 1967 (*see explanation in the Notes section)	Succeeded by (Canada) Maureen Wilton
