= Scottish Athletics Hall of Fame =

The Scottish Athletics Hall of Fame, launched in 2005, is a perpetual list to honour Scottish athletes of outstanding achievement in the sport of athletics. In 2005, inductees were selected by a combination of a panel of experts and an online poll. A nominations committee was put together with a focus on identifying worthy recipients for a significantly increased list of inductees in 2018. In the case of the posthumous awards, Scottish Athletics contact family relatives to inform them of the induction process.

== History ==
The Scottish Athletics Hall of Fame was launched at the Scottish Track and Field Championships in August 2005. The inaugural inductees were Allan Wells and Eric Liddell. Liz McColgan and Wyndham Halswelle were inducted the following year. Yvonne Murray in 2007, and Tom McKean in 2008 both followed. Jim Alder was the seventh (and last athlete until 2018) to be inducted at the annual awards dinners on 31 October 2009.

After nine years, in October 2018, another fifteen athletes were announced to be inducted into the Hall of Fame. The 2018 induction happened at the organisation's awards dinner on 3 November. at the Hilton hotel in Glasgow. Lee McConnell was one of the fifteen inductees in 2018 but was unable to attend the ceremony in person. Allan Wells, inducted in 2005, helped with the presentations for his fellow inductees at the 2018 ceremony.

== Hall of Fame inductees ==
Year	Athlete	Achievements
2005	Allan Wells	Olympic and four-time Commonwealth champion
2005	Eric Liddell	Olympic Games 400 m champion
2006	Liz McColgan	World half marathon and 10,000 m champion
2006	Wyndham Halswelle	Olympic Games 400 m champion
2007	Yvonne Murray	World, European and Commonwealth champion
2008	Tom McKean	World and European indoor 800 m champion
2009	Jim Alder	Commonwealth Games marathon champion
2018	Duncan Clark	Commonwealth Games hammer champion
2018	Dale Greig	Marathon world record holder
2018	Lee McConnell	multiple world, European and Commonwealth medalist
2018	Angela Mudge	World mountain running champion
2018	Tom Nicolson	winner of 42 Scottish national titles
2018	Geoff Parsons	Triple Commonwealth Games high jump medalist
2018	Alan Paterson	European high jump champion
2018	Rosemary Payne	Commonwealth discus champion
2018	Don Ritchie	multiple World ultra Record holder
2018	Meg Ritchie	Commonwealth discus champion
2018	Ian Stewart	World, European and Commonwealth champion
2018	Lachie Stewart	Commonwealth 10,000 m champion
2018	Rosemary Stirling	Commonwealth 800 m champion
2018	James Wilson	Double Olympic medalist
2018	Dunky Wright	Scotland’s first Commonwealth Games champion
2019	Caroline Baird	4-time Paralympics Games champion.
2019	Barbara Howie	Paralympics Games medallist in athletics
2019	Colin Keay	5-time Paralympics Games champion
2019	Stephen Payton	3-time Paralympics Games champion

== Other awards ==
=== Athlete of the Year ===
Year	Winner	Nominations	Ref
2023	Josh Kerr	Laura Muir, Neil Gourley, Jemma Reekie, Scout Adkin	
2022	Jake Wightman	Eilish McColgan, Laura Muir	
2021	Laura Muir	Josh Kerr, Eilish McColgan, Jemma Reekie	
2020	Laura Muir; Jemma Reekie; Jake Wightman		
2019	Callum Hawkins	Jacob Adkin, Andy Douglas, Jake Wightman, Eilish McColgan, Laura Muir	
2018	Laura Muir	Eilidh Doyle, Jake Wightman, Charlotte Morgan, Robbie Simpson	
2017	Callum Hawkins	Sammi Kinghorn, Laura Muir, Eilish McColgan, Chris O'Hare	
2016	Laura Muir	Eilish McColgan, Lynsey Sharp, Steph Twell, Andrew Butchart, Eilidh Doyle, Andrew Douglas, Callum Hawkins	
2015	Laura Muir	Eilidh Child, Lynsey Sharp, Robbie Simpson	
2014	Eilidh Child	Libby Clegg, Mark Dry, Chris O’Hare, Lynsey Sharp	
2013	Eilidh Child	Susan Partridge, Chris O'Hare, Eilish McColgan, Laura Muir, Libby Clegg	
2012	Lynsey Sharp	Eilidh Child, Freya Murray	
2011	Lynsey Sharp		
2010	Eilidh Child		
2009	Eilidh Child		
2008	Allan Scott		
2007	Lee McConnell		
2006	Chris Baillie		
2005	Morag MacLarty		
2004	Kathy Butler		
2003	Lee McConnell (Note: Award was split into female and male categories.)		
2003	Ian Mackie		
2002	Lee McConnell	Sinead Dudgeon, Angela Mudge	
2002	Darren Ritchie	Iain Park, Jamie Quarry	
2001	Kathy Butler		
2001	Chris Baillie	Simon Pride, Ian Mackie, Jamie Quarry, Glen Stewart	
2000	Angela Mudge	Allison Curbishley, Caroline Innes, Sinead Dudgeon	
2000	Ian Mackie	Stephen Payton, S Hayward, Darren Ritchie	
1999	Sinead Dudgeon		
1999	Simon Pride		

=== Para Athlete of the Year ===
Year	Athlete	Ref
2023	Sammi Kinghorn	
2022	Sean Frame	
2021	Owen Miller	
2020	no award	
2019	Maria Lyle	
2018	Derek Rae	
2017	Sammi Kinghorn	
2016	Libby Clegg	
2015		
2014	Libby Clegg	
2013	Libby Clegg	
2012		
2011	Libby Clegg	
2010		
2009		

=== U23 Athlete of the Year ===
The award was discontinued after 2011.

Year	Athlete
2011	Lynsey Sharp
2010	Steph Twell
2009	Eilidh Child
2008	Eilidh Child
2007	Eilidh Child
2006	Gemma Nicol
2005	Kirsty Maguire
2004	Allan Scott; Collette Fagan

=== George Dallas Memorial Trophy ===
Award is annually presented by the George Dallas Trust to the person or persons who in the judgement of the trustees, have achieved distinction in, or made a material contribution to, cross country, road running, track and field or hill running in Scotland in the preceding calendar year. It can be athletes, administrators, coaches or otherwise involved in the sport.

Year	Athlete
2022	Sammi Kinghorn
2021	Josh Kerr
2020	Megan Keith
2019	Jake Wightman
2018	Eilish McColgan
2017	Zoey Clark
2016	Andrew Butchart
2015	Ellie Greenwood
2014	Libby Clegg
2013	Laura Muir
2012	Freya Murray
2011	Derek Hawkins
2010	Steph Twell
2009	Eilidh Child
2008	Angela Mudge
2007	Andrew Lemoncello
2006	Chris Baillie
2005	Shirley Webb
2004	Kathy Butler
2003	Jim Young
2002	Lee McConnell
2001	Christopher Robison
2000	Caroline Innes
1999	Sinead Dudgeon
1998	Douglas Walker
1997	Allison Curbishley
1996	Ian Mackie
1995	Melanie Neef
1994	Vikki McPherson
1993	no award
1992	Donald Ritchie
1991	Aileen McGillivary
1990	Glen Henderson
1989	Yvonne Murray; Tom McKean; Thomas Boyle
1988	Liz McColgan
1987	Jamie Henderson
1986	Yvonne Murray
1985	Tom McKean
1984	Sandra Whittaker
1983	Christopher Black
1982	Alan Wells

=== Tom Stillie Award ===
The award is given each year to the person who has contributed the most to Scottish Athletics within the preceding year.

Year	Athlete
2022	John MacKay
2021	Gerry Gaffney
2020	David Lothia; Andrew Stevenson
2019	Sandra Hardcare
2018	Adrian Scott
2017	Mike Johnston
2016	Janet Nixon
2015	Ron Morrison
2014	Mikael Huggins
2013	Liz Wilder
2012	Alan Bertram
2011	Alan Potts
2010	Inverclyde AC
2009	Marjory Cook
2008	Jim Scott
2007	Bob Gray
2006	Willue Laing
2005	Arnold Black
2004	Graham Sword
2003	Jackson Family
2002	Leslie Roy
2001	Brian Goodwin
2000	Helen Spanie
1999	George Duncan
1998	James Scott
1997	Ian Mackie
1996	Hilda McGillivray
1995	Ian Clifton
1994	George Kirk
1993	no award
1992	Alan Grosset
1991	George Duncan
1990	Edwin Taylor
1989	John Brown
1988	John Hamilton
1987	Ewan Murray
1986	Tom McKean
1985	Alex Naylor
1984	Owen Dixon
1983	Robert Greenock
1982	Cameron Sharp
1981	Allan Wells
1980	Robert Hutcheson
1979	Alan Wells
