= Masters W35 marathon world record progression =

Masters W35 marathon world record progression is the progression of world record improvements of the marathon W35 division of Masters athletics. Records must be set in properly conducted, official competitions under the standing IAAF rules unless modified by World Masters Athletics. The W35 division consists of female athletes who have reached the age of 35 but have not yet reached the age of 40, so exactly from their 35th birthday to the day before their 40th birthday. Marathon running is not normally seeded into age divisions so all of these records were set in marathon race open to most other age groups.

Key

Incomplete information Pending

Time	Athlete	Nationality	Birthdate	Location	Date
2:17:01	Mary Jepkosgei Keitany	Kenya	12 January 1982	London	23 April 2017
2:19:19	Irina Mikitenko	Germany	23 August 1972	Berlin	28 September 2008
2:21:29	Lyudmila Petrova	Russia	7 October 1968	London	23 April 2006
2:23:26	Harumi Hiroyama	Japan	2 September 1968	Nagoya	12 March 2006
2:24:35	Katrin Dörre-Heinig	Germany	6 October 1961	Hamburg	25 April 1999
2:26:34	Carla Beurskens	Netherlands	10 February 1952	Tokyo	15 November 1987
