= Beth Bonner =

American long-distance runner (1952–1998)

Elizabeth Bonner
Personal information
- Born: June 9, 1952
- Died: October 9, 1998 (aged 46) Kerrville, Texas, U.S.
- Education: Brandywine College, Auburn University (PhD)
- Occupation: Running coach

Sport
- Sport: Athletics
- Event: Long-distance running

Elizabeth Bonner (June 9, 1952 – October 9, 1998) was an American long-distance runner. On May 9, 1971, Bonner ran a 3:01:42 marathon time in Philadelphia at the AAU Eastern Regional Championships, breaking the world best set one year earlier by Caroline Walker. On September 19, 1971, she became the first winner of the women's division of the New York City Marathon at the age of 19. Some sources question the validity of Adrienne Beames' 2:46:30 time one month earlier, so Bonner's 2:55:22 performance at New York is frequently credited as the first sub-three hour performance by a woman.

Bonner was attending Brandywine College as a freshman when she had her sub-three hour race in the New York City Marathon.

Bonner earned a PhD from Auburn University. She also coached running in Louisiana and in Kerrville, Texas, at Schreiner University. She died in Kerrville in 1998 when she was hit by a truck while biking.

An annual 5K run is held in her name in Arthurdale, West Virginia.

Records
Preceded by (United States) Caroline Walker	Women's Marathon World Record Holder; May 9, 1971 – December 5, 1971	Succeeded by (United States) Cheryl Bridges
