= Maureen Wilton =

Canadian long-distance runner

Maureen "Moe" Wilton (born November 30, 1953) is a former Canadian long-distance runner who is recognized by the International Association of Athletics Federations as having set a world best in the marathon on May 6, 1967, with a time of 3:15:23 in Toronto, Ontario, Canada. (Note: The Association of Road Racing Statisticians notes her official time as 3:15:22.8) Wilton, who started running when she was nine years old, was 13 when she set the mark; it was her first marathon and run on an unpaved Eastern Canadian Marathon Championships course. Her time broke the previous record, set in 1964, by more than four minutes.

Wilton was coached by Thian "Sy" Mah. Mah would complete his first marathon that day, then go on to set a Guinness World Records mark for the most lifetime marathons. Invited by Mah, Kathrine Switzer also ran the marathon that day - only sixteen days after her historic run at the Boston Marathon. Wilton reportedly told Switzer, who finished about an hour behind her, that she was interested in The Monkees more than running.

Wilton stopped running at the age of 17, though she did compete at the World Cross-Country Championships in Glasgow, Scotland, when she was 15.

As an adult, Wilton worked in the financial industry, has two children, and is married (now known as Maureen Mancuso). Only when her daughter began competitive running did Wilton take up the sport again and share her running history with her. Wilton and Switzer ran the Toronto GoodLife Half Marathon together in 2010, the reunion documented by John Chipman in a CBC Radio documentary entitled "Did my Mom ever Run?"

A book about her life and achievement, Mighty Moe: The True Story of a Thirteen-Year-Old Women's Running Revolutionary, was released on October 15, 2019.

== Notes ==
Records
Preceded by (New Zealand) Mildred Sampson	Women's Marathon World Record Holder; May 6, 1967 – September 16, 1967	Succeeded by (West Germany) Anni Pede-Erdkamp
