= Elizabeth Anne Bonner =

American writer

Elizabeth Anne Bonner (pen name, Michael Bonner; February 19, 1924 – October 27, 1981) was an American author of Western fiction and poetry.

== Biography ==
Elizabeth Anne Bonner was born on February 19, 1924, in Dallas, Texas. Her parents were Thomas and Annabelle (Newman) Bonner.

She graduated from the University of Texas in 1944, having also been a student at Stephens College in Columbia, Missouri.

She published four books of Western fiction under the name Michael Bonner: Kennedy's Gold (1960), The Iron Noose (1961), Shadow of the Hawkin (1963) and The Disturbing Death of Jenkin Delaney (1966). She later published a book of poetry, Renaissance. A Sacramento, California, resident from 1953 to 1981, she worked for several years as director of Episcopal Community Services at St. Paul's Center.

Bonner lived in Garland, Texas, and Fort Worth, Texas, before 1946, when she married Raymond Kerns Glasscock (d. 1964) and they moved to California. They had two children, Meg and David. Bonner died on October 27, 1981.
