= Dale Greig =

Scottish long-distance runner (1937–2019)

Personal information
- Full name: Dale Sheldon Greig
- Nationality: Great Britain
- Born: 15 May 1937 Paisley
- Died: 12 May 2019 (aged 81) Paisley

Sport
- Sport: Running
- Event(s): cross country marathon ultramarathon
- Club: Tannahill Harriers

Dale Greig (15 May 1937 – 12 May 2019) was a Scottish cross country champion and pioneering long-distance runner. In 1964 she became the first woman to run a marathon in under 3 hours 30 minutes. Her time of 3:27:45 at the Isle of Wight Marathon was recognised by the International Association of Athletics Federations as a world best. (Note: According to a 2002 interview in The Independent, Greig said: "My time was actually 3hr 27min 25sec, but it was published in the papers as 3hr 27min 45sec.")

She was also the first woman to run two ultramarathons: the Isle of Man 40 in 1971 and the 55-mile London-to-Brighton race in 1972 – seven years before female competitors were officially allowed. In 1974, at the age of 37, she won the first International Masters Marathon for women, at the World Veterans' Championships in Paris.

== Biography ==
Greig was born in Paisley, Renfrewshire and lived there all her life. She and her twin sister, Cynthia, attended the John Neilson Institution in Paisley. After leaving school, Greig ran for the Glasgow-based Bellahouston Harriers for a short time before setting up her own women's club, Tannahill Harriers in 1959. At the time, the furthest women were permitted to run in competition was one mile on the track and up to three miles in cross country, occasionally extended to longer distances.

Greig competed at track events, winning several medals at the Scottish Championships: Silver in the 880yds in 1956 and Bronze in the mile in 1958,1959, 1960 and 1966. She was Scottish National Cross Country Champion in 1960, 1962, 1964 and 1968.

== Isle of Wight Marathon ==
Greig worked for the publisher and printer Walter Ross (1918-1993) at his business in Glasgow. Ross was a keen runner who encouraged Greig in many of her endeavours. Ross's older brother, Bill, lived on the Isle of Wight and was a member of Ryde Harriers, the organisers of the Isle of Wight Marathon. Greig had visited the island in May 1963 and run part of the marathon course. When she returned in 1964, the organisers were persuaded to allow her to take part. The race took place on 23 May. Greig was made to start four minutes ahead of the men. This meant that her run could be called a time trial, rather than a race against the men. Greig was followed round the course by an ambulance. Her time of 3:27:45 was recorded and published and later recognised as a world best performance by the IAAF.

Greig held the world's best title until Mildred Sampson from New Zealand set a new mark nearly three months later. (Note: The International Association of Athletics Federations notes Sampson's mark as being set on 21 July 1964. Peter Heidenstrom, a statistician for Athletics New Zealand, has been reported as providing a date of December 1964, however, the Association of Road Racing Statisticians notes the date of Sampson's performance was 16 August 1964. Other sources from August to October 1964 support the August date. The ARRS also indicates that Sampson's mark was set during a time trial and does not recognize it in their progression of marathon world bests.)

== Other races ==
Greig was the first woman to run two ultramarathons. In 1971 she ran the Isle of Man 40-mile race, finishing in 6:48:00. The race did not officially admit women until 1982. In 1972, she became the first woman to run the 55-mile London-to-Brighton race, finishing in 8:30:04. Women were not officially admitted to the race until 1980, where Leslie Watson placed first.

In 1971, Greig ran the Ben Nevis fell race, again unofficially. She finished in 3:02:02.

In 1974, at the age of 37, she won the first International Masters Marathon for women, at the World Veterans' Championships in Paris, with a time of 3:45:21. In 1976, she competed in the World Veterans' Marathon in Coventry finishing 10th woman in 3:39:44.

Greig's competitive running career came to an end in 1982, following an accident in a swimming pool in which she injured both her feet.

== Athletics administration ==
Greig's life was dedicated to athletics, particularly to women's running and later, veterans' running. In 1960, she was one of the founders of the Scottish Women's Cross County Union. Over the next decade, she served as its secretary, then treasurer and later as president. Along with Walter Ross, Greig was a member of the Organising Executive when the IGAL Veterans World Championships came to Glasgow in 1980. The event was supported by the city council and was a huge success with hundreds of runners from 26 countries running in the 10k and marathon races. Greig served as IGAL Assistant Secretary from 1982 to 1987.

Dale Greig was admitted to the Scottish Athletics Hall of Fame in November 2018.

== Notes ==
Records
Preceded by (United States) Merry Lepper	Women's Marathon World Record Holder; 23 May 1964 – 21 July 1964* (*see explanation in the Notes section)	Succeeded by (New Zealand) Mildred Sampson
