= Neural therapy =

Type of alternative medicine

In neural therapy anaesthetic is injected to try to disrupt action potential said to cause inflammation.

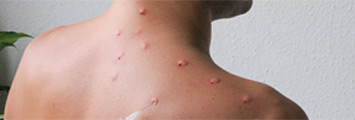
Skin quads in segment neural therapy

Neural therapy is a form of alternative medicine in which local anesthetic is injected into certain locations of the body in an attempt to treat chronic pain and illness.

The International Medical Association of Neural Therapy has about 400 members some of whom have been practising in this field for over 30 years. Neural Therapy is both in theory and practice a pseudoscience and studies have found it not to be of any benefit.

== Description and history ==
Neural therapy has been described as a form of holistic medicine for treating illness and chronic pain. According to Quackwatch, neural therapy is "a bizarre approach claimed to treat pain and disease by injecting local anesthetics into nerves, scars, glands, trigger points, and other tissues".

The idea underlying the therapy is that "interference fields" (Störfelder) at certain sites of the body are responsible for a type of electric energy that causes illness. The fields can be disrupted by injection, allowing the body to heal.

The practice originated in 1925, when Ferdinand Huneke, a German surgeon, used a newly launched pain drug that contained procaine (a local anaesthetic) on his sister who had severe intractable migraines. Instead of using it intramuscularly as recommended, he injected it intravenously and the migraine attack stopped immediately. He and his brother Walter subsequently used Novocaine in a similar way to treat a variety of ailments.

In 1940 Ferdinand Huneke injected the painful shoulder of a woman who also had an osteomyelitis in her leg, which at that time (before antibiotics) threatened her with amputation. The shoulder pain improved somewhat but the leg wound became itchy. On injecting the leg wound, the shoulder pain vanished immediately – a reaction he called the "secondary phenomenon" (Sekundenphänomen). In segment therapy, a local anaesthetic in the form of skin quads is injected in the area of the corresponding dermatome (called Head zones) of the internal organs or into vegetative ganglia. The reflective effect is to be conveyed via the vegetative nervous system to the affected segment.

== Reception, effectiveness and safety ==
Neural therapy is practiced mostly in South America and Europe. A 2007 survey of family physicians in Germany found neural therapy to be among the most used of alternative medical techniques.

Quackwatch includes neural therapy on its list of "questionable treatments".

According to the American Cancer Society, "available scientific evidence does not support claims that neural therapy is effective in treating cancer or any other disease". Overall the risks of the treatment, such as of needle damage to organs, outweigh any benefit it may have.

== See also ==
- List of ineffective cancer treatments
- Prolotherapy
