= Masters M90 marathon world record progression =

Marathon world record

Masters M90 marathon world record progression is the progression of world record improvements of the marathon M90 division of Masters athletics. Records must be set in properly conducted, official competitions under the standing IAAF rules unless modified by World Masters Athletics. The M90 division consists of male athletes who have reached the age of 90 but have not yet reached the age of 95, so exactly from their 90th birthday to the day before their 95th birthday. Marathon running is not normally seeded into age divisions so all of these records were set in marathon races open to most other age groups.

Key

Incomplete information Pending

Time	Athlete	Nationality	Birthdate	Age	Location	Date	Ref
4:30:30	Giuseppe Damato	Italy	9 January 1936	90 years, 94 days	Milan	12 April 2026	
6:35:47	Mike Fremont	United States	23 February 1922	90 years, 262 days	Huntington	11 November 2012	
9:23:25	Paul Spangler	United States	18 March 1899	92 years, 230 days	New York City	3 November 1991	
