= Günter Mielke =

German long-distance runner (1942–2010)

Günter Mielke (30 November 1942 – 18 January 2010) was a West German long-distance runner who specialized in the 10,000 metres and marathon.

He was born in Berlin. He won the West German championships in marathon in 1975 and 1977 and won silver medals in 10,000 metres in 1971, 1972 and 1974. He represented several clubs, including ASV Köln, TV Wattenscheid, OSC Berlin, VfL Wolfsburg and LG Neckar-Odenwald. He also won the 1977 Berlin Marathon.

Internationally he competed in 10,000 metres at the 1972 Summer Olympics without finishing the race, and finished 54th in the 1976 Olympic marathon. His personal bests were 28.44.6 minutes in the 10,000 metres, achieved in 1972; and 2.13.58 hours in the marathon, achieved in 1981.

He died on 18 January 2010 in New Zealand.
