= Masters W90 marathon world record progression =

Masters W90 marathon world record progression is the progression of world record improvements of the marathon W90 division of Masters athletics. Records must be set in properly conducted, official competitions under the standing IAAF rules unless modified by World Masters Athletics. The W90 division consists of female athletes who have reached the age of 90 but have not yet reached the age of 95, so exactly from their 90th birthday to the day before their 95th birthday. Marathon running is not normally seeded into age divisions so all of these records were set in marathon races open to most other age groups.

Key

Incomplete information Pending

Time	Athlete	Nationality	Birthdate	Age	Location	Date
6:47:31	Betty Jean McHugh	Canada	7 November 1927	90 years, 33 days	Honolulu	10 December 2017
7:07:44	Harriette Thompson	United States	27 March 1923	91 years, 66 days	San Diego County	1 June 2014
8:53:08	Mavis Lindgren	United States	2 April 1907	90 years, 179 days	Portland	28 September 1997
