= Merry Lepper =

American long-distance runner

Merry Lepper (born December 31, 1942) is a former American long-distance runner from California who is recognized by the International Association of Athletics Federations as having set a world best in the marathon on December 16, 1963, with a time of 3:37:07 at the Western Hemisphere Marathon in Culver City, California. (Note: According to the Association of Road Racing Statisticians, the course for the Western Hemisphere Marathon was short in 1962 and 1963. The ARRS also notes the date of the race as December 14, 1963.)

In the early 1960s, Lepper trained with Lyn Carman (also from California) (Note: Carman has been reported as also being in her early 20s, however, data compiled by the Association of Road Racing Statisticians indicates that she would have been 27 years old.)and the pair began to run unofficially in road races. At the 1963 Western Hemisphere Marathon, the two women hid along the sidelines then joined the men just after the start. A race official attempted to remove them from the course and Carman reportedly yelled, "I have the right to use public streets for running!" The women were timed by a sympathetic AAU official; Carman eventually dropped out around the 20 mile mark, but Lepper finished with a time of 3:37:07 .

Carman would eventually win the Santa Barbara Marathon in 1966, 1969, and 1970, and the World Masters Marathon in 1969.

The book "Marathon Crasher: The Life and Times of Merry Lepper, the First American Woman to Run a Marathon" (2012), by LA-based sports journalist David Davis, tells of Merry Lepper's 1963 marathon. However, in 1959, Arlene Pieper (also an American) became the first woman to officially finish a marathon in America when she finished the Pikes Peak Marathon. Davis's book states, "Without discounting her [Pieper's] achievement, Pikes Peak marathon is considered to be more of an endurance climb, with much walking involved, as opposed to a competitive marathon race."

In 2013, Lepper received a commendation from Culver City. The commendation reads in part: "Now, therefore, the City Council of the City of Culver City, California, hereby congratulates and commends Merry Lepper, a shining example of how one person can overcome tremendous hurdles to fulfill a dream and, in the process, pave the way for generations to come."

== Notes ==
Records
Preceded by (United Kingdom) Violet Piercy	Women's Marathon World Record Holder; December 16, 1963* – May 23, 1964 (*see explanation in the Notes section)	Succeeded by (United Kingdom) Dale Greig
