= List of masters world records in road running =

This is a list of world records for Masters age groups in the sport of road running. The world governing body for masters athletics is World Masters Athletics (WMA). WMA conducts various world championships in what are called "non stadia" events, meaning races not held in the confines of a stadium. But with the exception of the marathon and three race walking events, WMA does not publish world records in other common road racing distances. These unofficial records are kept instead by the Association of Road Racing Statisticians. In the case of the marathon, these two organizations agree on many records, but in the age groups where they disagree, the WMA ratified record is highlighted in yellow.

== Men ==
=== 5K run ===
Age group	Record	Athlete	Nationality	Birthdate	Age	Date	Meet	Place	Ref
M40	13:38	Bernard Lagat	United States	12 December 1974	41	3 April 2016	Carlsbad 5000	Carlsbad, United States	
M45	14:25	Alastair Watson	Great Britain	1977	46	6 May 2023		Leicester, United Kingdom	
M50	14:51+	Mark Kiptoo	Kenya	21 June 1976	50	25 October 2026	Frankfurt Marathon	Frankfurt, Germany	
M55	15:31	Martin Rees	Great Britain	28 February 1953	55	17 July 2008		Gloucester, United Kingdom	
M60	16:01	Joël Rondole	France	21 May 1964	61	11 October 2025		Croissy-Beaubourg, France	
M65	16:35	Alastair Walker	Great Britain	16 June 1956	65	8 June 2022		Carlisle, United Kingdom	
M70	17:59	Alan Davies	Great Britain	12 August 1952	71	8 May 2024		Swansea, United Kingdom	
M75	18:45	Ed Whitlock	Canada	6 March 1931	75	14 July 2006		Toronto, Canada	
M80	22:41	Stephen Charlton	Great Britain	4 October 1926	80	24 June 2007		Horwich, United Kingdom	
M85	24:57	Stephen Charlton	Great Britain	4 October 1926	85	21 August 2012		London, United Kingdom	
M90	33:46	Henry Sypniewski	United States	7 July 1918	90	5 October 2008		Syracuse, United States	
M95	40:52	Roy Englert	United States	11 September 1922	95	1 October 2017		Syracuse, United States	

=== 8K run ===
Age group	Record	Athlete	Nationality	Birthdate	Age	Date	Meet	Place	Ref
M40	22:39	Giuseppe Pambianchi	Italy	27 Jan 1951	41	15 Feb 1992		Cento ITA	
M45	23:59	Rod Dixon	New Zealand	13 Jul 1950	48	11 Apr 1999		Wimbledon Village ENG	
M50	23:52+	Mark Kiptoo	Kenya	21 June 1976	50	25 October 2026	Frankfurt Marathon	Frankfurt, Germany	
M55	25:23	Martin Fiz	Spain	3 Mar 1963	55	13 Jan 2019		Valencia ESP	
M60	26:10	Martin Rees	Great Britain	28 Feb 1953	60	14 Sep 2013		Sandhurst ENG	
M65	28:36	Ed Whitlock	Canada	6 Mar 1931	65	8 Jul 1996		Toronto, Ontario CAN	
M70	30:44	Ed Whitlock	Canada	6 Mar 1931	70	20 Jun 2001		Toronto, Ontario CAN	
M75	31:52	Warren Utes	United States	25 Jun 1920	75	4 Jul 1995		Cedar Rapids, Iowa USA	
M80	35:41	Stephen Charlton	Great Britain	4 Oct 1926	80	17 Apr 2007		London ENG	
M85	41:14	Stephen Charlton	Great Britain	4 Oct 1926	85	31 Jul 2012		London ENG	
M90	1:08:37	Henry Sypniewski	United States	7 Jul 1918	90	7 Mar 2009		Buffalo, New York USA	
M95	2:00:42	Abraham Weintraub	United States	3 Feb 1910	98	15 Jun 2008		New York, New York USA	

=== 10K run ===
Age group	Record	Athlete	Nationality	Birthdate	Age	Date	Meet	Place	Ref
M35	27:11	Amos Bett	Kenya	1986	36	1 October 2022		Lille, France	
M40	27:48	Bernard Lagat	United States	12 December 1974	40	10 May 2015		Manchester, United Kingdom	
M45	29:28	Kenneth Mburu Mungara	Kenya	7 September 1973	49	29 March 2023	World Masters Indoor Championships	Toruń, Poland	
M45	28:56 (Note: downhill course)	Reyes Estévez	Spain	2 August 1976	47	12 November 2023	Derbi de las Aficiones 2023	Madrid, Spain	
M50	30:01+	Mark Kiptoo	Kenya	21 June 1976	50	25 October 2026	Frankfurt Marathon	Frankfurt, Germany	
M55	31:40	Martin Fiz	Spain	3 March 1963	55	13 January 2019		Valencia, Spain	
M60	32:34	Joël Rondole	France	21 May 1964	60	10 May 2026		Troyes, France	
M65	34:04	Alastair Walker	Great Britain	16 June 1956	66	16 April 2023	Round the Houses 10K	Grangemouth, United Kingdom	
M70	37:05	Alan Davies	Great Britain	12 August 1952	72	15 September 2024		Swansea, United Kingdom	
M75	39:31	Cees Stolwijk	Netherlands	10 January 1950	75	5 October 2025		Utrecht, Netherlands	
M80	42:58	Ed Whitlock	Canada	6 March 1931	80	11 September 2011		Toronto, Canada	
M85	48:57	Fokke Kramer	Germany	13 April 1938	85	1 May 2023		Kaltenkirchen, Germany	
M90	1:05:23	Ian Winship	Great Britain	2 July 1936	90	13 September 2026	Cumbernauld 10k	North Lanarkshire, United Kingdom	

=== 12K run ===
Age group	Record	Athlete	Nationality	Birthdate	Age	Date	Meet	Place	Ref
M40	35:57	Antonio Villanueva	Mexico	25 Jul 1940	42	15 May 1983		Portland, United States	
M45	37:07	Benedito Donizetti Gomes	Brazil	16 Nov 1961	46	2 Mar 2008		San Pablo, Brazil	
M50	35:51+	Mark Kiptoo	Kenya	21 June 1976	50	25 October 2026	Frankfurt Marathon	Frankfurt, Germany	
M55	42:00	Marc VanderHoeven	Belgium	1 Jan 1960	55	19 Apr 2015		Vieux-Conde, France	
M60	42:54.1	Thomas McCormack	United States	1 Sep 1953	61	16 Nov 2014		Alexandria, United States	
M65	44:27	Ed Whitlock	Canada	6 Mar 1931	68	3 Oct 1999		Buffalo, United States	
M70	48:37.9	Doug Goodhue	United States	21 Feb 1942	72	16 Nov 2014		Alexandria, United States	
M75	54:52	Joseph Fernandez	United States	6 Oct 1928	75	22 May 2004		Bedford, United States	
M80	56:33	John Keston	United States	5 Dec 1924	80	1 May 2005		Spokane, United States	
M85	1:16:17	John Keston	United States	5 Dec 1924	85	2 May 2010		Spokane, United States	
M90	1:34:40	Roy Englert	United States	11 Sep 1922	91	17 Nov 2013		Alexandria, United States	

=== 15K run ===
Age group	Record	Athlete	Nationality	Birthdate	Age	Date	Meet	Place	Ref
M40	44:14	Pierre Levisse	France	21 Feb 1952	40	28 Jun 1992		Portland, United States	
M45	45:56	Mbarak Hussein	United States	4 Apr 1965	45	11 Jul 2010	Boilermaker Road Race	Utica, United States	
M50	44:43+	Mark Kiptoo	Kenya	21 June 1976	50	25 October 2026	Frankfurt Marathon	Frankfurt, Germany	
M55	49:27	Steve Moneghetti	Australia	26 Sep 1962	56	27 Jul 2019		Ballarat, Australia	
M60	54:32.0	Cees Stolwijk	Netherlands	10 Jan 1950	63	17 Nov 2013		Nijmegen, Netherlands	
M65	53:15	Alex Stienstra	Netherlands	6 Jul 1959	65	17 Nov 2024	Zevenheuvelenloop	Nijmegen, Netherlands	
M70	58:19	Ed Whitlock	Canada	6 Mar 1931	70	29 Apr 2001		Guelph, Canada	
M75	1:00:29	Ed Whitlock	Canada	6 Mar 1931	75	12 Nov 2006	Stockade-athon 15K	Schenectady, United States	
M80	1:07:05	Ed Whitlock	Canada	6 Mar 1931	80	13 Nov 2011	Stockade-athon 15K	Schenectady, United	
M85	1:15:10	Ed Whitlock	Canada	6 Mar 1931	85	13 Nov 2016	Stockade-athon 15K	Schenectady, United	
M90	2:01:41	Henry Sypniewski	United States	7 Jul 1918	90	1 Sep 2008		Buffalo, United States	

=== 20K run ===
Age group	Record	Athlete	Nationality	Birthdate	Age	Date	Meet	Place	Ref
M40	1:01:37	Keith Anderson	Great Britain	10 Aug 1957	40	1 Sep 1997	New Haven Road Race	New Haven, United States	
M45	1:02:17	Michael Hurd	Great Britain	19 Dec 1945	45	29 Jun 1991		Hardelot, France	
M50	1:00:21+	Mark Kiptoo	Kenya	21 June 1976	50	25 October 2026	Frankfurt Marathon	Frankfurt, Germany	
M55	1:07:46	Martín Fiz	Spain	3 Mar 1963	55	24 Mar 2018	IAAF Trinidad Alfonso World Half Marathon Championships Mass Race	Valencia, Spain	
M60	1:07:59	Joël Rondole	France	21 May 1964	61	11 October 2026	Les 20 km de Paris	Paris, France	
M65	1:13:25	Patrick Roussel	France	19 March 1947	67	12 October 2014		Paris, France	
M70	1:43:01	Joseph Cupit	France	21 February 1943	73	9 October 2016		Paris, France	
M75	1:30:10	Ed Benham	United States	12 Jul 1907	75	29 May 1983		Washington, D.C., United States	
M80	1:33:56	Ed Benham	United States	12 Jul 1907	81	8 Apr 1989		Medford, United States	

=== Half Marathon ===
Age group	Record	Athlete	Nationality	Birthdate	Age	Date	Meet	Place	Ref
M40	59:53	Tadesse Abraham	Switzerland	12 August 1982	40	18 September 2022	Copenhagen Marathon	Copenhagen, Denmark	
M45	1:01:28	Josphat Kiprono Menjo	Kenya	20 August 1979	45	19 October 2024	Bilbao Night Half Marathon	Bilbao, Spain	
M50	1:03:57+	Mark Kiptoo	Kenya	21 June 1976	50	25 October 2026	Frankfurt Marathon	Frankfurt, Germany	
M55	1:09:39	Joaquim Figueiredo	Portugal	17 February 1967	57	27 October 2024		Valencia, Spain	
M60	1:11:31	Martin Rees	Great Britain	28 February 1953	60	3 March 2013		Bath, United Kingdom	
M65	1:16:25	Wil vanderLee	Netherlands	23 October 1929	67	6 April 1997		Rosmalen, Netherlands	
M70	1:19:24	Eddy Vierendeels	Belgium	7 November 1952	71	10 March 2024	Bashir's Run	Ghent, Belgium	
M75	1:27:09	Cees Stolwijk		10 January 1950	75	9 March 2025		Den Haag, Netherlands	
M80	1:38:59	Ed Whitlock	Canada	6 March 1931	81	16 September 2012		Milton, Canada	
M85	1:50:47	Ed Whitlock	Canada	6 March 1931	85	24 April 2016		Waterloo, Canada	
M90	2:56:26	Mike Fremont	United States	23 February 1922	90	19 August 2012		Morrow, United States	

=== Marathon ===
Age group	Record	Athlete	Nationality	Birthdate	Age	Date	Meet	Place	Ref
M40 progression	2:04:19	Kenenisa Bekele	Ethiopia	13 June 1982	41	3 December 2023	Valencia Marathon	Valencia, Spain	
M40 progression	2:04:15	Kenenisa Bekele	Ethiopia	13 June 1982	41	21 April 2024	London Marathon	London, United Kingdom	
M45 progression	2:14:16	Jackson Kipngok Yegon	Kenya	16 August 1960	45	5 March 2006		Torreon, Mexico	
M45 progression	2:14:23	Bernard Lagat	United States	12 December 1974	45	29 February 2020	U.S. Olympic Trials Marathon	Atlanta, United States	
M45 progression	2:09:12	Mark Kiptoo	Kenya	21 June 1976	46	23 April 2023	Zürich Marathon	Zurich, Switzerland	
M50 progression	2:19:29	Titus Mamabolo	South Africa	11 January 1941	50	20 July 1991		Durban, South Africa	
M50 progression	2:15:24	Mark Kiptoo	Kenya	21 June 1976	50	25 October 2026	Frankfurt Marathon	Frankfurt, Germany	
M55 progression	2:25:56	Piet van Alphen	Netherlands	16 August 1930	55	19 April 1986	Rotterdam Marathon	Rotterdam, Netherlands	
M55 progression	2:24:05	Aleksandr Rogoten	Russia	22 September 1969	55	29 September 2024	Berlin Marathon	Berlin, Germany	
M60 progression	2:36:30	Yoshihisa Hosaka	Japan	5 January 1949	60	1 February 2009	Beppu Marathon	Oita, Japan	
M60 progression	2:30:02	Tommy Hughes	Ireland	8 January 1960	60	24 October 2020	Lisburn Festival of Running	Lisburn, Ireland	
M60 progression	2:28:28	Mohammed El Yamani	France	4 September 1964	61	15 February 2026	Seville Marathon	Seville, Spain	
M65 progression	2:41:57	Derek Turnbull	New Zealand	5 December 1926	65	12 April 1992	London Marathon	London, United Kingdom	
M70 progression	2:54:19	Joseph Schoonbroodt	Netherlands	11 September 1950	71	8 May 2022	Maas Marathon	Visé, Belgium	
M75 progression	3:04:53.4	Ed Whitlock	Canada	6 March 1931	76	15 April 2007	Rotterdam Marathon	Rotterdam, Netherlands	
M80 progression	3:15:53.9	Ed Whitlock	Canada	6 March 1931	80	16 October 2011	Toronto Waterfront Marathon	Toronto, Canada	
M85 progression	3:56:38	Ed Whitlock	Canada	6 March 1931	85	16 October 2016	Toronto Waterfront Marathon	Toronto, Canada	
M90	4:35:14	Giuseppe Damato	Italy	9 January 1936	90	12 April 2026	Milano Marathon	Milan, Italy	

== Women ==
=== 5K run ===
Age group	Record	Athlete	Nationality	Birthdate	Age	Date	Meet	Place	Ref
W40	15:43	Olga Firsová	Australia	11 May 1983	40	1 July 2023	Gold Coast Airport Fun Run	Gold Coast, Australia	
W45	16:13.7	Linda Somers	United States	7 May 1961	48	26 Nov 2009		San Jose, California USA	
W50	16:38.8	Tatyana Pozdniakova	Ukraine	4 Mar 1955	50	11 Aug 2005		Manchester, New Hampshire USA	
W55	17:34	Lucy Elliott	Great Britain	9 March 1966	56	22 June 2022		Portsmouth, United Kingdom	
W60	17:45 (17:42 chip)	Clare Elms	Great Britain	26 December 1963	62	2 June 2026	Battersea 5k 2026	Battersea, United Kingdom	
W65	19:50.3	Sabra Harvey	United States	2 Mar 1949	68	3 Jun 2017		Houston, Texas USA	
W70	21:17	Sarah Roberts	Great Britain	6 October 1949	74	4 September 2024	Hatfield Mid Week 5k Series	Hatfield, United Kingdom	
W75	21:33	Sarah Roberts	Great Britain	6 October 1949	75	17 May 2025	5k Festival	Shrewsbury, Shropshire, United Kingdom	
W80	24:08	Jan Holmquist	United States	1944	80	19 May 2024		Massachusetts, USA	
W85	34:23	Lenore Montgomery	Canada	28 May 1930	86	2 Apr 2017	Carlsbad 5000	Carlsbad, California USA	
W90	46:24	Evelyn Tripp	United States	19 Jan 1916	93	7 Mar 2009		Greenville, South Carolina USA	
W95	51:09	Rejeanne Fairhead	Canada	11 Dec 1926	96	27 May 2023	Ottawa Race Weekend	Ottawa, Ontario Canada	

=== 8K run ===
Age group	Record	Athlete	Nationality	Birthdate	Age	Date	Meet	Place	Ref
W40	26:09	Firiya Sultanova	Russia	29 April 1961	42	23 November 2003		Philadelphia, United States	
W45	25:56	Tatyana Pozdniakova	Ukraine	4 March 1955	48	15 March 2003		Virginia Beach, United States	
W50	26:41	Tatyana Pozdniakova	Ukraine	4 March 1955	50	19 March 2005		Virginia Beach, United States	
W55	29:05+	Clare Elms	Great Britain	26 December 1963	55	11 June 2019		Battersea, United Kingdom	
W55	Note: "+" mark made at 5 miles (8.047 km)								
W60	29:58	Michelle Rohl	United States	12 November 1965	60	22 November 2025		Philadelphia, United States	
W60	29:53+	Clare Elms	Great Britain	26 December 1963	62	5 May 2026		Battersea, United Kingdom	
W60	Note: "+" mark made at 5 miles (8.047 km)								
W65	33:47.2 h	Sabra Harvey	United States	2 March 1949	65	22 March 2014		Houston, United States	
W70	33:05	Liz Schad	Canada	28 September 1955	70	21 November 2025		Philadelphia, United States	
W75	37:45	Sarah Roberts	Great Britain	6 October 1949	75	24 November 2024		Hatfield, United Kingdom	
W80	43:49	Betty Jean McHugh	Canada	7 Nov 1927	80	31 Aug 2008		Richmond, Canada	
W85	55:25	Lenore Montgomery	Canada	28 May 1930	85	11 Oct 2015		Victoria, Canada	

=== 10K run ===
Age group	Record	Athlete	Nationality	Birthdate	Age	Date	Meet	Place	Ref
W35	30:41	Mary Keitany	Kenya	18 Jan 1982	35	5 Aug 2017		Cape Elizabeth, United States	
W40	31:37+	Edna Kiplagat	Kenya	15 November 1979	44	14 January 2024		Houston, United States	
W45	32:29	Sinead Diver	Australia	17 Feb 1977	45	23 Oct 2022		Burnie, Australia	
W50	34:14	Linda Somers	United States	7 May 1961	50	25 Sep 2011		Paso Robles, United States	
W55	36:10	Karima Harris	Great Britain	23 September 1969	56	28 Sep 2025	Vitality London 10,000	London, United Kingdom	
W60	36:43	Silke Schmidt	Germany	27 Mar 1959	60	20 Oct 2019		Utrecht, Netherlands	
W65	38:37	Rosa Mota	Portugal	29 June 1958	66	16 Dec 2024		Lisbon, Portugal	
W65	38:25 (38:23 chip) (Note: downhill course)	Rosa Mota	Portugal	29 Jun 1958	66	31 December 2024	San Silvestre Vallecana	Madrid, Spain	
W70	43:20	Nora Cary	United States	1954	70	27 Apr 2025	USATF 10k Championships	Dedham, United States	
W75	44:33	Sarah Roberts	Great Britain	6 October 1949	75	6 October 2024	Standalone 10K	Letchworth, United Kingdom	
W80	52:45	Jan Holmquist	United States	1944	80	27 Apr 2025	USATF 10k Championships	Dedham, United States	
W85	59:51	Deidre Larkin	South Africa	24 Sep 1931	85	29 Jan 2017		Benoni, South Africa	

=== 12K run ===
Age group	Record	Athlete	Nationality	Birthdate	Age	Date	Meet	Place	Ref
W40	40:04	Jennifer Rhines	United States	1 Jul 1974	41	15 Nov 2015		Alexandria, Virginia USA	
W45	42:56	Priscilla Welch	United States	22 Nov 1944	46	5 May 1991		Spokane, Washington USA	
W55	46:26.9	Joan Samuelson	United States	16 May 1957	57	16 Nov 2014		Alexandria, Virginia USA	
W60	48:53.6	Kathryn Martin	United States	30 Sep 1951	63	16 Nov 2014		Alexandria, Virginia USA	
W65	51:26.4	Emmi Luthi	Switzerland	1 Mar 1944	65	4 Apr 2009		Kehrsatz SUI	
W70	58:22	June Machala	United States	1 Jan 1931	70	6 May 2001		Spokane, Washington USA	
W75	1:05:00.7	Heide Moebius	United States	10 Nov 1938	76	16 Nov 2014		Alexandria, Virginia USA	

=== 15K run ===
Age group	Record	Athlete	Nationality	Birthdate	Age	Date	Meet	Place	Ref
W40	47:47+	Edna Kiplagat	Kenya	15 November 1979	44	14 January 2024	Houston Half Marathon	Houston, United States	
W45	49:48	Evy Palm	Sweden	31 Jan 1942	45	21 Nov 1987		Monte Carlo, Monaco	
W50	52:38	Monica Joyce	United States	16 Jul 1958	50	14 Mar 2009		Jacksonville, United States	
W55	59:05	Diane Legare	Canada	19 Mar 1951	55	12 Nov 2006	Stockade-athon 15K	Schenectady, United States	
W60	59:17+	Jenny Hitchings	United States	1 July 1963	60	8 October 2023	Chicago Marathon	Chicago, United States	
W65	1:00:37+	Rosa Mota	Portugal	29 Jun 1958	65	22 Oct 2023	Valencia Half Marathon	Valencia, Spain	
W70	1:12:52	Jo Klein	Netherlands	1 May 1934	70	21 Nov 2004		Nijmegen, Netherlands	
W75	1:16:55+	Vera Nystad	Norway	12 Dez 1945	76	25 Sept 2022	Berlin Marathon	Berlin, Germany	
W80	1:25:09	Libby James	United States	12 Jul 1936	80	29 Oct 2016		Tulsa, United States	
W85	2:29:01	Haley Olson	United States	8 Nov 1928	87	12 Mar 2016		Jacksonville, United States	
W90	2:45:41	Judith Baizan	United States	21 Mar 1925	90	20 Feb 2016		Tampa, United States	

=== 20K run ===
Age group	Record	Athlete	Nationality	Birthdate	Age	Date	Meet	Place	Ref
W40	1:08:47	Colleen De Reuck	United States	16 Apr 1964	41	5 Sep 2005	New Haven Road Race	New Haven, United States	
W40	1:04:21	Edna Kiplagat	Kenya	15 November 1979	44	14 January 2024	Houston Half Marathon	Houston, United States	
W45	1:07:21	Colleen De Reuck	United States	16 Apr 1964	45	7 Sep 2009	New Haven Road Race	New Haven, United States	
W50	1:17:46	Kathryn Martin	United States	30 Sep 1951	52	6 Sep 2004	New Haven Road Race	New Haven, United States	
W55	1:18:44	Rae Baymiller	United States	27 Jul 1943	55	7 Sep 1998	New Haven Road Race	New Haven, United States	
W60	1:19:12+	Jenny Hitchings	United States	1 July 1963	60	8 October 2023	Chicago Marathon	Chicago, United States	
W65	1:21:17+	Rosa Mota	Portugal	29 Jun 1958	65	22 Oct 2023	Valencia Half Marathon	Valencia, Spain	
W75	1:42:14+	Vera Nystad	Norway	12 Dez 1945	76	25 Sept 2022	Berlin Marathon	Berlin, Germany	

=== Half Marathon ===
Age group	Record	Athlete	Nationality	Birthdate	Age	Date	Meet	Place	Ref
W40	1:07:52	Edna Kiplagat	Kenya	15 November 1979	44	14 January 2024	Houston Half Marathon	Houston, United States	
W45	1:09:00	Sinead Diver	Australia	17 Feb 1977	45	24 Apr 2022	Meta : Time : Trials	Málaga, Spain	
W50	1:15:18	Linda Somers	United States	7 May 1961	50	30 Oct 2011		Los Angeles, United States	
W55	1:17:45	Karima Harris	Great Britain	23 September 1969	55	16 March 2025	Fleet Half Marathon	Fleet, United Kingdom	
W60	1:21:33	Silke Schmidt	Germany	7 Aug 1959	60	3 Nov 2019		Dordrecht, Netherlands	
W65	1:25:26	Mariko Yugeta	Japan	13 May 1958	67	19 Oct 2025		Tokyo, Japan	
W70	1:35:40	Christine Kennedy	Ireland	29 December 1954	71	23 August 2026		Antrim, Ireland	
W75	1:40:42	Jeannie Rice	United States	14 Apr 1948	75	11 Feb 2024		Melbourne, United States	
W80	2:02:10	Franca Maria Monasterolo	Italy	26 Sep 1943	80	5 Nov 2023		Turin, Italy	
W85	2:12:37	Deidre Larkin	South Africa	24 Sep 1931	85	4 Feb 2017		Pretoria, South Africa	
W90	4:49:25	Gladys Burrill	Canada	23 Nov 1918	93	11 Mar 2012		Honolulu, United States	

=== Marathon ===
Age group	Record	Athlete	Nationality	Birthdate	Age	Date	Meet	Place	Ref
W40 progression	2:22:27	Mariya Konovalova	Russia	14 August 1974	40	8 March 2015	Nagoya Women's Marathon	Nagoya, Japan	
W40 progression	2:19:52	Helalia Johannes	Namibia	13 August 1980	40	6 December 2020	Valencia Marathon	Valencia, Spain	
W40 progression	2:22:11	Lydia Cheromei	Kenya	11 May 1977	41	2 December 2018	Valencia Marathon	Valencia, Spain	
W45 progression	2:29:00	Tatyana Pozdnyakova	Ukraine	4 Mar 1955	46	13 Oct 2002		Providence, United States	
W45 progression	2:21:34	Sinead Diver	Australia	17 Feb 1977	45	4 Dec 2022	Valencia Marathon	Valencia, Spain	
W50 progression	2:31:05	Tatyana Pozdniakova	Ukraine	4 Mar 1955	50	6 Mar 2005	Los Angeles Marathon	Los Angeles, United States	
W55 progression	2:45:27	Jenny Hitchings	United States	1 July 1963	59	23 April 2023	London Marathon	London, United Kingdom	
W60 progression	2:49:43	Jenny Hitchings	United States	1 July 1963	60	8 October 2023	Chicago Marathon	Chicago, United States	
W65 progression	2:59:06	Mariko Yugeta	Japan	13 May 1958	67	16 Nov 2025	Kobe Marathon	Kobe, Japan	
W70 progression	3:23:59	Jennifer MacDonell	Canada	17 July 1956	70	18 October 2026	Toronto Waterfront Marathon	Toronto, Canada	
W75 progression	3:33:27	Jeannie Rice	USA	14 Apr 1948	76	18 Apr 2024	London Marathon	London, United Kingdom	
W80 progression	4:11:45	Yoko Nakano	Japan	12 Jan 1936	81	26 Feb 2017	Tokyo Marathon	Tokyo, Japan	
W85 progression	5:14:26	Betty Jean McHugh	Canada	7 Nov 1927	85	9 Dec 2012	Honolulu Marathon	Honolulu, United States	
W90	8:53:08	Mavis Lindgren	United States		90	28 Sep 1997	Portland Marathon	Portland, United States	
W90	6:47:31	Betty Jean McHugh	Canada	7 Nov 1927	90	10 Dec 2017	Honolulu Marathon	Honolulu, United States	
