= Marathon year rankings =

The following table shows the yearly rankings in the marathon since 1921 (men) and 1970 (women), based on the best performance in the classic distance race of 42.195 km (26 miles 385 yards).

The data for the women's marathon from 1970 to 1979 is compiled from the Association of International Marathons and Distance Races. All other data is compiled from the Association of Road Racing Statisticians.

== Men's year rankings ==
Key: Current world record

Year	Time	Athlete	Date	Place
1921	2:47:29.8	Florestano Benedetti (ITA)	1921-09-20	Bologna, Italy
1922	2:46:26	Gabriel Ruotsalainen (FIN)	1922-09-10	Helsinki, Finland
1923	2:40:47	Aksel Jensen (DEN)	1923-06-16	Windsor, England
1924	2:36:10	Shizo Kanaguri (JPN)	1924-04-12	Tokyo, Japan
1925	2:35:59	Sam Ferris (GBR)	1925-05-30	Windsor, England
1926	2:34:25	Iivari Rötkö (FIN)	1926-09-12	Helsinki, Finland
1927	2:35:21.4	Verner Laaksonen (FIN)	1927-09-11	Helsinki, Finland
1928	2:32:57	Boughera El Ouafi (FRA)	1928-08-05	Amsterdam, Netherlands
1929	2:30:57.6	Harry Payne (GBR)	1929-07-05	Stamford Bridge, England
1930	2:36:33	Fukutaro Shibui (JPN)	1930-05-28	Tokyo, Japan
1931	2:33:19	Juan Zabala (ARG)	1931-10-28	Košice, Slovakia
1932	2:31:31	Tanji Yahagi (JPN)	1932-04-30	Tokyo, Japan
1933	2:31:10	Kozo Kusunoki (JPN)	1933-11-03	Tokyo, Japan
1934	2:32:56	Tamao Shiwaku (JPN)	1934-11-23	Osaka, Japan
1935	2:26:14	Sohn Kee-Jung (JPN)	1935-03-21	Tokyo, Japan
1936	2:28:32	Sohn Kee-Jung (JPN)	1936-04-18	Tokyo, Japan
1937	2:30:38	Manuel Dias (POR)	1937-03-28	Lisbon, Portugal
1938	2:30:27.6	Pat Dengis (USA)	1938-05-30	Salisbury, Massachusetts, United States
1939	2:31:26	Toyu Go (JPN)	1939-11-03	Tokyo, Japan
1940	2:33:42	Shoichiro Takenaka (JPN)	1940-11-01	Tokyo, Japan
1941	2:31:27	Les Pawson (USA)	1941-05-30	Salisbury, Massachusetts, United States
1942	2:31:38	Zaiten Kimoto (JPN)	1942-11-02	Tokyo, Japan
1943	2:38:35.3	Gérard Côté (CAN)	1943-11-07	Yonkers, New York, United States
1944	2:40:48.6	Charles Robbins (USA)	1944-11-12	Yonkers, New York, United States
1945	2:36:37.6	Sven Håkansson (SWE)	1945-10-28	Gothenburg, Sweden
1946	2:31:37	Mikko Hietanen (FIN)	1946-07-11	Imatra, Finland
1947	2:30:58	Mikko Hietanen (FIN)	1947-08-23	Loughborough, England
1948	2:31:02	Mikko Hietanen (FIN)	1948-09-07	Stockholm, Sweden
1949	2:28:39.4	Salomon Könönen (FIN)	1949-10-02	Turku, Finland
1950	2:29:09.4	Feodosiy Vanin (URS)	1950-07-12	Moscow, Russia
1951	2:28:07.4	Veikko Karvonen (FIN)	1951-08-03	Tampere, Finland
1952	2:20:42.2	Jim Peters (GBR)	1952-06-14	Windsor, England
1953	2:18:34.8	Jim Peters (GBR)	1953-10-04	Turku, Finland
1954	2:17:39.4	Jim Peters (GBR)	1954-06-26	Chiswick, England
1955	2:21:21.6	Veikko Karvonen (FIN)	1955-09-04	Copenhagen, Denmark
1956	2:18:04.8	Paavo Kotila (FIN)	1956-08-12	Pieksämäki, Finland
1957	2:19:50	Sergei Popov (URS)	1957-09-01	Moscow, Russia
1958	2:15:17.6	Sergei Popov (URS)	1958-08-24	Stockholm, Sweden
1959	2:17:45.2	Sergei Popov (URS)	1959-11-11	Košice, Slovakia
1960	2:15:16.2	Abebe Bikila (ETH)	1960-09-10	Rome, Italy
1961	2:18:54	Takayuki Nakao (JPN)	1961-03-21	Nagoya, Japan
1962	2:16:09.6	Yu Mang-Hyang (PRK)	1962-10-24	Pyongyang, North Korea
1963	2:14:28	Leonard Edelen (USA)	1963-06-15	Chiswick, England
1964	2:12:11.2	Abebe Bikila (ETH)	1964-10-21	Tokyo, Japan
1965	2:12:00	Morio Shigematsu (JPN)	1965-06-12	Chiswick, England
1966	2:14:04.8	Michael Ryan (NZL)	1966-11-27	Fukuoka, Japan
1967	2:09:36.4	Derek Clayton (AUS)	1967-12-03	Fukuoka, Japan
1968	2:10:47.8	Bill Adcocks (GBR)	1968-12-08	Fukuoka, Japan
1969	2:08:33.6	Derek Clayton (AUS)	1969-05-30	Antwerp, Belgium
1970	2:09:28.8	Ron Hill (GBR)	1970-07-23	Edinburgh, Scotland
1971	2:11:08.8	Derek Clayton (AUS)	1971-09-25	Hobart, Australia
1972	2:10:30	Frank Shorter (USA)	1972-12-03	Fukuoka, Japan
1973	2:11:12.6	John Farrington (AUS)	1973-07-14	Richmond, South Australia
1974	2:09:12.0	Ian Thompson (GBR)	1974-01-31	Christchurch, New Zealand
1975	2:09:55	Bill Rodgers (USA)	1975-04-21	Boston, United States
1976	2:09:55.0	Waldemar Cierpinski (GDR)	1976-07-31	Montreal, Canada
1977	2:10:55.3	Bill Rodgers (USA)	1977-12-04	Fukuoka, Japan
1978	2:09:05.6	Shigeru So (JPN)	1978-02-05	Beppu, Japan
1979	2:09:27	Bill Rodgers (USA)	1979-04-16	Boston, United States
1980	2:09:01	Gerard Nijboer (NED)	1980-04-26	Amsterdam, Netherlands
1981	2:08:18	Robert de Castella (AUS)	1981-12-06	Fukuoka, Japan
1982	2:08:52	Alberto Salazar (USA)	1982-04-19	Boston, United States
1983	2:08:37	Robert de Castella (AUS)	1983-04-09	Rotterdam, Netherlands
1984	2:08:05	Steve Jones (GBR)	1984-10-21	Chicago, United States
1985	2:07:12	Carlos Lopes (POR)	1985-04-20	Rotterdam, Netherlands
1986	2:07:51	Robert de Castella (AUS)	1986-04-21	Boston, United States
1987	2:08:18	Takeyuki Nakayama (JPN)	1987-12-06	Fukuoka, Japan
1988	2:06:50	Belayneh Dinsamo (ETH)	1988-04-17	Rotterdam, Netherlands
1989	2:08:01	Juma Ikangaa (TAN)	1989-11-05	New York City, United States
1990	2:08:16	Steve Moneghetti (AUS)	1990-09-30	Berlin, Germany
1991	2:08:53	Koichi Morishita (JPN)	1991-02-03	Beppu, Japan
1992	2:08:07	David Tsebe (RSA)	1992-09-27	Berlin, Germany
1993	2:08:51	Dionicio Ceron (MEX)	1993-12-05	Fukuoka, Japan
1994	2:07:15	Cosmas Ndeti (KEN)	1994-04-18	Boston, United States
1995	2:07:02	Sammy Lelei (KEN)	1995-09-24	Berlin, Germany
1996	2:08:25	Martín Fiz (ESP)	1996-03-24	Kyong-Ju, South Korea
1997	2:07:10	Khalid Khannouchi (MAR)	1997-10-19	Chicago, United States
1998	2:06:05	Ronaldo da Costa (BRA)	1998-09-20	Berlin, Germany
1999	2:05:42	Khalid Khannouchi (MAR)	1999-10-24	Chicago, United States
2000	2:06:36	António Pinto (POR)	2000-04-16	London, UK
2001	2:06:50	Josephat Kiprono (KEN)	2001-04-22	Rotterdam, Netherlands
2002	2:05:37.8	Khalid Khannouchi (USA)	2002-04-14	London, UK
2003	2:04:55	Paul Tergat (KEN)	2003-09-28	Berlin, Germany
2004	2:06:14	Felix Limo (KEN)	2004-04-04	Rotterdam, Netherlands
2005	2:06:19.5	Haile Gebrselassie (ETH)	2005-10-16	Amsterdam, Netherlands
2006	2:05:56	Haile Gebrselassie (ETH)	2006-09-24	Berlin, Germany
2007	2:04:26	Haile Gebrselassie (ETH)	2007-09-30	Berlin, Germany
2008	2:03:58.2	Haile Gebrselassie (ETH)	2008-09-28	Berlin, Germany
2009	2:04:26.3	Duncan Kibet (KEN)	2009-04-05	Rotterdam, Netherlands
2010	2:04:48	Patrick Makau Musyoki (KEN)	2010-04-11	Rotterdam, Netherlands
2011	2:03:38	Patrick Makau Musyoki (KEN)	2011-09-11	Berlin, Germany
2012	2:04:15	Geoffrey Mutai (KEN)	2012-09-09	Berlin, Germany
2013	2:03:23	Wilson Kipsang Kiprotich (KEN)	2013-09-28	Berlin, Germany
2014	2:02:57	Dennis Kimetto (KEN)	2014-09-28	Berlin, Germany
2015	2:04:00	Eliud Kipchoge (KEN)	2015-09-27	Berlin, Germany
2016	2:03:03	Kenenisa Bekele (ETH)	2016-09-25	Berlin, Germany
2017	2:03:32	Eliud Kipchoge (KEN)	2017-09-24	Berlin, Germany
2018	2:01:39	Eliud Kipchoge (KEN)	2018-09-16	Berlin, Germany
2019	2:01:41	Kenenisa Bekele (ETH)	2019-09-29	Berlin, Germany
2020	2:03:00	Evans Chebet (KEN)	2020-12-06	Valencia, Spain
2021	2:03:36	Bashir Abdi (BEL)	2021-10-24	Rotterdam, Netherlands
2022	2:01:09	Eliud Kipchoge (KEN)	2022-10-25	Berlin, Germany
2023	2:00:35	Kelvin Kiptum (KEN)	2023-10-08	Chicago, United States
2024	2:02:05	Sabastian Sawe (KEN)	2024-12-01	Valencia, Spain
2025	2:02:16	Sabastian Sawe (KEN)	2025-09-21	Berlin, Germany
2026	1:59:30	Sabastian Sawe (KEN)	2026-06-26	London, UK

== Women's year rankings ==
Key: Current world record

Year	Time	Athlete	Date	Place
1970	3:02:53	Caroline Walker (USA)	1970-02-28	Seaside, United States
1971	2:46:30	Adrienne Beames (AUS)	1971-08-31	Werribee, Australia
1972	2:55:45	Cheryl Bridges (USA)	1972-08-12	Terre Haute, United States
1973	2:46:36	Michiko Gorman (USA)	1973-12-02	Culver City, United States
1974	2:43:55	Jacqueline Hansen (USA)	1974-12-01	Culver City, United States
1975	2:38:19	Jacqueline Hansen (USA)	1975-10-12	Eugene, United States
1976	2:39:11	Michiko Gorman (USA)	1976-10-24	New York, United States
1977	2:34:48	Christa Vahlensieck (FRG)	1977-09-10	West Berlin, West Germany
1978	2:32:30	Grete Waitz (NOR)	1978-10-22	New York, United States
1979	2:27:33	Grete Waitz (NOR)	1979-10-21	New York, United States
1980	2:25:41	Grete Waitz (NOR)	1980-10-26	New York, United States
1981	2:26:47	Allison Roe (NZL)	1981-04-20	Boston, United States
1982	2:26:12	Joan Benoit (USA)	1982-09-12	Eugene, United States
1983	2:22:43	Joan Benoit (USA)	1983-04-18	Boston, United States
1984	2:24:26	Ingrid Kristiansen (NOR)	1984-05-13	London, UK
1985	2:21:06	Ingrid Kristiansen (NOR)	1985-04-21	London, UK
1986	2:24:54	Grete Waitz (NOR)	1986-04-20	London, UK
1987	2:22:48	Ingrid Kristiansen (NOR)	1987-05-10	London, UK
1988	2:23:51	Lisa Martin (AUS)	1988-01-31	Osaka, Japan
1989	2:24:33	Ingrid Kristiansen (NOR)	1989-04-17	Boston, United States
1990	2:25:24	Rosa Mota (POR)	1990-04-16	Boston, United States
1991	2:24:18	Wanda Panfil (POL)	1991-04-15	Boston, United States
1992	2:23:43	Olga Markova (RUS)	1992-04-20	Boston, United States
1993	2:24:07	Wang Junxia (CHN)	1993-04-04	Tianjin, PR China
1994	2:21:45	Uta Pippig (GER)	1994-04-18	Boston, United States
1995	2:25:11	Uta Pippig (GER)	1995-04-17	Boston, United States
1996	2:26:04	Katrin Dörre (GER)	1996-01-28	Osaka, Japan
1997	2:22:07	Tegla Loroupe (KEN)	1997-04-20	Rotterdam, Netherlands
1998	2:20:47	Tegla Loroupe (KEN)	1998-04-19	Rotterdam, Netherlands
1999	2:20:43	Tegla Loroupe (KEN)	1999-09-26	Berlin, Germany
2000	2:21:33	Catherine Ndereba (KEN)	2000-10-22	Chicago, United States
2001	2:18:47	Catherine Ndereba (KEN)	2001-10-07	Chicago, United States
2002	2:17:17.7	Paula Radcliffe (GBR)	2002-10-13	Chicago, United States
2003	2:15:24.6	Paula Radcliffe (GBR)	2003-04-13	London, UK
2004	2:19:41	Yoko Shibui (JPN)	2004-09-26	Berlin, Germany
2005	2:17:42	Paula Radcliffe (GBR)	2005-04-17	London, UK
2006	2:19:36	Deena Kastor (USA)	2006-04-23	London, UK
2007	2:20:38	Zhou Chunxiu (CHN)	2007-04-22	London, UK
2008	2:19:19	Irina Mikitenko (GER)	2008-09-28	Berlin, Germany
2009	2:22:11	Irina Mikitenko (GER)	2009-04-26	London, UK
2010	2:22:04	Atsede Baysa (ETH)	2010-04-11	Paris, France
2011	2:19:19	Mary Keitany (KEN)	2011-04-17	London, UK
2012	2:18:37	Mary Keitany (KEN)	2012-04-22	London, UK
2013	2:19:57	Rita Jeptoo Sitienei (KEN)	2013-10-15	Chicago, USA
2014	2:20:18	Tirfi Tsegaye (ETH)	2014-09-28	Berlin, Germany
2015	2:19:25	Gladys Cherono (KEN)	2015-09-27	Berlin, Germany
2016	2:19:41	Tirfi Tsegaye (ETH)	2016-01-22	Dubai, United Arab Emirates
2017	2:17:01	Mary Keitany (KEN)	2017-04-23	London, UK
2018	2:18:11	Gladys Cherono (KEN)	2018-09-16	Berlin, Germany
2019	2:14:04	Brigid Kosgei (KEN)	2019-10-13	Chicago, USA
2020	2:17:16	Peres Jepchirchir (KEN)	2020-12-06	Valencia, Spain
2021	2:17:43	Joyciline Jepkosgei (KEN)	2021-10-03	London, UK
2022	2:14:18	Ruth Chepngetich (KEN)	2022-10-09	Chicago, United States
2023	2:11:53	Tigst Assefa (ETH)	2023-09-24	Berlin, Germany
2024	2:09:56	Ruth Chepngetich (KEN)	2024-10-13	Chicago, United States
2025	2:14:00	Joyciline Jepkosgei (KEN)	2025-12-07	Valencia, Spain

== See also ==
- National records in the marathon
- Marathon world record progression
- Masters M35 marathon world record progression
- Masters M40 marathon world record progression
- Masters M45 marathon world record progression
- Masters M50 marathon world record progression
- Masters M55 marathon world record progression
- Masters M60 marathon world record progression
- Masters M65 marathon world record progression
- Masters M70 marathon world record progression
- Masters M75 marathon world record progression
- Masters M80 marathon world record progression
- Masters M85 marathon world record progression
- Masters W35 marathon world record progression
- Masters W40 marathon world record progression
- Masters W45 marathon world record progression
- Masters W50 marathon world record progression
- Masters W55 marathon world record progression
- Masters W60 marathon world record progression
- Masters W65 marathon world record progression
- Masters W70 marathon world record progression
- Masters W75 marathon world record progression
- Masters W80 marathon world record progression
- Masters W85 marathon world record progression
