= Masters M80 3000 metres world record progression =

This is the progression of world record improvements of the 3000 metres M80 division of Masters athletics. Records must be set in properly conducted, official competitions under the standing IAAF rules unless modified by World Masters Athletics. The M80 division consists of male athletes who have reached the age of 80 but have not yet reached the age of 85, so exactly from their 80th birthday to the day before their 85th birthday.

Key

Incomplete information Pending better indoor records

Hand	Auto	Athlete	Nationality	Birthdate	Location	Date
	11:56.25+	Jose Vicente Rioseco Lopez	Spain	30 April 1941	Pontevedra	4 September 2021
	12:00.88i	Ed Whitlock	Canada	6 March 1931	Kamloops	19 March 2011
	12:13.56	Ed Whitlock	Canada	6 March 1931	Toronto	26 July 2011
13:05.3		Luciano Acquarone	Italy	4 October 1930	Imperia	2 July 2011
	13:09.48	Ed Benham	United States	12 July 1907	Raleigh	1 May 1989
13:17.0		Fritz Helber	Germany	20 December 1905	Stuttgart	14 September 1986
