= Masters M80 5000 metres world record progression =

This is the progression of world record improvements of the 5000 metres M80

Key

Incomplete information Pending

Hand	Auto	Athlete	Nationality	Birthdate	Location	Date
	20:20.01	Jose Vicente Rioseco Lopez	Spain	30 April 1941	Pontevedra	4 September 2021
	20:58.12	Ed Whitlock	Canada	6 March 1931	Toronto	18 June 2011
	21:46.86	Ed Benham	United States	12 July 1907		22 June 1989
	21:57.88	Ed Benham	United States	12 July 1907	Orlando	6 August 1988
	23:06.93	Fritz Helber	Germany	20 December 1905	Malmö	31 July 1986
23:18.3		Joseph Charbonneau	France	22 November 1903	Brighton	24 August 1984
	24:03.59	Enar Hjörtling	Sweden	10 May 1904	Kvarnsveden	3 August 1984
