= Masters M75 3000 metres world record progression =

This is the progression of world record improvements of the 3000 metres M75 division of Masters athletics. Records must be set in properly conducted, official competitions under the standing IAAF rules unless modified by World Masters Athletics. The M75 division consists of male athletes who have reached the age of 75 but have not yet reached the age of 80, so exactly from their 75th birthday to the day before their 80th birthday.

Key

Incomplete information Pending better indoor records

Hand	Auto	Athlete	Nationality	Birthdate	Age	Location	Date	Ref
10:58.7 h		Cees Stolwijk	Netherlands	10 January 1950	75 years, 230 days	Breda	28 August 2025	
	11:00.81 i	Cees Stolwijk	Netherlands	10 January 1950	75 years, 29 days	Apeldoorn	8 February 2025	
	11:10.43	Ed Whitlock	Canada	6 March 1931	75 years, 141 days	Toronto	25 July 2006	
	11:45.28	Luciano Acquarone	Italy	4 October 1930	75 years, 264 days	Chivasso	25 June 2006	
12:12.3 h		Antonio Nacca	Italy	16 December 1923	75 years, 193 days	Santhià	27 June 1999	
12:30.9 h		Heinrich Schultz	Germany	23 May 1913	75 years, 20 days	Heidesheim	12 June 1988	
