= Masters M75 10000 metres world record progression =

This is the progression of world record improvements of the 10000 metres M75 division of Masters athletics.

Key

Incomplete information Pending

Hand	Auto	Athlete	Nationality	Birthdate	Age	Location	Date	Ref
	39:08.28	Cees Stolwijk	Netherlands	10 January 1950	75 years, 258 days	Hengelo	25 September 2025	
	39:25.16	Ed Whitlock	Canada	6 March 1931	75 years, 139 days	Dieppe	23 July 2006	
39:31.7 h		Stephen Charlton	Great Britain	4 October 1926	75 years, 329 days	London	29 August 2002	
	41:59.06	John Keston	United States	5 December 1924	76 years, 186 days	Eugene	9 June 2001	
42:03.4 h		David Morrison	Great Britain	19 December 1913	75 years, 264 days	Coatbridge	9 September 1989	
42:34.8 h		Luis Rivera	Mexico	28 February 1902	75 years, 187 days	Los Angeles	3 September 1977	
