= John Keston =

Actor and marathoner (1924–2022)

- Born: Francis Douglas Arthur Keston; 5 December 1924; London, England
- Died: 13 February 2022 (aged 97); Minneapolis, Minnesota, U.S.
- Occupations: Actor; singer; record-holding runner
- Years active: 1975–2022
- Spouse: Anne
- Children: 6

Francis Douglas Arthur Keston (5 December 1924 – 13 February 2022), generally known as John Keston, was a British-born American stage actor and singer who was best known as a world record-breaking runner.

== Early life ==
Keston was born in London on 5 December 1924. He served in the Royal Air Force during World War II.

== Artist ==
Keston's best known acting performance may be his portrayal of Gehn, the complex villain from the video game Riven: The Sequel to Myst (1997). The character has developed a cult following. (A short scene in which Keston is heard singing "O Sole Mio" is hidden in the game, in a type of file known as an Easter egg. It was unscripted—filmed while Keston gave an impromptu performance when waiting between takes.)

In 1968, John Keston appeared with Juliet Prowse in the original West End (London) production of Neil Simon's Sweet Charity at the Prince of Wales Theatre, in the role of Vittorio Vidal, receiving billing directly below the title. The show was conceived, staged and choreographed by Bob Fosse (who also made significant but uncredited contributions to the book). Keston appears on the cast album of that production. He once recalled his audition for Neil Simon, who was bringing the hit show to London from Broadway. Being a trained singer, Keston wanted to be taken seriously as an actor. When asked if he could sing, he said, "A bit." He was taken aside for his vocal audition, gave an excellent performance, and got the job.

Charity was his only West End credit; he had previously appeared in London productions of Sleeping Beauty, House of Cards, The Ideal Husband, Private Lives, and Billy. He also toured in the revue Fol-De-Rols. British television appearances included Department S, Lord Byron, and U.F.O.

For a time, Keston made a living as a model; his print ads appeared in such magazines as Stern.

In 1974, Keston travelled to Washington, D.C., with the Royal Shakespeare Company's touring production of Sherlock Holmes, directed by Frank Dunlop, with artistic director Trevor Nunn. The company commenced its tour on 7 October at Kennedy Center's Eisenhower Theatre. A month later, the show began previews at Broadway's Broadhurst Theater, opened on 12 November, and ran 471 performances. It received four Tony nominations and two Tony Awards. It gave Keston his sole Broadway credit for his performance as Sir Edward Leighton.

(It was the eighth time that particular play—co-written by Sir Arthur Conan Doyle—was produced on Broadway, the first time being in 1899; it has not played on Broadway since. The full title of the play is Sherlock Holmes: Being a hitherto unpublished episode in the career of the great detective and showing his connection with the STRANGE CASE OF MISS FAULKNER.)

Keston continued his career in the US as a performing artist, appearing in summer stock, cabaret, and opera engagements. He also portrayed the photographer Alfred Stieglitz in a film.

Keston wrote, produced and performed a one-man show, Expressions of Aging. This two-act play with music reflects his love of history, acting, music, and the English language, on the theme of growing old. He performed selections from it until late in his life. The first act is straight acting—no music. Keston relates autobiographical episodes of his early days as an actor, when he would dash to the theatre by train with just enough time to make up. Then, in full view of the audience—and in almost no time—he puts on a dash of make-up, applies a wig and beard with spirit gum, and slips into a nightgown, to become the historian John Aubrey in his late life. Speaking in an English accent, Aubrey tells tales, complains about his ailments, and relates court gossip.

The second act is musical, performed with a piano accompanist. Poems, selections from Gerald Finzi's A Young Man's Exhortation, and other songs about the transition from youth to old age make up the act. Keston was a tenor, and employed his voice to cry out with a characteristically tremulous passion, to poignant effect.

== Scholar ==
Eventually, Keston and his family settled in Bemidji, Minnesota, where he had been recruited by Dr. Fulton Gallagher to teach voice in the music department of Bemidji State University. During his career there, he became the preferred vocal instructor for many students who went on to become accepted into graduate programs at the country's most prestigious music conservatories.

He appeared as The Jester in annual Madrigal Dinners, presented by The Bemidji Choir and The Chamber Singers under the direction of choral conductor Paul Brandvik. This role included the performance of Shall I, Mother, Shall I, a work by Brandvik for three choirs and tenor soloist. It tells the passion story from the viewpoint of a little child.

Keston presented voice recitals, performed with the Bemidji Opera Society both in full opera productions and in Opera Night (a sort of opera revue with Italian food), and continued to present his one-man show in the region. In addition to teaching private voice lessons, he gave classes in foreign diction for singers and assisted students with their voice recitals.

He wrote a thesis on composer Gerald Finzi, whose natural treatment of spoken cadence in his melodies appealed to Keston. His declamatory style of singing—appropriate for a Shakespearean actor—was well suited to Finzi's works.

While at BSU, he became increasingly serious about his running, and, between classes, sometimes trained by running up the five flights of stairs at Bangsberg Hall, the school's music and theatre facility.

== Athlete ==
Keston began running at age 55 to combat mild hypertension. On 30 September 2001, at age 76, he set a world age record when he ran a 3:22:59 marathon in the Portland Marathon. This was after a comeback following an accident that may have ended his running career. On 2 April 2005, at age 80, he ran the 15k in 59:00. In 1996, at age 71, he barely missed becoming the first runner over age 70 to break 3 hours in the marathon, as he posted a 3:00:58 at the 1996 Twin Cities Marathon. This is still the fastest ever marathon by a 71-year-old, although the Canadian runner Ed Whitlock subsequently ran a marathon in under 3 hours at age 72, 73 and 74. At ages 80 and 85, Keston set world age records for 12-kilometers in the Bloomsday Run in Spokane, Washington.

On 12 March 2005, at age 80, he became the oldest sub-7 miler in history at the USA Masters Indoor Track and Field Championship (Jacksons Track, Nampa, Idaho), running it in 6:48.02. However, although this was set at a US championship, and was more than a minute faster than the previous indoor record set by American Henry Sypniewski, who ran the mile in 7:51:9 at age 81 in June 2000, it was not ratified as an American record (see American records). The M80 world mile record has subsequently been improved by the Spanish runner Manuel Alonso Domingo, who ran 6:22.69 in 2017 (see List of world records in masters athletics). On 14 May 2005, Keston ran the mile in 6:48:2 in the Fountain of Youth Masters Mile at Canby High School, Canby, Oregon, but this was also not ratified as an American M80 record (see American records). At the same meeting, he also ran 3000m in 13:30:77, which was faster than the officially ratified American M80 record set by Ed Benham in 1990 (although Benham had run a faster time, never officially ratified, in 1989).

On 15 April 2005, Keston set a half-marathon M80 world record of 1:39:27, at the sixth annual Earth Day Half Marathon in St. Cloud, Minnesota. This is still the best time achieved by an 80-year-old, but was subsequently beaten as an M80 record by the Canadian runner Ed Whitlock, who ran 1:38:59 at the age of 81 in Milton, Ontario.

Keston often sang the American and Canadian national anthems at running events, at the starting line just before the race began, and was a popular invitee to races nationwide. He also presented lectures at these events, speaking about his experiences and challenges as a Masters athlete.

He holds the current, ratified M75 American records for 5000 meters, and 10,000 meters. He holds several other US world age records, and continued to compete in marathons and other track and field events.

The USA Track & Field inducted him into the USATF Masters Hall of Fame in 2001.

As of 2017, Keston was still running at age 92.

== Personal life and death ==
Keston became a U.S. citizen in 1995, and lived in Sunriver, Oregon, with his wife Anne. He latterly produced a memoir, with the working title Expressions of Aging. He had three children from his marriage to Anne; Pamela, John and Richard. Additionally, he also had three children from a previous marriage; Philip, Michael and Francesca.

Keston died from complications of COVID-19 in Minneapolis, on 13 February 2022, at the age of 97, during the COVID-19 pandemic in Minnesota.
