= Masters M40 marathon world record progression =

Marathon world records

Masters M40 marathon world record progression is the progression of world record improvements of the marathon M40 division of Masters athletics. Records must be set in properly conducted, official competitions under the standing IAAF rules unless modified by World Masters Athletics. The M40 division consists of male athletes who have reached the age of 40 but have not yet reached the age of 45, so exactly from their 40th birthday to the day before their 45th birthday. Marathon running is not normally seeded into age divisions so all of these records were set in marathon race open to most other age groups.

Key

Incomplete information Pending

Time	Athlete	Nationality	Birthdate	Age	Location	Date	Ref
2:04:19	Kenenisa Bekele	Ethiopia	13 June 1982	41 years, 173 days	Valencia	3 December 2023	
2:05:10	Tadesse Abraham	Switzerland	12 August 1982	41 years, 103 days	Berlin	24 September 2023	
2:05:53	Kenenisa Bekele	Ethiopia	13 June 1982	40 years, 111 days	London	2 October 2022	
2:06:25	Ayad Lamdassem	Spain	11 October 1981	40 years, 132 days	Seville	20 February 2022	
2:07:50	Mark Kiptoo	Kenya	21 June 1976	42 years, 129 days	Frankfurt	28 October 2018	
2:08:38	Kenneth Mungara	Kenya	9 July 1973	42 years, 269 days	Milan	3 April 2016	
2:08:42	Kenneth Mungara	Kenya	9 July 1973	41 years, 361 days	Brisbane	5 July 2015	
2:08:44	Kenneth Mungara	Kenya	9 July 1973	41 years, 277 days	Milan	12 April 2015	
2:08:46	Andrés Espinosa	Mexico	4 February 1963	40 years, 236 days	Berlin	28 September 2003	
2:10:32	Mohamed Ezzher	France	26 April 1960	40 years, 347 days	Paris	8 April 2001	
2:11:04	John Campbell	New Zealand	6 February 1949	41 years, 69 days	Boston	16 April 1990	
2:11:19	Jack Foster	New Zealand	23 May 1932	41 years, 253 days	Christchurch	31 January 1974	
2:14:54	Jack Foster	New Zealand	23 May 1932	40 years, 257 days	Kyoto	4 February 1973	
2:20:21	Luciano Acquarone	Italy	4 October 1930	41 years, 251 days	Brussels	11 June 1972	
2:24:09	Luciano Acquarone	Italy	4 October 1930	41 years, 210 days	Busto Arsizio	1 May 1972	
2:40:54	Viktor ("Väinö") Muinonen	Finland	30 December 1898	41 years, 240 days	Tampere	26 August 1940	
