= Masters M50 3000 metres world record progression =

This is the progression of world record improvements of the 3000 metres M50 division of Masters athletics. Records must be set in properly conducted, official competitions under the standing IAAF rules unless modified by World Masters Athletics. The M50 division consists of male athletes who have reached the age of 50 but have not yet reached the age of 55, so exactly from their 50th birthday to the day before their 55th birthday.

Key

Incomplete information Pending Better indoor record

Hand	Auto	Athlete	Nationality	Birthdate	Age	Location	Date	Ref
	8:36.23 i	Francis Kipkoech Bowen	Kenya	12 October 1973	51 years, 164 days	Gainesville	25 March 2025	
	8:37.73 i	Juan Antonio Cuadrillero	Spain	6 October 1971	50 years, 51 days	Ourense	26 November 2021	
	8:37.94	Antoni Bernado	Andorra	9 December 1966	51 years, 217 days	Granollers	14 July 2018	
8:41.2 h		Christian Geffrey	France	4 February 1954	50 years, 154 days	Maromme	7 July 2004	
8:50.3 h		Martin Rees	Great Britain	28 February 1953	50 years, 40 days	Aberdare	9 April 2003	
9:03.6 h		Luciano Acquarone	Italy	4 October 1930	52 years, 22 days	Imperia	16 October 1982	
