= Ginette Bedard =

French-American long-distance runner

Personal information
- Citizenship: United States
- Born: December 8, 1933 (age 92) Metz, France
- Years active: 2001–Present

Achievements and titles
- Personal bests: Marathon: 3:46:03 (2006); Half-marathon: 1:45:54 (2003)

Ginette Bedard (born December 8, 1933) is a French-American long-distance runner from Queens, New York. She is known for her participation in marathons since 2001, at the age of sixty-seven. In 2005, she set the U.S. marathon record for women aged 70–74. In 2008, at age seventy-four, she set the masters W75 marathon world record with a time of 4:08:31. As of 2020, she has participated in seventeen New York City Marathons, where she at times has been the oldest woman to participate.

She attributes her fitness despite her age to the practice of running ten miles a day along Howard Beach where she resides.

== Background ==
Bedard was born in Metz, France. She married a member of the Canadian Air Force and moved to Canada, then later to New York, where she became an American citizen. When interviewed by the New Yorker in 2019, she said she first became interested in physical fitness after watching the Jack LaLanne Show on a regular basis:

Jack LaLanne, he got me inspired...every day I watched him on TV, and also I work at the airport, and one person said, "I just finished a marathon."
"Marathon?" I said. "Oh, I could never be like those, they're superhuman. Gee, wait a minute – if he could do [it], so can I!"

== Running career ==
Bedard participated in her first New York City marathon in 2002, and according to the New York Road Runners has since ran in over 350 races, including 44 half-marathons and 20 marathons.

=== Notable marathoning achievements ===
Year	Competition	Venue	Position	Notes
2005	New York City Marathon	New York City, United States	5,248 (1st in age-graded, 2nd in age-group)	3:46:34 (former U.S. marathon record for women aged 70–74)
2008	New York City Marathon	New York City, United States	15,794 (1st in age-graded)	4:08:31 (Masters W75 marathon world record)
