= Masters M70 marathon world record progression =

Masters M70 marathon world record progression is the progression of world record improvements of the marathon M70 division of Masters athletics. Records must be set in properly conducted, official competitions under the standing IAAF rules unless modified by World Masters Athletics. The M70 division consists of male athletes who have reached the age of 70 but have not yet reached the age of 75, so exactly from their 70th birthday to the day before their 75th birthday. Marathon running is not normally seeded into age divisions so all of these records were set in marathon race open to most other age groups.

Key

Awaiting ratification Incomplete information Not ratified or later rescinded

Time	Athlete	Nationality	Birthdate	Age	Location	Date	Ref
2:54:19	Joseph Schoonbroodt	Netherlands	11 September 1950	71 years, 239 days	Visé	8 May 2022	
2:54:23 (Note: non-certified course)	Gene Dykes	United States	3 April 1948	70 years, 256 days	Jacksonville	15 December 2018	
2:54:48	Ed Whitlock	Canada	6 March 1931	73 years, 204 days	Toronto	26 September 2004	
2:59:09.3	Ed Whitlock	Canada	6 March 1931	72 years, 206 days	Toronto	28 September 2003	
3:00:23	Ed Whitlock	Canada	6 March 1931	70 years, 68 days	London	13 May 2001	
3:00:58	John Keston	United States	5 December 1924	71 years, 306 days	St. Paul	6 October 1996	
3:01:14	Warren Utes	United States	25 June 1920	70 years, 125 days	Chicago	28 October 1990	
3:03:04	John Gilmour	Australia	3 May 1919	70 years, 95 days	Perth	6 August 1989	
3:03:05	Clive Davies	United States	17 August 1915	71 years, 259 days	Pittsburgh	3 May 1987	
3:04:16	Clive Davies	United States	17 August 1915	70 years, 50 days	St. Paul	6 October 1985	
3:07:26	Monty Montgomery	United States	14 July 1906	71 years, 94 days	Santa Barbara	16 October 1977	
3:08:45	Einar Nordin	Sweden	3 July 1906	70 years, 43 days	Coventry	15 August 1976	
