= Masters M60 3000 metres world record progression =

This is the progression of world record improvements of the 3000 metres M60 division of Masters athletics. Records must be set in properly conducted, official competitions under the standing IAAF rules unless modified by World Masters Athletics. The M60 division consists of male athletes who have reached the age of 60 but have not yet reached the age of 65, so exactly from their 60th birthday to the day before their 65th birthday.

Key

Incomplete information Pending

Hand	Auto	Athlete	Nationality	Birthdate	Location	Date
	9:21.38	Yoshitsugu Iwanaga	Japan	19 July 1960	Saga	26 September 2020
	9:29.47	Ad Heijdens	Netherlands	17 November 1938	Etten Leur	27 June 2000
9:55.5		Svenn Eriksen	Sweden	20 August 1934	Gothenburg	27 October 1994
10:12.0		Luciano Acquarone	Italy	4 October 1930	Senigallia	1 October 1994
	10:23.62	Gino Endrizzi	Italy	15 March 1924	Turin	18 March 1984
