= Masters M60 10000 metres world record progression =

This is the progression of world record improvements of the 10000 metres M60 division of Masters athletics.

Key

Incomplete information Pending

Hand	Auto	Athlete	Nationality	Birthdate	Age	Location	Date	Ref
	33:32.09	John Meagher	Australia	13 September 1963	60 years, 319 days	Melbourne	28 July 2024	
	33:39.52	Yoshitsugu Iwanaga	Japan	19 July 1960	60 years, 132 days	Saga	28 November 2020	
33:57.6 h		Michael Hager	Great Britain	6 September 1950	62 years, 308 days	Sandy	11 July 2013	
	34:14.88	Luciano Acquarone	Italy	4 October 1930	60 years, 289 days	Turku	20 July 1991	
34:23.0 h		John Gilmour	Australia	3 May 1919	61 years, 207 days	Perth	26 November 1980	
35:19.8 h		Clive Davies	United States	17 August 1915	63 years, 2 days	Eugene	19 August 1978	
35:57.4 h		Erich Kruzycki	Germany					
