= Masters M45 marathon world record progression =

Masters M45 marathon world record progression is the progression of world record improvements of the marathon M45 division of Masters athletics. Records must be set in properly conducted, official competitions under the standing IAAF rules unless modified by World Masters Athletics. The M45 division consists of male athletes who have reached the age of 45 but have not yet reached the age of 50, so exactly from their 45th birthday to the day before their 50th birthday. Marathon running is not normally seeded into age divisions so all of these records were set in marathon race open to most other age groups.

Key

Incomplete information Pending

Time	Athlete	Nationality	Birthdate	Age	Location	Date	Ref
2:09:12	Mark Kiptoo	Kenya	21 June 1976	46 years, 306 days	Zürich	23 April 2023	
2:14:23	Bernard Lagat	United States	12 December 1974	45 years, 79 days	Atlanta	29 February 2020	
2:12:47	Kenneth Mungara	Kenya	7 September 1973	45 years, 164 days	Hong Kong	18 February 2019	
2:15:29	Reuben Chesang	Kenya	22 December 1962	46 years, 286 days	St. Paul	4 October 2009	
2:14:16	Jackson Kipngok	Kenya	16 August 1960	45 years, 201 days	Torreón	5 March 2006	
2:15:51	Kjell-Erik Stahl	Sweden	17 January 1946	45 years, 255 days	Berlin	29 September 1991	
2:16:58	Kjell-Erik Stahl	Sweden	17 January 1946	45 years, 135 days	Stockholm	1 June 1991	
2:17:29	Jack Foster	New Zealand	23 May 1932	46 years, 152 days	New York City	22 October 1978	
2:20:12	Erik Östbye	Sweden	25 January 1921	46 years, 305 days	Haninge	26 November 1967	
2:33:03	Viktor ("Väinö") Muinonen	Finland	30 December 1898	47 years, 203 days	Ruokolahti	21 July 1946	
