= Stockade-athon 15K =

The Stockade-athon 15K is a road running competition held annually in November in Schenectady, New York and over 1,000 runners participate. It is in the top 10 oldest 15K road races in the United States.
