= Masters W70 marathon world record progression =

Masters W70 marathon world record progression is the progression of world record improvements of the marathon W70 division of Masters athletics. Records must be set in properly conducted, official competitions under the standing IAAF rules unless modified by World Masters Athletics. The W70 division consists of female athletes who have reached the age of 70 but have not yet reached the age of 75, so exactly from their 70th birthday to the day before their 75th birthday. Marathon running is not normally seeded into age divisions so all of these records were set in marathon races open to most other age groups. Official records are based on gun time. Chip times are indicated by including a "c" after the time.

Key

Incomplete information Pending

Time	Athlete	Nationality	Birthdate	Age	Location	Date	Ref
3:23:59 (3:23:54c)	Jennifer MacDonell	Canada	17 July 1956	70 years, 93 days	Toronto	18 October 2026	
3:27:00 (3:26:40c)	Laurence Dupont Alnet	France	18 July 1954	70 years, 129 days	La Rochelle	24 November 2024	
3:28:46 (3:24:48c)	Jeannie Rice	United States	14 April 1948	71 years, 168 days	Berlin	29 September 2019	
3:34:50 (3:27:50c)	Jeannie Rice	United States	14 April 1948	70 years, 183 days	Chicago	14 October 2018	
3:35:29	Helga Miketta	Germany	23 March 1941	72 years, 204 days	Essen	13 October 2013	
3:37:05	Helga Miketta	Germany	23 March 1941	71 years, 205 days	Essen	14 October 2012	
3:41:23	Helga Miketta	Germany	23 March 1941	70 years, 200 days	Essen	9 October 2011	
3:45:04	Christa Wulf	Germany	11 December 1933	70 years, 129 days	Hamburg	18 April 2004	
3:48:14	Pat Trickett	Great Britain	2 October 1922	71 years, 1 day	Stone	3 October 1993	
4:09:04	Gerry Davidson	United States	12 March 1921	70 years, 271 days	San Diego	8 December 1991	
4:11:54 a	Marcie Trent	United States	22 December 1917	70 years, 82 days	Napa	13 March 1988	
4:34:08 a	Mavis Lindgren	United States	2 April 1907	73 years, 340 days	Napa	8 March 1981	
4:37:37	Mavis Lindgren	United States	2 April 1907	72 years, 160 days	Eugene	9 September 1979	
4:41:53	Mavis Lindgren	United States	2 April 1907	72 years, 160 days	San Francisco	8 July 1979	
4:42:49	Mavis Lindgren	United States	2 April 1907	71 years, 35 days	Weott	7 May 1978	
4:45:02	Mavis Lindgren	United States	2 April 1907	70 years, 253 days	Honolulu	11 December 1977	
