= Martín Fiz =

Spanish long-distance runner

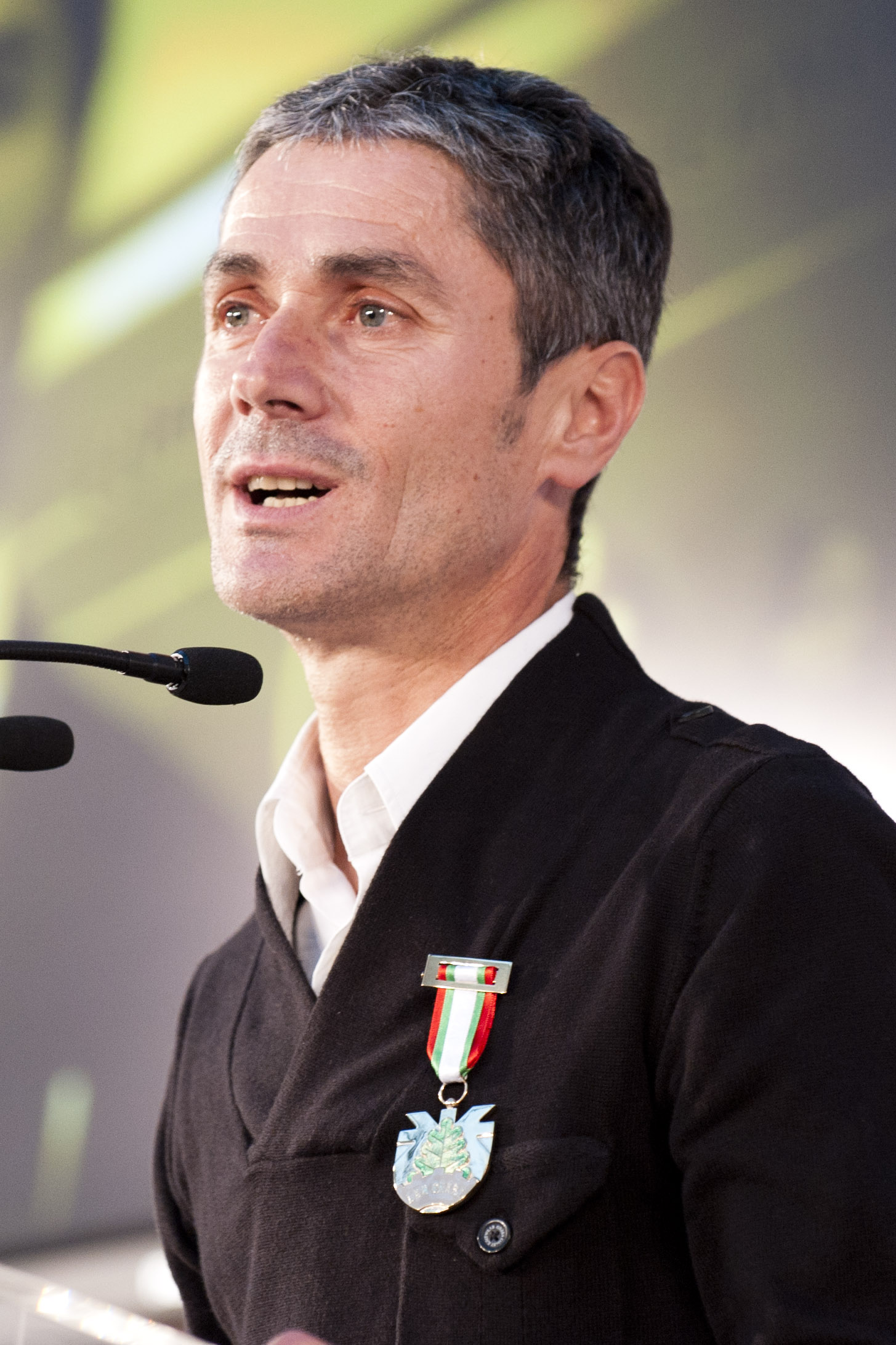

Medal record

Men's athletics

Representing Spain

World Championships
Gold medal – first place	1995 Gothenburg	Marathon
Silver medal – second place	1997 Athens	Marathon

European Championships
Gold medal – first place	1994 Helsinki	Marathon

Martín Fiz Martín (born 3 March 1963) is a Spanish former long-distance runner.

== Personal life ==
Martín Fiz Martín was born on 3 March 1963 in Vitoria-Gasteiz.

== Career ==
Fiz won the marathon at the 1994 European Athletics Championships in Helsinki and repeated his success at the 1995 World Athletics Championships in Gothenburg. The same year he captured the title in the Rotterdam Marathon.

At the 1996 Summer Olympics in Atlanta Fiz came fourth in the marathon. A year later he won a silver medal at the 1997 World Championships in Athletics in Athens, finishing behind his countryman Abel Anton.

He competed in three consecutive Summer Olympics for his native country, starting in 1992. At the 2000 Summer Olympics in Sydney Fiz came sixth in the marathon.

== Post-career ==
Fiz has continued running into masters age divisions, setting the world M55 record in the road 10K at 31:36 on 13 January 2019 in Valencia.

He is the only athlete in the world who has managed to win in six Majors Marathons in the Master 50 category (runners over 50 years old), winning the Marathons of New York, Tokyo, Boston, Berlin, Chicago, and London, achieving the goal of obtaining the 'Six World Marathon Majors', World Marathon Majors, an international competition created in 2006, which brings together six of the most prestigious world Marathons, recognised as the most high profile on the calendar.

== International competitions ==
Year	Competition	Venue	Position	Event	Notes
Representing Spain
1988	Ibero-American Championships	Mexico City, Mexico	1st	3000m steeplechase	9:05.21 A
1990	European Championships	Split, Yugoslavia	—	5000m	DNF
1992	Ibero-American Championships	Seville, Spain	3rd	5000m	13:57.99
1993	Helsinki City Marathon	Helsinki, Finland	1st	Marathon	2:12:47
1994	Boston Marathon	Boston, United States	10th	Marathon	2:10:21
1994	European Championships	Helsinki, Finland	1st	Marathon	2:10:31
1995	Rotterdam Marathon	Rotterdam, Netherlands	1st	Marathon	2:08:56
1995	World Championships	Gothenburg, Sweden	1st	Marathon	2:11:31
1996	Seoul International Marathon	Seoul, South Korea	1st	Marathon	2:08:25
1996	Summer Olympics	Atlanta, United States	4th	Marathon	2:13:20
1996	New York Marathon	New York City, United States	7th	Marathon	2:12:31
1997	Lake Biwa Marathon	Ōtsu, Japan	1st	Marathon	2:08:05
1997	World Championships	Athens, Greece	2nd	Marathon	2:13:21
1998	Lake Biwa Marathon	Ōtsu, Japan	2nd	Marathon	2:09:33
1999	Lake Biwa Marathon	Ōtsu, Japan	1st	Marathon	2:08:50
1999	World Championships	Seville, Spain	8th	Marathon	2:16:17
1999	New York Marathon	New York City, United States	9th	Marathon	2:12:03
2000	Lake Biwa Marathon	Ōtsu, Japan	1st	Marathon	2:08:14
2000	Summer Olympics	Sydney, Australia	6th	Marathon	2:13:24
2001	Madrid Millenium Marathon	Madrid, Spain	7th	Marathon	2:17:11

== Personal bests ==
Event	Time	Date	Location
1500 metres	3:44.00	1 January 1988	
3000 metres	07:50.17	30 July 1990	Getxo
3000 metres steeplechase	08:28.90	18 June 1988	Getxo
5000 metres	13:20.01	17 July 1991	Rome
10,000 metres	27:49.61	1 July 1998	Barakaldo
Half marathon	1:01:08	29 September 1996	Grevenmacher
Marathon	2:08:05	2 March 1997	Ōtsu
