= Mike Fremont =

American centenarian athlete (born 1922)

- Born: February 23, 1922 (age 104); Cincinnati, Ohio, U.S.
- Citizenship: United States
- Occupations: Long-distance runner, canoeist, environmentalist
- Years active: 1990s–present
- Known for: Age-group marathon records
- Spouse: Marilyn Wall (m. 1993)

Mike Fremont (born February 23, 1922) is an American long-distance runner and environmental advocate known for setting multiple age-group records in marathon and long-distance running events. He is also known for his advocacy of plant-based diets.

== Career ==
Fremont was a mechanical engineer who established his own business in Cincinnati in 1948 and retired in 1988. He began competitive running in his 60s. He also began canoe racing at age 40 and continued past age 100.

He has held single-age world records in the marathon for ages 80, 90, and 100, and has completed official races in his centenarian years. In 2012, at the Marshall University Marathon in Huntington, West Virginia, Fremont completed the marathon in 6 hours, 35 minutes, and 47 seconds. This set a world record for the M90 group.

== Environmentalism ==
Fremont became an environmentalist in 1962 after reading Rachel Carson’s Silent Spring. In 1966 he became an advocate of protecting and restoring rivers. He has commented that "my main concern is for our planet: global warming and sustainability. We have a small group seeking ways to improve our international solutions to avoid certain extinction. We meet regularly on this and read profusely. And worry!"

== Personal life ==
Fremont resides in Cincinnati, Ohio. His first wife died in 1958 from a brain haemorrhage. He married Marilyn Wall in 1993.

Fremont was diagnosed with colon cancer at aged 69. He refused surgery and adopted a plant-based diet in 1991. Two years later when the tumour was removed the doctors found that the cancer had not spread in his body. He has suggested that the Standard American diet caused his colon cancer as he was consuming such a diet for decades. He credits his longevity to his plant-based diet, vegan lifestyle and daily movement. In 2018 at aged 96, Fremont stated "the reason I continue to run (and race canoes long distance) is simply because I can. And in 27 years of being vegan, I’m convinced it’s this diet plus freedom from undue stress that is actually responsible for my activity at this age." His diet consists of almond milk, fresh fruit and vegetables, legumes, whole grains, mushrooms, potatoes and tofu.
