= Masters M85 marathon world record progression =

Masters M85 marathon world record progression is the progression of world record improvements of the marathon M85 division of Masters athletics. Records must be set in properly conducted, official competitions under the standing IAAF rules unless modified by World Masters Athletics. The M85 division consists of male athletes who have reached the age of 85 but have not yet reached the age of 90, so exactly from their 85th birthday to the day before their 90th birthday. Marathon running is not normally seeded into age divisions so all of these records were set in marathon race open to most other age groups.

Key

Incomplete information Pending

Time	Athlete	Nationality	Birthdate	Location	Date	Ref
3:56:38	Ed Whitlock	Canada	6 March 1931	Toronto	16 October 2016	
4:34:55	Robert Horman	Australia	1 May 1918	Gold Coast	4 July 2004	
4:47:50	Josef Galia	Germany	20 February 1898	Rodenbach	6 October 1984	
5:40:10	Ivor Welch	United States	19 January 1895	Weott	3 May 1981	
5:55:11	Ivor Welch	United States	19 January 1895	San Mateo	1 June 1980	
5:57:01	Ivor Welch	United States	19 January 1895	Weott	4 May 1980	
