= Masters M75 marathon world record progression =

Masters M75 marathon world record progression is the progression of world record improvements of the marathon M75 division of Masters athletics. Records must be set in properly conducted, official competitions under the standing IAAF rules unless modified by World Masters Athletics. The M75 division consists of male athletes who have reached the age of 75 but have not yet reached the age of 80, so exactly from their 75th birthday to the day before their 80th birthday. Marathon running is not normally seeded into age divisions so all of these records were set in marathon race open to most other age groups.

Key

Incomplete information Pending

Time	Athlete	Nationality	Birthdate	Location	Date
3:04:53.4	Ed Whitlock	Canada	6 March 1931	Rotterdam	15 April 2007
3:08:34.5	Ed Whitlock	Canada	6 March 1931	Toronto	24 September 2006
3:10:57a	Luciano Acquarone	Italy	4 October 1930	Carpi	16 October 2005
3:18:10	Warren Utes	United States	25 June 1920	Chicago	15 October 1995
3:23:12	Gordon Porteous	United Kingdom	20 February 1914	Bruges	25 June 1989
3:31:42	Friedrich Tempel	Germany	15 December 1901	Essen	21 October 1978
3:47:20	Louis Gregory	United States	10 July 1902	Gothenburg	13 August 1977
