= Toronto Waterfront Marathon =

Annual road-running race in Toronto, Canada

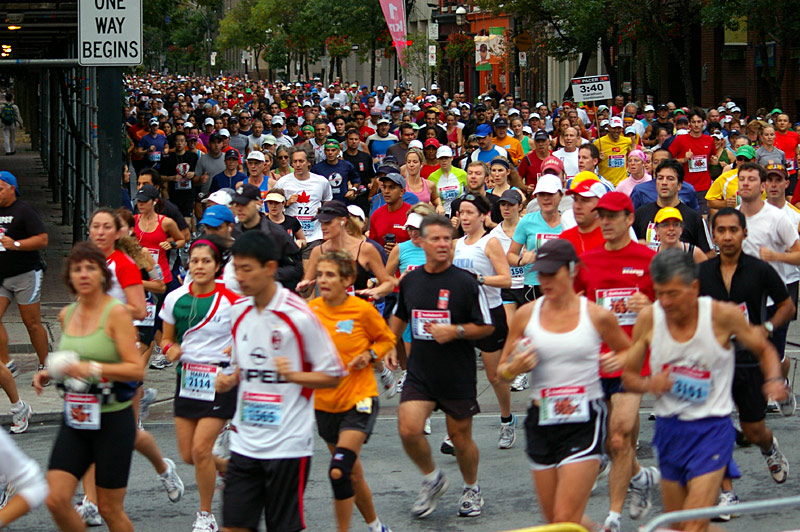
- 2008 Toronto Waterfront Marathon
- Date: Mid-October
- Location: Toronto, Ontario, Canada
- Event type: Road
- Distance: Marathon
- Primary sponsor: TCS
- Established: 2000
- Course records: Men's: 2:05:00 (2019) (Kenya) Philemon Rono; Women's: 2:20:44 (2024) (Ethiopia) Waganesh Mekasha
- Website: Toronto Waterfront Marathon
- Participants: 3,537 (2018); 3,835 (2019)

The Toronto Waterfront Marathon is a road-running race held in Toronto, Ontario, Canada, every year in the second or third Sunday of October. Aside from the actual marathon, the race also includes a half-marathon. The Toronto Waterfront Marathon is considered Canada's most prestigious road race, also acting as the nation's time-trial event during Olympic cycles.

The race is one of the elite label marathons in the World Athletics Label Road Races. At the 2013 edition of the race, race winner Deressa Chimsa broke the men's course record with the fastest marathon ever recorded on Canadian soil. In the 2011 edition of the race, race winner Koren Jelela Yal broke the women's course record with the fastest marathon ever recorded on Canadian soil. Canadian runner Ed Whitlock set multiple age group world records at the Waterfront Marathon, including a record in the 75 to 79 age group with a time of 3:08:35 in 2006, and a record in the 85 to 89 age group with a time of 3:56:33 in 2016.

In the 2018 race, Cam Levins broke Jerome Drayton's 43-year-old Canadian men's national record for the marathon, finishing fourth in 2:09:25, a 44-second improvement on the previous mark set by Drayton in 1975.

The 2020 in-person race was cancelled due to concerns surrounding the global COVID-19 coronavirus pandemic (as was the case for the May 2020 Goodlife Fitness Toronto Marathon event), although virtual races were to be held instead from October 1 to 31, 2020 instead.

In 2024, organizers announced that the marathon and half-marathon would occur on Sunday, and the 5K race will be held on the Saturday.

== Winners ==
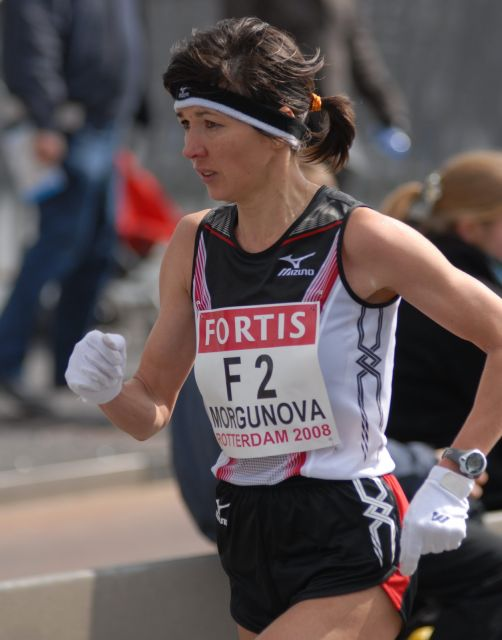
Russia's Lyubov Morgunova was the women's winner in 2003.

Key: Course record

Edition	Year	Men's winner	Time (h:m:s)	Women's winner	Time (h:m:s)
1st	2000	Joseph Nderitu (KEN)	2:19:41.4	Sue Grise (CAN)	3:08:38.2
2nd	2001	Daniel Howat (CAN)	2:45:20.8	Leslie Gold (USA)	3:07:10.1
3rd	2002	Stephane Gamache (CAN)	2:25:24.5	Nicole Stevenson (CAN)	2:37:56.4
4th	2003	Joseph Nderitu (KEN)	2:17:50.0	Lyubov Morgunova (RUS)	2:36:19.5
5th	2004	Danny Kassap (COD)	2:14:50.0	Lioudmila Kortchaguina (RUS)	2:36:31.9
6th	2005	Simon Kipruto (KEN)	2:11:56.5	Anastasia Ndereba (KEN)	2:36:30.8
7th	2006	Daniel Rono (KEN)	2:10:14.6	Małgorzata Sobańska (POL)	2:34:31.7
8th	2007	John Kelai (KEN)	2:09:30.0	Asha Gigi (ETH)	2:33:15.7
9th	2008	Kenneth Mungara (KEN)	2:11:00.9	Mulu Seboka (ETH)	2:29:05.9
10th	2009	Kenneth Mungara (KEN)	2:08:31.9	Amane Gobena (ETH)	2:28:30.4
11th	2010	Kenneth Mungara (KEN)	2:07:57.1	Sharon Cherop (KEN)	2:22:42.8
12th	2011	Kenneth Mungara (KEN)	2:09:49.0	Koren Jelela (ETH)	2:22:42.5
13th	2012	Sahle Warga (ETH)	2:10:35.8	Mary Davies (NZL)	2:28:55.4
14th	2013	Deressa Chimsa (ETH)	2:07:04.8	Flomena Cheyech (KEN)	2:25:13.0
15th	2014	Laban Korir (KEN)	2:08:15	Mulu Seboka (ETH)	2:23:15
16th	2015	Ishhimael Chemtan (KEN)	2:09:00	Shure Demise (ETH)	2:23:37
17th	2016	Philemon Rono (KEN)	2:08:26	Shure Demise (ETH)	2:25:16
18th	2017	Philemon Rono (KEN)	2:06:52	Marta Megra (ETH)	2:28:20
19th	2018	Benson Kipruto (KEN)	2:07:24	Mimi Belete (BHR)	2:22:28
20th	2019	Philemon Rono (KEN)	2:05:00	Magdalyne Masai (KEN)	2:22:16
2020	Event cancelled due to COVID-19 coronavirus concerns				
21st	2022	Yihunilign Adane (ETH)	2:07:18	Antonina Kwambai (KEN)	2:23:20
22nd	2023	Elvis Kipchoge Cheboi (KEN)	2:09:20	Buze Diriba Kejela (ETH)	2:23:11
23rd	2024	Mulugeta Asefa Uma (ETH)	2:07:16	Waganesh Mekasha (ETH)	2:20:44
24th	2025	Leonard Langat (KEN)	2:08:04	Shure Demise (ETH)	2:21:03
25th	2026	Leonard Langat (KEN)	2:06:51	Leah Jeruto (KEN)	2:21:19

=== Multiple wins ===
Men's
Athlete	Wins	Years
Kenneth Mungara (KEN)	4	2008, 2009, 2010, 2011
Philemon Rono (KEN)	3	2016, 2017, 2019
Joseph Nderitu (KEN)	2	2000, 2003

Women's
Athlete	Wins	Years
Mulu Seboka (ETH)	2	2008, 2014
Shure Demise (ETH)	3	2015, 2016, 2025

=== By country ===
Country	Total	Men's	Women's
Kenya	22	17	5
Ethiopia	15	4	11
Canada	4	2	2
Russia	2	0	2
United States	1	0	1
Democratic Republic of the Congo	1	1	0
Poland	1	0	1
New Zealand	1	0	1
Bahrain	1	0	1

== Charities ==
The Scotiabank Toronto Waterfront Marathon has successfully raised millions of dollars for charity since its inception. The largest charity attending the marathon for the past three years has been the Engineers Without Borders organization, which uses donations from the marathon for its Run to End Poverty initiative.

== See also ==
- List of marathon races in North America
