= Masters M60 marathon world record progression =

Masters M60 marathon world record progression is the progression of world record improvements of the marathon M60 division of Masters athletics. Records must be set in properly conducted, official competitions under the standing IAAF rules unless modified by World Masters Athletics. The M60 division consists of male athletes who have reached the age of 60 but have not yet reached the age of 65, so exactly from their 60th birthday to the day before their 65th birthday. Marathon running is not normally seeded into age divisions so all of these records were set in marathon race open to most other age groups.

Key

Incomplete information Pending

Time	Athlete	Nationality	Birthdate	Age	Location	Date	Ref
2:28:28	Mohammed El Yamani	France	4 September 1964	61 years, 164 days	Seville	15 February 2026	
2:30:02	Tommy Hughes	Ireland	8 January 1960	60 years, 291 days	Lisburn	25 October 2020	
2:36:30	Yoshihisa Hosaka	Japan	5 January 1949	60 years, 27 days	Beppu	1 February 2009	
2:38:15	Luciano Acquarone	Italy	4 October 1930	60 years, 297 days	Turku	28 July 1991	
2:38:47	Derek Turnbull	New Zealand	5 December 1926	60 years, 226 days	Adelaide	19 July 1987	
2:41:07	John Gilmour	Australia	3 May 1919	62 years, 202 days	Albany	21 November 1981	
2:41:25	Karl Hasler	Switzerland	22 March 1919	61 years, 154 days	Glasgow	23 August 1980	
2:42:44	Clive Davies	United States	17 August 1915	64 years, 72 days	Portland	28 October 1979	
2:47:46	Clive Davies	United States	17 August 1915	60 years, 56 days	Medford	12 October 1975	
2:51:17	Gordon Porteous	Great Britain	20 February 1914	61 years, 178 days	Toronto	17 August 1975	
