= Masters M80 marathon world record progression =

Masters M80 marathon world record progression is the progression of world record improvements of the marathon M80 division of Masters athletics. Records must be set in properly conducted, official competitions under the standing IAAF rules unless modified by World Masters Athletics. The M80 division consists of male athletes who have reached the age of 80 but have not yet reached the age of 85, so exactly from their 80th birthday to the day before their 85th birthday. Marathon running is not normally seeded into age divisions so all of these records were set in marathon race open to most other age groups.

Key

Incomplete information Pending

Time	Athlete	Nationality	Birthdate	Location	Date
3:15:54	Ed Whitlock	Canada	6 March 1931	Toronto	16 October 2011
3:25:43	Ed Whitlock	Canada	6 March 1931	Rotterdam	10 April 2011
3:39:18	Robert Horman	Australia	1 May 1918	Brisbane	24 May 1998
3:43:27	Ed Benham	United States	12 July 1907	St. Paul	11 October 1987
4:43:02	Erik Bergman	Sweden	2 October 1906	Stockholm	30 May 1987
4:50:00	Paul Spangler	United States	18 March 1899	Weott	4 May 1980
