= Luciano Acquarone =

Italian athlete (1930–2024)

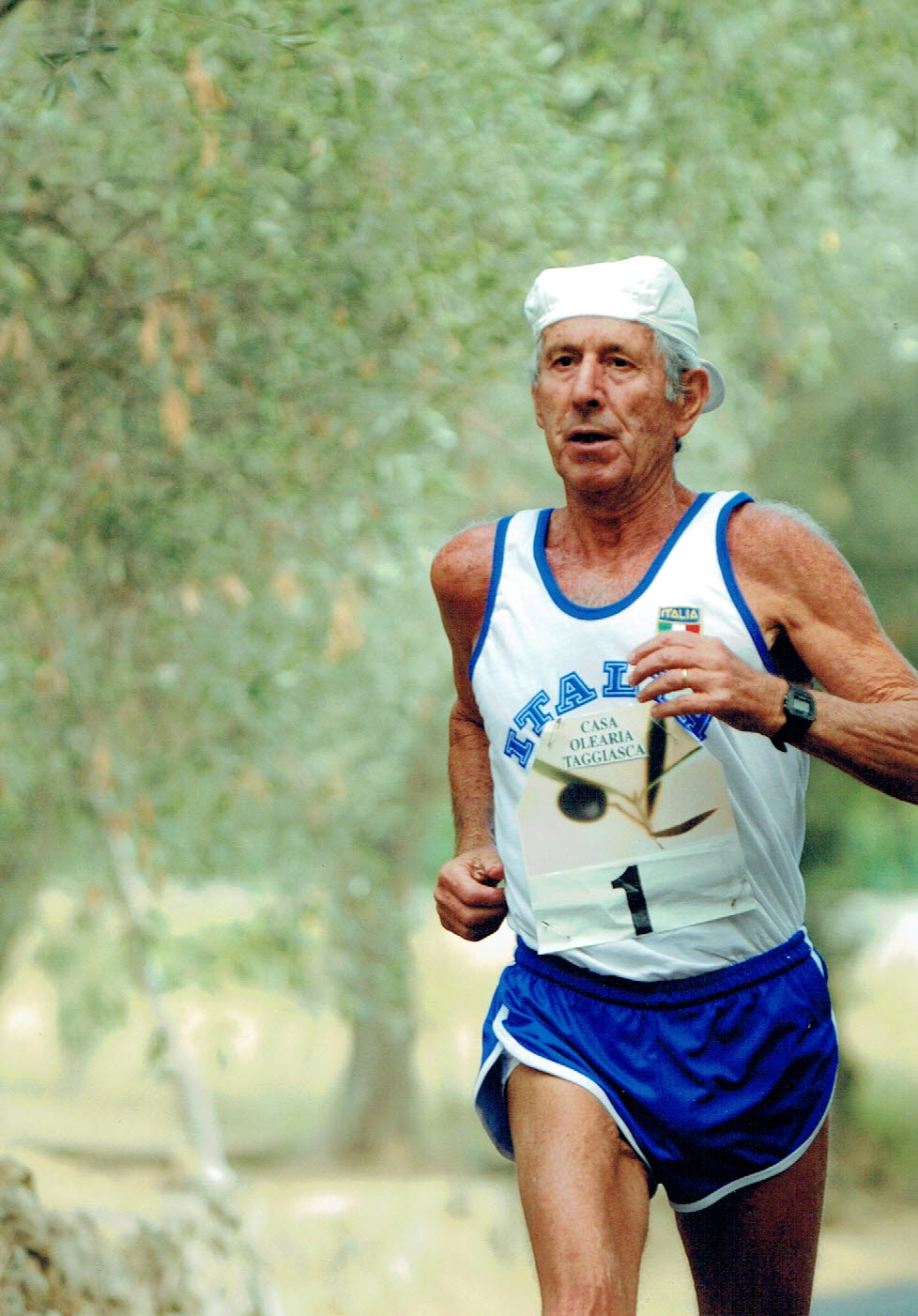

Personal information
- Nationality: Italian
- Born: 4 October 1930 Imperia, Italy
- Died: 17 June 2024 (aged 93) Imperia, Italy

Sport
- Country: Italy (3 caps senior)
- Sport: Athletics; Masters athletics
- Event: Long-distance running
Medal record
Masters athletics
Event	1st	2nd	3rd
World Championships	19	6	1
European Championships	18	4	1
Total	37	10	2

Luciano Acquarone (4 October 1930 – 17 June 2024) was an Italian athlete, known for his numerous long distance running world records in masters athletics marked in a period of 43 years, between 1972 and 2015, in the categories M40 to M85.

== Biography ==
=== Career ===
Acquarone started running at age 16, competing and also later coaching for various clubs; SC Borgo Peri, US Maurina (a company of which he was also a coach, sporting director and chairman), GS Riviera dei Fiori, Pedal Blue, CUS Torino and Olimpia Amateurs Rimini. Club affiliations are important to the Italian system. He started running middle distance races early in his career, achieving success to the regional level, but no national recognition. But he persisted.

At age 37, work duties forced him to take a year off. The following year, in 1969, he expected to renew his athletics card with FIDAL, the Italian national governing body, but the Federation's "Federal Laws" Article 8, Paragraph 1 prohibited registering athletes over age 35 who had taken a break in competition. While he continued to compete in road races, it took a protracted battle and pressure on then FIDAL President Primo Nebiolo to prove his fitness and ultimately win his card to allow him to continue competing. This case is considered a cornerstone to the establishment of the Masters age divisions in Italy, generally unheard of in 1971 and opening the door to athletes competing with no age limit. A year after that, at age 41, Acquarone finished second, just nine seconds behind the winner in the Italian National Championships Marathon in Rassina which should have qualified him to run in the 1972 Summer Olympics but he was not selected, possibly due to his age.

In the ensuing years Acquarone won numerous international races, the 1973 International Cross Country meet in Monte Carlo, the Vallecrosia Marathon and the Marseille Marathon. From 1977 to 1980, tendonitis set in and during the long recovery, Acquarone took to cycling, racing in Italy and France. He returned to racing in 1981 at age 50 where he first started setting what has become 7 world records and an additional six European records. He has held the M50, M60 and M75 world records for 3000 metres; the M50 and M60 world record for the 10000 metres; and the M60 and M75 world record for the marathon.

=== Personal life ===
Acquarone resided in Imperia and was married to his wife Anna, and worked for the same company Peter Isnardi for 40 years, receiving the "Loyalty at Work" Award from the Chamber of Commerce.

In 2005 he was awarded a knighthood in the Order of Merit of the Italian Republic

Acquarone died on 17 June 2024, at the age of 93.

== World records ==
Masters athletics

- Half marathon M85: 1:58:32 , (Italy) Sanremo, 6 October 2015, current holder.
- 3000 m M80: 13:05.3 ( (Italy) Imperia), 2 July 2011, until 26 July 2011 (broken by Ed Whitlock).
- 3000 m M75: 11:45.28 ( (Italy) Chivasso), 25 June 2006, until 25 July 2006 (broken by Ed Whitlock).
- Marathon M75: 3:10:57 ( (Italy) Imperia), 16 October 2005, until 24 September 2006 (broken by Ed Whitlock).
- 3000 m M60: 10:12.0 ( (Italy) Sinigaglia), 1 October 1994, until 27 October 1994.
- 10,000 m M60: 34:14.88 ( (Finland) Turku), 20 July 1991, until 11 July 2013.
- Marathon M60: 2:38:15 ( (Finland) Turku), 28 July 1991, until 1 February 2009.
- 3000 m M50: 9:03.6 ( (Italy) Imperia), 4 October 1982, until 9 April 2003.
- 10,000 m M50: 32:05.5 ( (Italy) Genoa), 17 October 1981, until 1 May 1989.
- Marathon M40: 2:20:21 ( (Belgium) Brussels), 11 June 1972, until 4 February 1973.

== See also ==
- List of European records in masters athletics
- List of Italian records in masters athletics
