= Masters W85 marathon world record progression =

Masters W85 marathon world record progression is the progression of world record improvements of the marathon W85 division of Masters athletics. Records must be set in properly conducted, official competitions under the standing IAAF rules unless modified by World Masters Athletics. The W85 division consists of female athletes who have reached the age of 85 but have not yet reached the age of 90, so exactly from their 85th birthday to the day before their 90th birthday. Marathon running is not normally seeded into age divisions so all of these records were set in marathon race open to most other age groups.

Key

Incomplete information Pending

Time	Athlete	Nationality	Birthdate	Location	Date
5:14:26	Betty Jean McHugh	Canada	07.11.1927	Honolulu	09.12.2012
5:36:15	Helen Klein	United States	27.11.1922	Napa Valley	02.03.2008
5:40:52	Ruth Rothfarb	United States	18.06.1901	Washington	02.11.1986
