= Tommy Hughes (runner) =

Irish long-distance runner

Personal information
- Nationality: Irish
- Born: 8 January 1960 (age 65)

Sport
- Sport: Long-distance running
- Event: Marathon

Tommy Hughes (born 8 January 1960) is an Irish long-distance runner. He competed in the men's marathon at the 1992 Summer Olympics. In 1988 he won the Marrakech Marathon in Morocco with a time of 2:15:48. In October 2019, aged 59, he ran the Frankfurt Marathon in a time of 2:27:52, a world record for his age. His son Eoin Hughes, aged 34, finished the same race in 2 hours 31 minutes 30 seconds. Their combined time of 4:59.22 was the fastest ever by a father-son duo in a marathon. On 24 October 2020 he ran the marathon in 2:30:02 at age 60 to break the ratified age group record by over 6 minutes.
