= Masters W65 marathon world record progression =

Masters W65 marathon world record progression is the progression of world record improvements of the marathon W65 division of Masters athletics. Records must be set in properly conducted, official competitions under the standing IAAF rules unless modified by World Masters Athletics. The W65 division consists of female athletes who have reached the age of 65 but have not yet reached the age of 70, so exactly from their 65th birthday to the day before their 70th birthday. Marathon running is not normally seeded into age divisions so all of these records were set in marathon race open to most other age groups.

Key

Incomplete information Pending

Time	Athlete	Nationality	Birthdate	Age	Location	Date	Ref
2:59:02 (2:58:59c)	Mariko Yugeta	Japan	13 May 1958	67 years, 187 days	Kobe	16 November 2025	
3:01:06 (3:01:05c)	Mariko Yugeta	Japan	13 May 1958	66 years, 286 days	Himeji	23 February 2025	
3:01:28	Mariko Yugeta	Japan	13 May 1958	65 years, 169 days	Tokyo	3 March 2024	
3:04:30	Mariko Yugeta	Japan	13 May 1958	65 years, 169 days	Mito City	29 October 2023	
3:07:21	Junko Nakayama	Japan	23 December 1957	65 years, 79 days	Nagoya	12 March 2023	
3:07:51	Kimi Ushiroda	Japan	28 February 1954	65 years, 290 days	Hōfu	15 December 2019	
3:12:57	Emmi Lüthi	Switzerland	1 March 1944	65 years, 56 days	Zürich	26 April 2009	
3:21:18 a	Margaret Miller	United States	12 December 1925	68 years, 357 days	Sacramento	4 December 1994	
3:28:10	Lieselotte Schulz	Germany	7 May 1920	65 years, 145 days	Berlin	29 September 1985	
3:47:24 a	Marcie Trent	United States	22 December 1917	65 years, 117 days	Boston	18 April 1983	
3:49:26	Marcie Trent	United States	22 December 1917	65 years, 137 days	Girdwood	8 May 1983	
