= Masters M65 marathon world record progression =

Masters M65 marathon world record progression is the progression of world record improvements of the marathon M65 division of Masters athletics. Records must be set in properly conducted, official competitions under the standing IAAF rules unless modified by World Masters Athletics. The M65 division consists of male athletes who have reached the age of 65 but have not yet reached the age of 70, so exactly from their 65th birthday to the day before their 70th birthday. Marathon running is not normally seeded into age divisions so all of these records were set in marathon race open to most other age groups.

Key

Incomplete information Pending

Time	Athlete	Nationality	Birthdate	Location	Date
2:41:57	Derek Turnbull	New Zealand	5 December 1926	London	12 April 1992
2:42:49	Clive Davies	United States	17 August 1915	Eugene	13 September 1981
2:43:57a	Clive Davies	United States	17 August 1915	Boston	20 April 1981
2:51:27	Clive Davies	United States	17 August 1915	Seaside	28 February 1981
2:53:03	Monty Montgomery	United States	14 July 1906	Culver City	5 December 1971
