= Masters W80 marathon world record progression =

Masters W80 marathon world record progression is the progression of world record improvements of the marathon W80 division of Masters athletics. Records must be set in properly conducted, official competitions under the standing IAAF rules unless modified by World Masters Athletics. The W80 division consists of female athletes who have reached the age of 80 but have not yet reached the age of 85, so exactly from their 80th birthday to the day before their 85th birthday. Marathon running is not normally seeded into age divisions so all of these records were set in marathon race open to most other age groups.

Key

Incomplete information Pending

Time	Athlete	Nationality	Birthdate	Location	Date
4:11:45	Yoko Nakano	Japan	12.01.1936	Tokyo	26.02.2017
4:12:43.6	Gwen McFarlan	Canada	04.04.1934	Ottawa	25.05.2014
4:31:42a	Helen Klein	United States	27.11.1922	Sacramento	08.12.2002
5:10:04	Ida Mintz	United States	15.10.1905	Chicago	20.10.1985
5:28:33	Ruth Rothfarb	United States	18.06.1901	Miami	16.01.1982
