= Jeannie Rice =

American runner (born 1948)

- Born: April 14, 1948 (age 77); South Korea
- Citizenship: United States
- Known for: Highest ever recorded VO_{2} max for a woman 75 or above

Jeannie Rice (born April 14, 1948) is an American runner, known for her short finish times at an advanced age. She holds multiple marathon world records in her age division. Her unusually robust physiology has drawn the attention of medical researchers, who found that she had the highest VO_{2} max for a woman 75 or above ever recorded.

== Early life ==
Rice was born on April 14, 1948, in South Korea. She immigrated to Mentor, Ohio when she was 18 or 19 to go to nursing school. She was a real estate agent by trade, and managed to sell 27 homes in her first year. She has since semi-retired.

== Running ==
Rice began running at age 35 to lose weight gained on a vacation back in her native South Korea. She was inspired to take up marathon running in particular by Joan Benoit's gold medal performance at the 1984 Olympics. She began with the Cleveland Marathon in 1983, running a 3:45.

In 2016, she estimated that she had run 1,000 races. She began setting world records in 2018, when she was 70 years old. This was around the time she began attracting attention in the running community. By 2019, she held the world records for the Akron Marathon and Akron Half Marathon for women 70+ years of age, posting 3:27:50 and 1:37:07. In 2023, she became a World Marathon Majors six-star finisher. She had completed 134 marathons by 2025, placing first multiple times in her age category of 70+. She has surpassed all male competitors of her age group in a marathon five times.

In a 2025 study published in the Journal of Applied Physiology, her VO_{2} max was recorded at 47.8, the highest ever recorded for a woman aged 75 or older, and her max heart rate at 180 beats per minute. For reference, such a VO_{2} max is average for a 25-year-old woman. The study also noted that with times of 3:24:48 and 3:33:27, Rice holds world records for the marathon in the W70 marathon world record progression 70-74 and W75 marathon world record progression 75-79 year women age group categories. Conversely, her running economy was found to be unremarkable.

As of 2025, she is the fastest woman (aged 75 to 79) worldwide in the 1500m, 5km or 10km.

== Personal life ==
Rice was married but divorced due to her husband's lack of support for her running. Rice is a mother of two sons. She has grandchildren. In addition to running, she skis. She is a snowbird, spending time in both Cleveland, Ohio and Naples, Florida. Throughout the course of her running career, she has suffered only one injury. She consistently runs 50 miles (80 km) per week.

Rice is a lifelong pescetarian and says "I eat a lot of rice."

She was present at the 2013 Boston Marathon, and was near the bombing.
