= Masters M50 marathon world record progression =

Masters M50 marathon world record progression is the progression of world record improvements of the marathon M50 division of Masters athletics. Records must be set in properly conducted, official competitions under the standing IAAF rules unless modified by World Masters Athletics. The M50 division consists of male athletes who have reached the age of 50 but have not yet reached the age of 55, so exactly from their 50th birthday to the day before their 55th birthday. Marathon running is not normally seeded into age divisions so all of these records were set in marathon race open to most other age groups.

Key

Incomplete information Pending

Time	Athlete	Nationality	Birthdate	Location	Date
2:15:24	Mark Kiptoo	Kenya	21 June 1976	Frankfurt	25 October 2026
2:19:29	Titus Mamabolo	South Africa	11 January 1941	Durban	20 July 1991
2:20:28	Jack Foster	New Zealand	23 May 1932	Auckland	30 May 1982
2:22:14	Piet van Alphen	Netherlands	16 August 1930	Eugene	7 September 1980
2:25:19	Erik Östbye	Sweden	25 January 1921	Cologne	1 September 1972
2:27:30	Erik Östbye	Sweden	25 January 1921	Malmö	14 May 1972
