= Masters W55 marathon world record progression =

Masters W55 marathon world record progression is the progression of world record improvements of the marathon W55 division of Masters athletics. Records must be set in properly conducted, official competitions under the standing IAAF rules unless modified by World Masters Athletics. The W55 division consists of female athletes who have reached the age of 55 but have not yet reached the age of 60, from their 55th birthday to the day before their 60th birthday. Age divisions are not normally seeded in Marathon running, so all of these records were set in a marathon open to most other age groups.

Key

Incomplete information Pending

Time	Athlete	Nationality	Birthdate	Age	Location	Date	Ref
2:45:51 (2:45:27c)	Jenny Hitchings	United States	1 July 1963	59 years, 296 days	London	23 April 2023	
2:48:15 (2:48:06c)	Krishna Stanton	Australia	18 May 1966	56 years, 137 days	London	2 October 2022	
2:50:40	Jenny Hitchings	United States	1 July 1963	56 years, 125 days	New York City	3 November 2019	
2:50:33 a	Joan Samuelson	United States	16 May 1957	55 years, 334 days	Boston	15 April 2013	
2:51:40 a	Christine Kennedy	Ireland	29 December 1954	55 years, 277 days	St. George	2 October 2010	
2:52:14	Rae Baymiller	United States	27 July 1943	55 years, 76 days	Chicago	11 October 1998	
2:57:55	Miyo Ishigami	Japan	9 May 1934	55 years, 194 days	Tokyo	19 November 1989	
3:07:21	Margaret Miller	United States	12 December 1925	56 years, 211 days	San Francisco	11 July 1982	
3:08:48	Helen Dick	United States	4 August 1924	56 years, 55 days	Chicago	28 September 1980	
