= Masters W75 marathon world record progression =

Masters W75 marathon world record progression is the progression of world record improvements of the marathon W75 division of Masters athletics. Records must be set in properly conducted, official competitions under the standing IAAF rules unless modified by World Masters Athletics. The W75 division consists of female athletes who have reached the age of 75 but have not yet reached the age of 80, so exactly from their 75th birthday to the day before their 80th birthday. Marathon running is not normally seeded into age divisions so all of these records were set in marathon races open to most other age groups.

Key

Incomplete information Pending

Time	Athlete	Nationality	Birthdate	Age	Location	Date	Ref
3:48:02	Jeannie Rice	United States	14 April 1948	60 years, 99 days	Chicago	8 October 2023	
3:53:42	Yoko Nakano	Japan	01.12.1935		Otawara	23.11.2012	
3:57:30	Gwen McFarlan	Canada	04.04.1934		Vancouver	03.05.2009	
4:08:31	Ginette Bedard	United States	12.08.1933		New York City	02.11.2008	
4:08:54	Betty Jean McHugh	Canada	07.11.1927		Victoria	12.10.2003	
4:21:40	Jose Edith Waller	United Kingdom	16.04.1922		Gosport	21.04.1997	
4:41:45a	Ida Mintz	United States	15.10.1905		Highland Park	26.04.1981	
4:49:08	Anne Clarke	United States	21.09.1909		Chicago	20.10.1985	
4:53:36	Mavis Lindgren	United States	02.04.1907		San Francisco	06.06.1982	
