= Gene Dykes =

American marathon runner

Gene Dykes (also known as UltraGeezer) is an American marathon runner and retired computer programmer. He has run over 184 marathons and ultramarathons since 2006. In 2021, he broke men's 70–74 50k road running wold record by 19 minutes at the USATF.
