= Masters W40 marathon world record progression =

Masters W40 marathon world record progression is the progression of world record improvements of the marathon W40 division of Masters athletics. Records must be set in properly conducted, official competitions under the standing IAAF rules unless modified by World Masters Athletics. The W40 division consists of female athletes who have reached the age of 40 but have not yet reached the age of 45, so exactly from their 40th birthday to the day before their 45th birthday. Marathon running is not normally seeded into age divisions so all of these records were set in marathon race open to most other age groups.

Key

Incomplete information Pending

Time	Athlete	Nationality	Birthdate	Age	Location	Date	Ref
2:19:52	Helalia Johannes	Namibia	13 August 1980	40 years, 115 days	Valencia	6 December 2020	
2:22:11	Lydia Cheromei	Kenya	11 May 1977	41 years, 205 days	Valencia	2 December 2018	
2:22:27	Mariya Konovalova	Russia	14 August 1974	40 years, 206 days	Nagoya	8 March 2015	
2:24:53.6	Irina Mikitenko	Germany	23 August 1972	41 years, 37 days	Berlin	29 September 2013	
2:25:43	Ludmila Petrova	Russia	7 October 1968	40 years, 27 days	New York City	3 November 2008	
2:26:51	Priscilla Welch	Great Britain	22 November 1944	42 years, 169 days	London	10 May 1987	
2:29:43	Joyce Smith	Great Britain	26 October 1937	44 years, 195 days	London	9 May 1982	
2:29:57	Joyce Smith	Great Britain	26 October 1937	43 years, 154 days	London	29 March 1981	
2:30:27	Joyce Smith	Great Britain	26 October 1937	43 years, 21 days	Tokyo	16 November 1980	
2:33:32	Joyce Smith	Great Britain	26 October 1937	42 years, 240 days	Sandbach	22 June 1980	
2:39:11	Miki Gorman	United States	9 August 1935	41 years, 76 days	New York City	24 October 1976	
