= Masters M55 marathon world record progression =

Masters M55 marathon world record progression is the progression of world record improvements of the marathon M55 division of Masters athletics. Records must be set in properly conducted, official competitions under the standing IAAF rules unless modified by World Masters Athletics. The M55 division consists of male athletes who have reached the age of 55 but have not yet reached the age of 60, so exactly from their 55th birthday to the day before their 60th birthday. Marathon running is not normally seeded into age divisions so all of these records were set in marathon race open to most other age groups.

Key

Incomplete information Pending

Time	Athlete	Nationality	Birthdate	Age	Location	Date	Ref
2:24:05	Aleksandr Rogoten	Russia	22 September 1969	55 years, 7 days	Berlin	29 September 2024	
2:19:32	Ayele Seteng	Israel	11 April 1955	55 years, 364 days	Rotterdam	10 April 2011	
2:25:56	Piet Van Alphen	Netherlands	16 August 1930	55 years, 246 days	Rotterdam	19 April 1986	
2:26:35	Erik Östbye	Sweden	25 January 1921	55 years, 238 days	Gothenburg	19 September 1976	
2:29:32	Erik Östbye	Sweden	25 January 1921	55 years, 49 days	Vällingby	14 March 1976	
2:40:44	Francis McGrath	Australia	1 December 1919	55 years, 259 days	Toronto	17 August 1975	
