= Masters W50 marathon world record progression =

Masters W50 marathon world record progression is the progression of world record improvements of the marathon W50 division of Masters athletics. Records must be set in properly conducted, official competitions under the standing IAAF rules unless modified by World Masters Athletics. The W50 division consists of female athletes who have reached the age of 50 but have not yet reached the age of 55, so exactly from their 50th birthday to the day before their 55th birthday. Marathon running is not normally seeded into age divisions so all of these records were set in marathon race open to most other age groups.

Key

Incomplete information Pending

Time	Athlete	Nationality	Birthdate	Location	Date
2:31:05	Tatyana Pozdniakova	Ukraine	04.03.1955	Los Angeles	06.03.2005
2:44:12	Beverly "Bev" Lucas	Australia	13.10.1946	Brisbane	13.07.1997
2:47:26	Beverly "Bev" Lucas	Australia	13.10.1946	Taipei	24.11.1996
2:48:47	Edeltraud Pohl	Germany	14.07.1936	Frankfurt	30.10.1988
2:51:01a	Marion Irvine	United States	19.10.1929	Sacramento	04.12.1983
2:51:46	Denise Alfvoet	Belgium	13.10.1935	Maassluis	12.04.1986
2:52:27	Valborg Østberg	Norway	14.05.1931	Oslo	03.07.1982
2:57:24	Toshiko D'Elia	United States	02.01.1930	Glasgow	24.08.1980
