= Masters W60 marathon world record progression =

Masters W60 marathon world record progression is the progression of world record improvements of the marathon W60 division of Masters athletics. Records must be set in properly conducted, official competitions under the standing IAAF rules unless modified by World Masters Athletics. The W60 division consists of female athletes who have reached the age of 60 but have not yet reached the age of 65, so exactly from their 60th birthday to the day before their 65th birthday. Marathon running is not normally seeded into age divisions so all of these records were set in marathon race open to most other age groups.

Key

Incomplete information Pending

Time	Athlete	Nationality	Birthdate	Age	Location	Date	Ref
2:49:43	Jenny Hitchings	United States	1 July 1963	60 years, 99 days	Chicago	8 October 2023	
2:52:01	Mariko Yugeta	Japan	13 May 1958		Tokyo	10 April 2021	
2:52:13	Mariko Yugeta	Japan	13 May 1958		Osaka	31 January 2021	
2:56:54	Mariko Yugeta	Japan	13 May 1958		Saitama	8 December 2019	
3:01:30	Bernardine Portenski	New Zealand	26 August 1949		Gold Coast	4 July 2010	
3:02:50	Claudine Marchadier	France	30 August 1947		La Rochelle	25 November 2007	
3:07:48	Emmi Lüthi	Switzerland	1 March 1944		Luzern	27 October 2007	
3:11:57a	Barbara Miller	United States	7 August 1939		Boston	17 April 2000	
3:14:50	Barbara Miller	United States	7 August 1939		Huntsville	11 December 1999	
3:14:56	Christa Wulf	Germany	11 December 1933		Berlin	28 September 1997	
3:15:30	Helen Dick	United States	4 August 1924		Chicago	21 October 1984	
3:19:36	Liselotte Schulz	Germany	7 May 1920		Bremen	24 April 1983	
3:21:47	Liselotte Schulz	Germany	7 May 1920		Glasgow	24 August 1980	
3:25:40	Marcie Trent	United States	22 December 1917		Boise	11 November 1979	
3:26:16	Marcie Trent	United States	22 December 1917		Weott	7 May 1978	
