= Kenneth Mburu Mungara =

Kenyan long-distance runner

Kenneth Mburu Mungara, also known as Kennedy Mburu, (born 7 September 1973 in Limuru) is a Kenyan long-distance runner who specialises in the marathon. He holds the Master's 40–44 age group world record in the marathon.

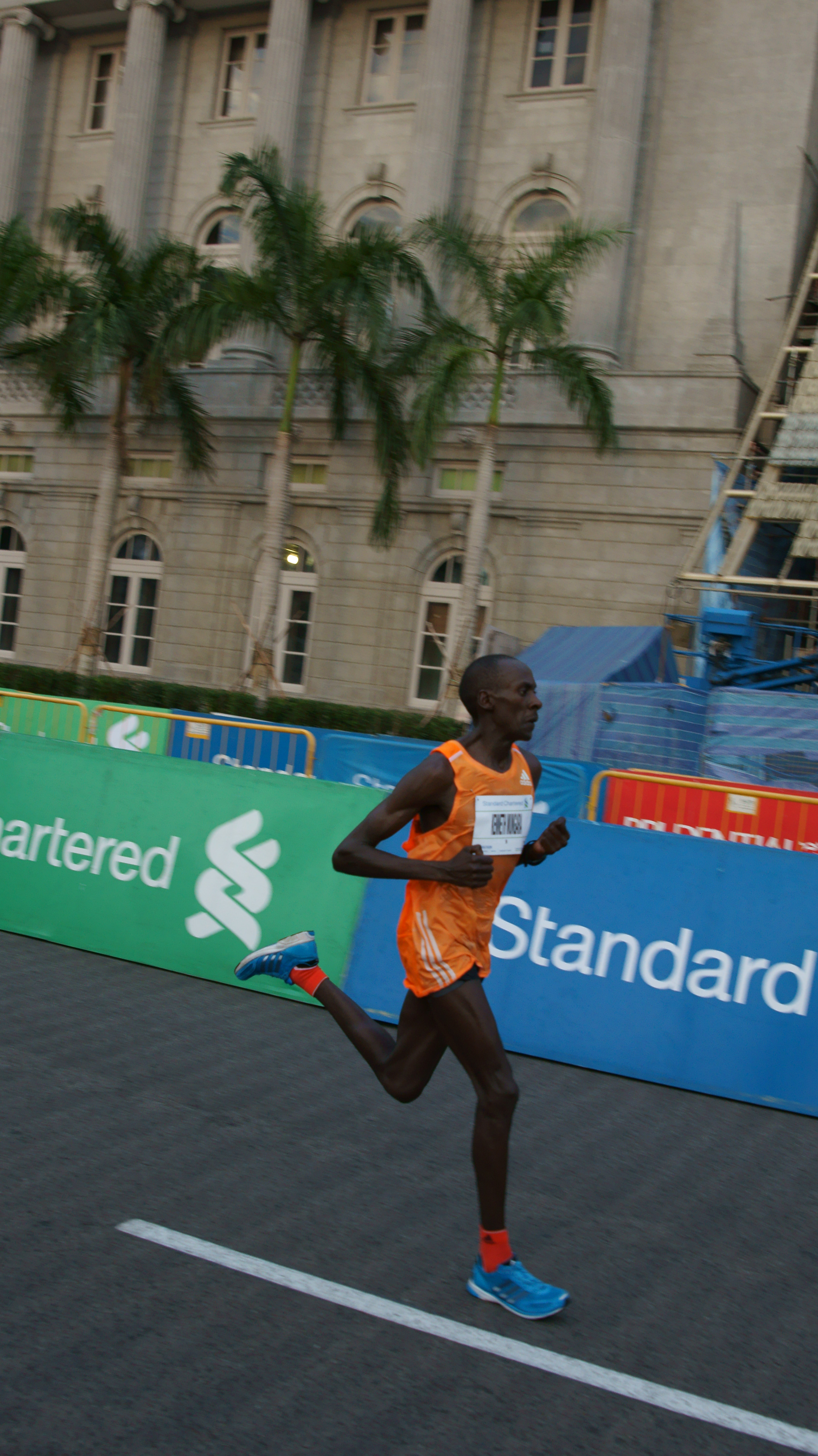
SCM1 Singapore 2014

He won his first major international marathon in 2008, completing the Prague Marathon in 2:11:06, one minute ahead of second-placed Eliah Sang. Four months later he won the Scotiabank Toronto Waterfront Marathon, upsetting the race favourites John Kelai and Tariku Jufar, and edging out Peter Kiprotich for the victory in 2:11:01.

In January the following year, he won the Mumbai Marathon and his time of 2:11:51 was the fastest ever on Indian soil, beating Shivnath Singh's record which had stood since 1978. He managed a third-place finish at the 2009 Prague Marathon, but he was hampered by a knee injury. He recovered in time for the 2009 Toronto Waterfront Marathon and defended his title, finishing in a time of 2:08:31 and breaking the Canadian all-comers' record. He was pleased with, but surprised by, the achievement, stating that he did not believe his manager when he said Mungara could run 2:08. He received a total of 55,000 Canadian dollars in winner's prize money and performance bonuses.

He returned to the Prague Marathon in 2010 but could not repeat his past performances and finished in 2:10:53 for seventh place. He maintained his reputation at the Scotiabank Toronto Waterfront Marathon, however, improving his Canadian all-comers record to 2:07:57 for his third consecutive win of the event. When asked whether he was considering one of the large American marathons the following year, Mungara admitted he had already promised to return to Toronto for a fourth attempt. He won at the Singapore Marathon in December, taking the first prize of US$50,000. He achieved a fourth straight win at the 2011 Toronto Marathon, although the finish was close between Mungara and Abdullah Dawit as both recorded the same finishing time of 2:09:51 hours. At the 2011 Prague Marathon he was runner-up to Benson Barus but still managed a personal best run of 2:07:36 hours.

He did not perform well in the 2012 season, running 2:15:59 at the Paris Marathon and then 2:16:53 at the JoongAng Seoul Marathon, finishing far behind the winner on both occasions. He was ever slower (2:17:40) at the Singapore Marathon, but was fourth and only twenty seconds behind the leader at that race. Almost a year passed until his next outing, where he returned to form with a winning run of 2:11:40 hours at the Nairobi Marathon.

In July 2015 he raced at the Gold Coast Marathon in Australia for the first time, which is an IAAF Gold Label Race. He placed first finishing in 2:08:42 beating the defending champion Silah Limo by only 12 seconds, which remains the course and Australian All-Comers record. In 2016, Kenneth successfully defended his title by edging out Japanese running legend, Yuki Kawauchi, by a mere one second in one of the closest and thrilling finishes in marathon history. He returned for a third year in 2017 placing second, only to be beaten one hundred meters from the finish line by Japanese runner Takuya Noguchi in another thrilling finish on the Gold Coast. Kenneth returned to the Gold Coast Marathon for the fourth consecutive year in 2018, which he became champion for the third time in yet again one of the closest races in the events history, with only three seconds separating the top three places in the race.

In 2018 Kenneth was selected on the national team to represent Kenya in the marathon at the XXI Commonwealth Games on the Gold Coast in Australia. The marathon event took place on 15 April 2018 at 8:15 am (AEST), which was the final day of the Games. He placed tenth in a time of 2:25:42.

== Achievements ==
- All results regarding marathon, unless stated otherwise

Year	Competition	Venue	Position	Notes
Representing Kenya
2007	Cologne Marathon	Cologne, Germany	4th	2:11:36
2007	Mombasa Marathon	Mombasa, Kenya	2nd	2:10:13
2008	Tiberias Marathon	Tiberias, Israel	2nd	2:10:37
2008	Prague Marathon	Prague, Czech Republic	1st	2:11:06
2008	Toronto Waterfront Marathon	Toronto, Canada	1st	2:11:01
2009	Mumbai Marathon	Mumbai, India	1st	2:11:51
2009	Prague Marathon	Prague, Czech Republic	3rd	2:10:29
2009	Toronto Waterfront Marathon	Toronto, Canada	1st	2:08:32
2010	Beppu-Oita Mainichi Marathon	Beppu, Japan	5th	2:11:05
2010	Toronto Waterfront Marathon	Toronto, Canada	1st	2:07:57
2010	Singapore Marathon	Singapore, Republic of Singapore	1st	2:14:06
2011	Toronto Waterfront Marathon	Toronto, Canada	1st	2:09:49
2011	Prague Marathon	Prague, Czech Republic	2nd	2:07:36
2013	Nairobi Marathon	Nairobi, Kenya	1st	2:11:40
2015	Milano City Marathon	Milan, Italy	1st	2:08:44
2015	Gold Coast Marathon	Gold Coast, Australia	1st	2:08:42 (CR)
2016	Gold Coast Marathon	Gold Coast, Australia	1st	2:09:00
2017	Gold Coast Marathon	Gold Coast, Australia	2nd	2:09:04
2018	XXI Commonwealth Games	Gold Coast, Australia	10th	2:25:42
2018	Gold Coast Marathon	Gold Coast, Australia	1st	2:09:47

== Personal bests ==
Event	Time (h:m:s)	Venue	Date
Marathon	2:07:36	Prague, Czech Republic	8 May 2011

- All information taken from IAAF profile.
