= Ed Whitlock =

Canadian long-distance runner (1931–2017)

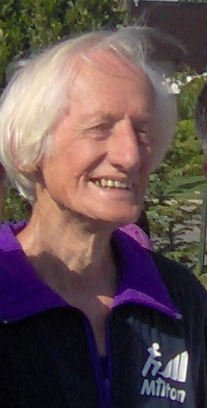
- At the Milton Half-Marathon 2012

Personal information
- Nationality: British & Canadian
- Born: Edward Whitlock; March 6, 1931 London, England
- Died: March 13, 2017 (aged 86) Toronto, Ontario, Canada
- Occupations: Engineer, Runner
- Years active: 1948–2017
- Height: 5 ft 7 in (170 cm)
- Weight: 112 lb (51 kg)
- Spouse: Brenda

Sport
- Sport: Track and Field
- Events: 800 m, 1500 m, 3000 m, 5000 m, 10,000 m, Half marathon, Marathon
- University team: University of London
- Club: Ranelagh Harriers

Ed Whitlock (March 6, 1931 – March 13, 2017) was an English-born Canadian long-distance runner, and the first person over 70 years old to run a marathon in less than three hours, with a time of 2:59:10 in 2003.

Whitlock, who ran as a teenager and took up the sport again in his forties, first became the oldest person to run a marathon in less than three hours in 2000, at the age of 69, with a time of 2:52:47. He later extended this record, running a time of 2:58:40 at the age of 74. At 73, he set a world record in the marathon for men 70 to 74, running a 2:54:48, his fastest time after turning 70. According to an article in The New York Times, if age-graded, this time would be equivalent to a 20-year-old running 2:03:57 and would have been the fastest marathon ever run in 2010. For an explanation of age-graded tables, see masters athletics. At the time of his death, Whitlock was known to be the only person over 70 to run a marathon in less than three hours, although Gene Dykes has subsequently done so several times, as has Jo Schoonbroodt.

Aged 85, in October 2016, Whitlock became the oldest person to run a marathon in less than four hours — 3:56:34 at the Toronto Waterfront Marathon.

== Early life ==
Whitlock was born in a suburb of London, England. Later, he emigrated to Canada to pursue an engineering career following graduation from Royal School of Mines, Imperial College, England. He later resided in Milton, Ontario.

While at school and university in England, he was a serious junior runner, primarily at cross country but also at track and road relays. He was the winner of the Ranelagh Harriers and South London Harriers inter schools cross country races in consecutive years, 1948 and 1949. He was the University of London champion at cross country and 3 miles on the track. He stopped running after arriving in Canada.

== Return to running ==
Whitlock did not start running again until he was 41. He focused on racing middle-distance. After several years, he recorded best times of 1:59.9 for 800 metres and 4:02.5 for 1500 metres.

He started running marathons accidentally when his youngest son who was into running at the time in school determined he was going to run a marathon after running every day for over a year without a break. His son was only 14 at the time. Whitlock tried to deter him, but in the end reluctantly ran the race with him. Although not concentrating on the marathon, he ran 2:31:23 at age 48.

In his sixties after retiring he started to concentrate on road racing and latterly the objective of becoming the first man over 70 to run a marathon in less than three hours. After an initial attempt at age 70, injury prevented another attempt until age 72 when in 2003 he completed the marathon 2:59:10. In the following year, he lowered the record to 2:54:49 and in 2005 ran 2:58:40 at age 74, making him the oldest man to run under three hours for a marathon.

In 2006 he set the world record for the 75 to 79 age group with a time of 3:08:35 at the Toronto Waterfront Marathon, and in the Rotterdam Marathon on April 15, 2007, Whitlock lowered that mark to 3:04:54 on a day when the marathon was stopped after three and a half hours because of high temperature.

On September 26, 2010, Whitlock ran the Toronto Waterfront Half Marathon in 1:34:23.4.

After turning 80, Whitlock improved the marathon world record for his age category by almost 15 minutes to 3:25:43 at the 2011 Rotterdam Marathon on April 10, 2011. He then further improved on his age category world record at the Toronto Waterfront Marathon on October 16, 2011, lowering the record to 3:15:54.

At age 81, on Sunday, September 16, 2012, wearing bib number 1, Whitlock broke the Canadian and unofficial world half-marathon record at his hometown inaugural race, the Milton Half-Marathon, running 1:38:59. In 2013, he lowered the record to 1:38:11 on the same course.

Whitlock also competed on the track, where as of 2012 he held 15 world age group records ranging in distance from 1500 metres to 10,000 m and age groups 65+, 70+, 75+, 80+ and 85+, as well as the three age group marathon records 70+, 75+ and 80+.

On October 16, 2016, Whitlock, aged 85, ran the Toronto Marathon in 3:56:38, setting a new world record.

== Awards ==
In 2016, Whitlock was inducted into the Milton Sports Hall of Fame as nominee in the inaugural induction class.

The Town of Milton named a street after Whitlock, which intersects with Highway 25.

== Death ==
On March 13, 2017, Whitlock died of prostate cancer in Toronto, one week after his 86th birthday.

== Age group records ==
Whitlock held 36 world age class records on the road and track.

Outdoor – track

Age group world record times
| Distance | Men 65–69 | Men 70–74 | Men 75–79 | Men 80–84 | Men 85–89 |
|---|---|---|---|---|---|
| 1500 m | | | | 5:48.93 | 6:38.23 |
| Mile | | | 5:41.80 | | 7:18.55(†); 7:22(†) |
| 3000 m | | | 11:10.43 | 12:13.56 | |
| 5000 m | | 18:33.38* | 19:07.02 | 20:58.12 | 24:03.99 |
| 10000 m | | 38:04.13 | 39:25.16 | 42:39.95 | 51:07.53 |

† 2016 times not (yet?) ratified as world records
* record subsequently beaten by Ron Robertson NZ

Indoor – track

Age group world record times
| Distance | Men 65–69 | Men 70–74 | Men 75–79 | Men 80–84 | Men 85–89 |
|---|---|---|---|---|---|
| 1500 m | | 5:12.22* | 5:20.04 | 5:48.47 | 6:38.87 |
| 3000 m | 10:11.6* | 10:52.40 | 11:17.21 | 12:00.88 | 13:41.96 |

* Records subsequently beaten by others
Outdoor – road

Age group world record times
| Distance | Men 70–74 | Men 75–79 | Men 80–84 | Men 85–89 |
|---|---|---|---|---|
| Marathon | 2:54:48 | 3:04:54 | 3:15:54 | 3:56:38(†) |

=== Road records by age group ===
In addition to the records above recognised by World Masters Athletics, the Association of Road Race Statisticians keeps single and group age road records. Whitlock's age group records recognized by ARRS follow.

Road world records

Best times by age group
| Distance | Men 60–64 | Men 65–69 | Men 70–74 | Men 75–79 | Men 80–84 | Men 85-89 |
|---|---|---|---|---|---|---|
| 5K | | 17:23 | 18:21.2 | 18:45 | | |
| 8K | | 28:36 | 30:44 | | | |
| 10K | | | 37:33 | 40:10 | 42:58 | |
| 15K | | 55:04 | 58:19 | 1:00:19 | 1:07:05 | 1:15:10 |
| 10 Mile | | 1:00:11 | 1:02:19 | | | |
| Half Marathon | | | 1:22:23 | 1:29:26 | 1:38:59 | 1:50:47 |
| 30k | 1:57:07 | 1:57:40 | 2:00:56 | | | |
| Marathon | | | 2:54:48 | 3:04:54 | 3:15:54 | 3:56:38 |

== See also ==
- List of world records in masters athletics
