= 2018 World Masters Athletics Championships Men =

The twenty-third World Masters Athletics Championships were held in Málaga, Spain, from September 4–September 16, 2018. This was the second even year of the biennial championship as beginning in 2016 in Perth, Australia, the championships moved to be held in even numbered years. The World Masters Athletics Championships serve the division of the sport of athletics for people over 35 years of age, referred to as Masters athletics.

A full range of track and field events were held, along with a cross country race and a marathon.

== Results ==
=== 100 metres ===
All finals held on September 6, 2018

==== M35 100 metres ====
Wind: -0.2

Pos	Athlete	Birthdate	Country	Result
1st place, gold medalist(s)	Rondrick Parker	28-Mar-1983	United States	10.85
2nd place, silver medalist(s)	Jonathan Browne	15-Mar-1983	Great Britain	10.87
3rd place, bronze medalist(s)	Terrence Roland	17-Feb-1982	United States	10.90

==== M40 100 metres ====
Wind: -1.0

Pos	Athlete	Birthdate	Country	Result
1st place, gold medalist(s)	Dominic Bradley	22-Dec-1976	Great Britain	11.08
2nd place, silver medalist(s)	Jochen Gippert	25-Jan-1977	Germany	11.18
3rd place, bronze medalist(s)	Lion Martinez	26-Jan-1978	Sweden	11.18

==== M45 100 metres ====
Wind: +0.3

Pos	Athlete	Birthdate	Country	Result
1st place, gold medalist(s)	Jason Carty	10-Nov-1969	Great Britain	11.01
2nd place, silver medalist(s)	Hiroaki Akabori	21-Jun-1972	Japan	11.33
3rd place, bronze medalist(s)	Takeshi Fukuzato	12-Jan-1971	Japan	11.35

==== M50 100 metres ====
Wind: -0.7

Pos	Athlete	Birthdate	Country	Result
1st place, gold medalist(s)	Yoshihisa Miyamoto	19-Feb-1968	Japan	11.51
2nd place, silver medalist(s)	Karnell Vickers	21-Feb-1967	United States	11.57
3rd place, bronze medalist(s)	Christopher Warburton	08-Aug-1965	Canada	11.67

==== M55 100 metres ====
Wind: -0.5

Pos	Athlete	Birthdate	Country	Result
1st place, gold medalist(s)	Giulio Morelli	06-Mar-1963	Italy	12.09
2nd place, silver medalist(s)	Don McGee	21-May-1960	United States	12.11
3rd place, bronze medalist(s)	Reiner Heweling	..-..-1963	Germany	12.16

==== M60 100 metres ====
Video on YouTube

Wind: -0.4

Pos	Athlete	Birthdate	Country	Result
1st place, gold medalist(s)	Val Barnwell	10-Sep-1957	United States	12.08
2nd place, silver medalist(s)	Gerhard Zorn	12-Aug-1956	Germany	12.48
3rd place, bronze medalist(s)	Rudolf Konig	29-Dec-1953	Germany	12.74

==== M65 100 metres ====
Wind: -3.4

Pos	Athlete	Birthdate	Country	Result
1st place, gold medalist(s)	Stephen Peters	05-Jul-1953	Great Britain	12.56
2nd place, silver medalist(s)	Michael Kish	09-Feb-1951	United States	12.91
3rd place, bronze medalist(s)	David Craig	..-..-1952	United States	13.16

==== M70 100 metres ====
Wind: -3.3

Pos	Athlete	Birthdate	Country	Result
1st place, gold medalist(s)	Charles Allie	20-Aug-1947	United States	13.22
2nd place, silver medalist(s)	Vladimir Vybostok	19-Feb-1947	Slovakia	13.85
3rd place, bronze medalist(s)	Masahiko Yamazaki	18-Aug-1947	Japan	14.21

==== M75 100 metres ====
Wind: -2.6

Pos	Athlete	Birthdate	Country	Result
1st place, gold medalist(s)	Hartmut Kraemer	19-Mar-1942	Germany	14.43
2nd place, silver medalist(s)	Fritz Reichle	24-May-1942	Germany	14.75
3rd place, bronze medalist(s)	Jaime Alfredo Leon Pallete		Peru	15.02

==== M80 100 metres ====
Wind: -2.8

Pos	Athlete	Birthdate	Country	Result
1st place, gold medalist(s)	Robert Lida	11-Nov-1936	United States	14.98
2nd place, silver medalist(s)	Oswald Rogers	28-Sep-1937	Trinidad and Tobago	15.86
3rd place, bronze medalist(s)	Francisco Morrongiello	31-Jan-1938	Argentina	16.03

==== M85 100 metres ====
Wind: -3.4

Pos	Athlete	Birthdate	Country	Result
1st place, gold medalist(s)	Hiroo Tanaka	08-Dec-1930	Japan	16.68
2nd place, silver medalist(s)	Henri Lenoir	09-Jun-1932	Belgium	16.84
3rd place, bronze medalist(s)	Robert Moumetou	02-May-1933	France	18.27

==== M90 100 metres ====
Wind: -3.5

Pos	Athlete	Birthdate	Country	Result
1st place, gold medalist(s)	Yoshiyuki Shimizu	14-Jul-1928	Brazil	18.46
2nd place, silver medalist(s)	Dalbir Singh Deol	01-Jul-1926	Great Britain	25.29
3rd place, bronze medalist(s)	Radovan Leovic	29-Aug-1927	Australia	26.98

=== 200 metres ===
All finals held on September 9, 2018

==== M35 200 metres ====
Wind: -1.3

Pos	Athlete	Birthdate	Country	Result
1st place, gold medalist(s)	Jonathan Browne	15-Mar-1983	Great Britain	21.93
2nd place, silver medalist(s)	Rondrick Parker	28-Mar-1983	United States	22.19
3rd place, bronze medalist(s)	Sean Burnett	19-Oct-1981	United States	22.46

==== M40 200 metres ====
Wind: -2.1

Pos	Athlete	Birthdate	Country	Result
1st place, gold medalist(s)	Dominic Bradley	22-Dec-1976	Great Britain	22.72
2nd place, silver medalist(s)	Lion Martinez	26-Jan-1978	Sweden	22.78
3rd place, bronze medalist(s)	Gavin Stephens	12-Sep-1977	Great Britain	22.81

==== M45 200 metres ====
Wind: -1.2

Pos	Athlete	Birthdate	Country	Result
1st place, gold medalist(s)	Jason Carty	10-Nov-1969	Great Britain	22.91
2nd place, silver medalist(s)	Michael Coogan	06-Jul-1972	Great Britain	23.08
3rd place, bronze medalist(s)	Gregorio Martínez	06-May-1973	Spain	23.36

==== M50 200 metres ====
Wind: -0.7

Pos	Athlete	Birthdate	Country	Result
1st place, gold medalist(s)	Lee Bridges	20-Mar-1967	United States	23.69
2nd place, silver medalist(s)	Christopher Warburton	08-Aug-1965	Canada	23.79
3rd place, bronze medalist(s)	Yoshihisa Miyamoto	19-Feb-1968	Japan	23.95

==== M55 200 metres ====
Wind: -0.5

Pos	Athlete	Birthdate	Country	Result
1st place, gold medalist(s)	Giulio Morelli	06-Mar-1963	Italy	24.58
2nd place, silver medalist(s)	Don McGee	21-May-1960	United States	24.70
3rd place, bronze medalist(s)	Patrice Carnier	17-Mar-1962	France	25.16

==== M60 200 metres ====
Wind: -1.2

Pos	Athlete	Birthdate	Country	Result
1st place, gold medalist(s)	Gerhard Zorn	12-Aug-1956	Germany	25.49
2nd place, silver medalist(s)	Val Barnwell	10-Sep-1957	United States	25.58
3rd place, bronze medalist(s)	Trevor Young	..-Apr-1958	Australia	25.98

==== M65 200 metres ====
Wind: +0.3

Pos	Athlete	Birthdate	Country	Result
1st place, gold medalist(s)	Stephen Peters	05-Jul-1953	Great Britain	24.84
2nd place, silver medalist(s)	David Craig	..-..-1952	United States	26.28
3rd place, bronze medalist(s)	Michael Kish	09-Feb-1951	United States	27.01

==== M70 200 metres ====
Wind: -1.2

Pos	Athlete	Birthdate	Country	Result
1st place, gold medalist(s)	Charles Allie	20-Aug-1947	United States	26.06
2nd place, silver medalist(s)	Roberto Paesani	09-Aug-1946	Italy	28.62
3rd place, bronze medalist(s)	José Luis Romero	11-Feb-1946	Spain	28.96

==== M75 200 metres ====
Wind: -0.9

Pos	Athlete	Birthdate	Country	Result
1st place, gold medalist(s)	Yuan-Chung Hsu	10-Jan-1942	Chinese Taipei	29.49
2nd place, silver medalist(s)	Hartmut Kraemer	19-Mar-1942	Germany	30.24
3rd place, bronze medalist(s)	Alan Forse	01-Sep-1943	Great Britain	30.78

==== M80 200 metres ====
Wind: -1.5

Pos	Athlete	Birthdate	Country	Result
1st place, gold medalist(s)	Robert Lida	11-Nov-1936	United States	30.69
2nd place, silver medalist(s)	Oswald Rogers	28-Sep-1937	Trinidad and Tobago	32.93
3rd place, bronze medalist(s)	Francisco Morrongiello	31-Jan-1938	Argentina	33.50

==== M85 200 metres ====
Wind: +0.1

Pos	Athlete	Birthdate	Country	Result
1st place, gold medalist(s)	Hiroo Tanaka	08-Dec-1930	Japan	16.68
2nd place, silver medalist(s)	Henri Lenoir	09-Jun-1932	Belgium	36.88
3rd place, bronze medalist(s)	Herbert E. Muller	12-Nov-1929	Germany	39.52

==== M90 200 metres ====
Wind: -1.4

Pos	Athlete	Birthdate	Country	Result
1st place, gold medalist(s)	Yoshiyuki Shimizu	14-Jul-1928	Brazil	37.16 WR
2nd place, silver medalist(s)	Manuel Hernando Díaz Carrillo	..-..-1928	Colombia	48.36
3rd place, bronze medalist(s)	Dalbir Singh Deol	01-Jul-1926	Great Britain	51.63

=== 400 metres ===
All finals held on September 14, 2018

==== M35 400 metres ====
Pos	Athlete	Birthdate	Country	Result
1st place, gold medalist(s)	Stewart Marshall	02-Dec-1980	Great Britain	49.37
2nd place, silver medalist(s)	Richard Beardsell	19-Jan-1979	Great Britain	49.48
3rd place, bronze medalist(s)	Mustapha Marzouq	21-Feb-1981	France	49.71

==== M40 400 metres ====
Pos	Athlete	Birthdate	Country	Result
1st place, gold medalist(s)	Gavin Stephens	12-Sep-1977	Great Britain	49.68
2nd place, silver medalist(s)	Ricardo Menéndez González	26-Aug-1978	Spain	49.76
3rd place, bronze medalist(s)	Mark Mutai	23-Mar-1978	Kenya	50.07

==== M45 400 metres ====
Pos	Athlete	Birthdate	Country	Result
1st place, gold medalist(s)	Spencer Moraope	14-Jul-1972	South Africa	51.07
2nd place, silver medalist(s)	Juan Luis López Anaya	14-May-1970	Spain	51.34
3rd place, bronze medalist(s)	Andrew Wilcox	13-Feb-1969	Australia	52.15

==== M50 400 metres ====
Pos	Athlete	Birthdate	Country	Result
1st place, gold medalist(s)	Lee Bridges	20-Mar-1967	United States	52.72
2nd place, silver medalist(s)	Michael Gardiner	22-Jul-1968	Great Britain	52.79
3rd place, bronze medalist(s)	Paul Hughes	..-..-1968	Australia	53.42

==== M55 400 metres ====
Pos	Athlete	Birthdate	Country	Result
1st place, gold medalist(s)	Jonathan Tilt	05-Aug-1962	Great Britain	54.71
2nd place, silver medalist(s)	John Wright	15-Jun-1959	Great Britain	55.95
3rd place, bronze medalist(s)	Simon Bickers	..-..-1962	Great Britain	55.97

==== M60 400 metres ====
Pos	Athlete	Birthdate	Country	Result
1st place, gold medalist(s)	Gerhard Zorn	12-Aug-1956	Germany	55.88
2nd place, silver medalist(s)	Trevor Young	..-Apr-1958	Australia	56.54
3rd place, bronze medalist(s)	Angelo Mauri	08-Oct-1957	Italy	58.59

==== M65 400 metres ====
Pos	Athlete	Birthdate	Country	Result
1st place, gold medalist(s)	Stephen Peters	5 July 1953	Great Britain	59.09
2nd place, silver medalist(s)	Karl Dorschner	08-Oct-1951	Germany	1:00.51
3rd place, bronze medalist(s)	Vincenzo Felicetti	18-Feb-1949	Italy	1:01.07

==== M70 400 metres ====
Pos	Athlete	Birthdate	Country	Result
1st place, gold medalist(s)	Charles Allie	20-Aug-1947	United States	58.67
2nd place, silver medalist(s)	Roberto Paesani	09-Aug-1946	Italy	1:03.86
3rd place, bronze medalist(s)	José Luis Romero	11-Feb-1946	Spain	1:05.34

==== M75 400 metres ====
Pos	Athlete	Birthdate	Country	Result
1st place, gold medalist(s)	Yuan-Chung Hsu	10-Jan-1942	Chinese Taipei	1:08.29
2nd place, silver medalist(s)	Winston Laing	10-Oct-1942	Great Britain	1:10.09
3rd place, bronze medalist(s)	Alan Forse	01-Sep-1943	Great Britain	1:10.36

==== M80 400 metres ====
Pos	Athlete	Birthdate	Country	Result
1st place, gold medalist(s)	Mack Stewart	19-Sep-1937	United States	1:21.76
2nd place, silver medalist(s)	Dave Dunn	29-Apr-1936	Canada	1:24.06
3rd place, bronze medalist(s)	Jakobus Van Zyl	21-Jun-1937	South Africa	1:24.37

==== M85 400 metres ====
Pos	Athlete	Birthdate	Country	Result
1st place, gold medalist(s)	Hiroo Tanaka	08-Dec-1930	Japan	1:22.16
2nd place, silver medalist(s)	David Carr	15-Jun-1932	Australia	1:26.69
3rd place, bronze medalist(s)	Earl Fee	22-Mar-1929	Canada	1:30.22

==== M90 400 metres ====
Pos	Athlete	Birthdate	Country	Result
1st place, gold medalist(s)	Yoshiyuki Shimizu	14-Jul-1928	Brazil	1:29.35 WR
2nd place, silver medalist(s)	Luis H. Torres Rosa	29-Nov-1927	Puerto Rico	1:51.95

=== 800 metres ===
All finals held September 11, 2018

==== M35 800 metres ====
Video on YouTube

Pos	Athlete	Birthdate	Country	Result
1st place, gold medalist(s)	Juan Ramón Pous Pérez	17-Oct-1979	Spain	1:59.52
2nd place, silver medalist(s)	Pablo Munoz Caballero	23-Oct-1981	Spain	1:59.78
3rd place, bronze medalist(s)	Aaron Brown	06-Feb-1981	Great Britain	1:59.90

==== M40 800 metres ====
Video on YouTube

Pos	Athlete	Birthdate	Country	Result
1st place, gold medalist(s)	Octavio Perez Calatayud	06-Feb-1978	Spain	1:55.61
2nd place, silver medalist(s)	Charlie Thurstan	11-Feb-1975	Great Britain	1:55.66
3rd place, bronze medalist(s)	Bruno Anicet	04-Mar-1976	France	1:55.82

==== M45 800 metres ====
Video on YouTube

Pos	Athlete	Birthdate	Country	Result
1st place, gold medalist(s)	Spencer Moraope	14-Jul-1972	South Africa	1:59.99
2nd place, silver medalist(s)	Mark Williams	31-Oct-1972	United States	2:01.26
3rd place, bronze medalist(s)	Paulo Cesar Paiutto	08-Jan-1973	Brazil	2:02.08

==== M50 800 metres ====
Video on YouTube

Pos	Athlete	Birthdate	Country	Result
1st place, gold medalist(s)	Charles Novak	04-Sep-1967	United States	2:03.42
2nd place, silver medalist(s)	Adrian Haines	21-Apr-1967	Great Britain	2:03.54
3rd place, bronze medalist(s)	Margus Kirt	28-Jun-1967	Estonia	2:03.63

==== M55 800 metres ====
Video on YouTube

Pos	Athlete	Birthdate	Country	Result
1st place, gold medalist(s)	Ray Knerr	11-Apr-1960	United States	2:09.90
2nd place, silver medalist(s)	Simon Bickers	..-..-1962	Great Britain	2:09.95
3rd place, bronze medalist(s)	Giuseppe Ugolini	25-Sep-1961	Italy	2:10.00

==== M60 800 metres ====
Video on YouTube

Pos	Athlete	Birthdate	Country	Result
1st place, gold medalist(s)	Pierre-Jean Marique	16-Jan-1957	France	2:14.98
2nd place, silver medalist(s)	Ian Calder	07-Sep-1957	New Zealand	2:15.51
3rd place, bronze medalist(s)	Alfredo Bonetti	07-Apr-1958	Italy	2:15.77

==== M65 800 metres ====
Video on YouTube

Pos	Athlete	Birthdate	Country	Result
1st place, gold medalist(s)	Joe Gough	10-Jan-1953	Ireland	2:16.38
2nd place, silver medalist(s)	Michael Barrand	27-Apr-1952	Australia	2:19.96
3rd place, bronze medalist(s)	Carlos Humberto Loaiza Londono	04-May-1951	Colombia	2:21.30

==== M70 800 metres ====
Pos	Athlete	Birthdate	Country	Result
1st place, gold medalist(s)	Hans Smeets	23-Feb-1957	Netherlands	2:30.11
2nd place, silver medalist(s)	Kevin Solomon	21-Apr-1947	Australia	2:30.45
3rd place, bronze medalist(s)	Carlos Alberto Ricardo Zavala Runciman	03-Apr-1948	Peru	2:31.93

==== M75 800 metres ====
Pos	Athlete	Birthdate	Country	Result
1st place, gold medalist(s)	Sten Alvar Johannes Haglund	20-Jul-1943	Finland	2:48.86
2nd place, silver medalist(s)	Jean-Louis Esnault	19-Jan-1940	France	2:50.80
3rd place, bronze medalist(s)	Tormod Boenes	09-Apr-1942	Norway	2:51.66

==== M80 800 metres ====
Pos	Athlete	Birthdate	Country	Result
1st place, gold medalist(s)	Manuel Alonso Domingo	21-Mar-1936	Spain	2:59.88
2nd place, silver medalist(s)	Angel Cano Alcolea	06-Jan-1938	Spain	3:04.78
3rd place, bronze medalist(s)	Klemens Wittig	11-Aug-1937	Germany	3:12.82

==== M85 800 metres ====
Pos	Athlete	Birthdate	Country	Result
1st place, gold medalist(s)	David Carr	15-Jun-1932	Australia	3:33.03
2nd place, silver medalist(s)	Earl Fee	22-Mar-1929	Canada	3:41.90
3rd place, bronze medalist(s)	Herbert E. Muller	12-Nov-1929	Germany	3:50.72

==== M90 800 metres ====
Pos	Athlete	Birthdate	Country	Result
1st place, gold medalist(s)	Bingxiang Fei	08-Dec-1927	China	4:27.99
2nd place, silver medalist(s)	Manuel Hernando Díaz Carrillo	14-Jul-1928	Colombia	4:30.29
3rd place, bronze medalist(s)	Luis H. Torres Rosa	19-Nov-1927	Puerto Rico	4:37.43

==== M95 800 metres ====
Pos	Athlete	Birthdate	Country	Result
1st place, gold medalist(s)	Lorenzo Juvenal Perez	30-Nov-1921	Argentina	7:56.93

=== 1500 metres ===
All finals held September 16, 2018

==== M35 1500 metres ====
Video on YouTube

Pos	Athlete	Birthdate	Country	Result
1st place, gold medalist(s)	Jose Manuel Cortés Medina	10-Jun-1983	Spain	4:02.52
2nd place, silver medalist(s)	Mohamed Rida Younes Chelloubi	18-Jun-1983	Spain	4:05.50
3rd place, bronze medalist(s)	Adel Hfaiedh	21-Oct-1982	Tunisia	4:05.50

==== M40 1500 metres ====
Video on YouTube

Pos	Athlete	Birthdate	Country	Result
1st place, gold medalist(s)	Jose Antonio Alcaraz Perez	24-Nov-1975	Spain	4:02.33
2nd place, silver medalist(s)	Juan Carlos Esteso Herrera	13-Oct-1976	Spain	4:03.87
3rd place, bronze medalist(s)	Bruno Anicet	04-Mar-1976	France	4:04.12

==== M45 1500 metres ====
Pos	Athlete	Birthdate	Country	Result
1st place, gold medalist(s)	Mark Symes	12-Oct-1968	Great Britain	4:13.90
2nd place, silver medalist(s)	Dean Richardson	31-Jan-1973	Great Britain	4:14.27
3rd place, bronze medalist(s)	Arthur van Dijk	09-Jan-1971	Netherlands	4:14.43

==== M50 1500 metres ====
Video on YouTube

Pos	Athlete	Birthdate	Country	Result
1st place, gold medalist(s)	Margus Kirt	28-Jun-1967	Estonia	4:16.66
2nd place, silver medalist(s)	Hassan El Azzouzi	05-May-1968	Italy	4:17.51
3rd place, bronze medalist(s)	Tom LeGan	15-Jul-1966	United States	4:17.62

==== M55 1500 metres ====
Video on YouTube

Pos	Athlete	Birthdate	Country	Result
1st place, gold medalist(s)	Guy Bracken	17-Dec-1961	Great Britain	4:30.10
2nd place, silver medalist(s)	Francisco García López	05-May-1961	Spain	4:31.56
3rd place, bronze medalist(s)	Geoffrey Peat	16-Aug-1963	Canada	4:31.68

==== M60 1500 metres ====
Video on YouTube

Pos	Athlete	Birthdate	Country	Result
1st place, gold medalist(s)	Cipriano Benito Ballesteros	02-Feb-1957	Spain	4:51.70
2nd place, silver medalist(s)	Alfredo Bonetti	07-Apr-1958	Italy	4:51.97
3rd place, bronze medalist(s)	Ian Calder	07-Sep-1957	New Zealand	4:53.00

==== M65 1500 metres ====
Video on YouTube

Pos	Athlete	Birthdate	Country	Result
1st place, gold medalist(s)	Joe Gough	10-Jan-1953	Ireland	4:49.63
2nd place, silver medalist(s)	Kevin Archer	19-Jun-1953	Great Britain	4:50.98
3rd place, bronze medalist(s)	Luciano Moser	28-Jan-1953	Italy	4:57.58

==== M70 1500 metres ====
Video on YouTube

Pos	Athlete	Birthdate	Country	Result
1st place, gold medalist(s)	Hans Smeets	23-Feb-1947	Netherlands	5:14.48
2nd place, silver medalist(s)	Kevin Solomon	21-Apr-1947	Australia	5:17.48
3rd place, bronze medalist(s)	Denis Macagno	01-Apr-1947	France	5:20.64

==== M75 1500 metres ====
Pos	Athlete	Birthdate	Country	Result
1st place, gold medalist(s)	Jean-Louis Esnault	19-Jan-1940	France	5:53.88
2nd place, silver medalist(s)	Paul Simonsson	18-Mar-1943	Sweden	5:55.21
3rd place, bronze medalist(s)	Tormod Boenes	09-Apr-1942	Norway	5:55.44

==== M80 1500 metres ====
Pos	Athlete	Birthdate	Country	Result
1st place, gold medalist(s)	Manuel Alonso Domingo	21-Mar-1936	Spain	6:20.57
2nd place, silver medalist(s)	Angel Cano Alcolea	06-Jan-1938	Spain	7:02.21
3rd place, bronze medalist(s)	Norberto Soares	08-Jun-1937	Brazil	7:07.12

==== M85 1500 metres ====
Pos	Athlete	Birthdate	Country	Result
1st place, gold medalist(s)	David Carr	15-Jun-1932	Australia	7:19.89
2nd place, silver medalist(s)	Herbert E. Muller	12-Nov-1929	Germany	8:06.77
3rd place, bronze medalist(s)	Arne Hamarsland	24-Jul-1933	Norway	8:14.45

==== M90 1500 metres ====
Pos	Athlete	Birthdate	Country	Result
1st place, gold medalist(s)	Bingxiang Fei	08-Dec-1927	China	9:37.40
2nd place, silver medalist(s)	Luis H. Torres Rosa	19-Nov-1927	Puerto Rico	10:56.76
3rd place, bronze medalist(s)	Zhiyong Wang	..-..-1924	China	11:13.33

==== M95 1500 metres ====
Pos	Athlete	Birthdate	Country	Result
1st place, gold medalist(s)	Gabriele Bianchi	27-Aug-1923	Italy	16:09.84
2nd place, silver medalist(s)	Lorenzo Juvenal Perez	30-Nov-1921	Argentina	16:30.51

=== 5000 metres ===
All finals held September 12, 2018

==== M35 5000 metres ====
41 athletes, 2 heats timed final. All medalists came from heat 2

Pos	Athlete	Birthdate	Country	Result
1st place, gold medalist(s)	Isaac Rico De La Fuente	24-Jan-1980	Spain	14:53.07
2nd place, silver medalist(s)	Pedro Vega	22-Apr-1982	Spain	15:08.11
3rd place, bronze medalist(s)	Nelson Oliveira	26-Aug-1981	Portugal	15:09.96

==== M40 5000 metres ====
51 athletes, 3 heats timed final. All medalists came from heat 3

Pos	Athlete	Birthdate	Country	Result
1st place, gold medalist(s)	Samuel Ndereba	02-Feb-1977	Kenya	14:25.43
2nd place, silver medalist(s)	Silas Sang	21-Aug-1978	Kenya	14:25.95
3rd place, bronze medalist(s)	Eliud Kirui	15-Aug-1975	Kenya	14:34.12

==== M45 5000 metres ====
51 athletes, 3 heats timed final. All medalists came from heat 3

Pos	Athlete	Birthdate	Country	Result
1st place, gold medalist(s)	Peter Bii	07-Apr-1973	Kenya	15:01.23
2nd place, silver medalist(s)	Joshua Kipchumba	12-Dec-1968	Kenya	15:27.01
3rd place, bronze medalist(s)	Julián Ramírez García	03-May-1971	Spain	15:40.12

==== M50 5000 metres ====
66 athletes, 3 heats timed final. All medalists came from heat 3

Pos	Athlete	Birthdate	Country	Result
1st place, gold medalist(s)	Patrick Vandebosch	14-Feb-1966	Belgium	15:47.48
2nd place, silver medalist(s)	Tim Hartley	26-May-1968	Great Britain	15:50.55
3rd place, bronze medalist(s)	Joaquim Figueiredo	17-Feb-1967	Portugal	15:51.64

==== M55 5000 metres ====
63 athletes, 3 heats timed final. All medalists came from heat 3

Pos	Athlete	Birthdate	Country	Result
1st place, gold medalist(s)	Nat Larson	15-Jun-1962	United States	16:20.62
2nd place, silver medalist(s)	Francisco García López	05-May-1961	Spain	16:29.48
3rd place, bronze medalist(s)	Guy Bracken	17-Dec-1961	Great Britain	16:33.33

==== M60 5000 metres ====
67 athletes, 3 heats timed final. All medalists came from heat 3

Pos	Athlete	Birthdate	Country	Result
1st place, gold medalist(s)	Gregorio Saiz Sanchez	30-Dec-1957	Spain	17:32.38
2nd place, silver medalist(s)	Alastair Prangnell	31-Aug-1958	New Zealand	17:33.75
3rd place, bronze medalist(s)	Alastair Walker	25-May-1956	Great Britain	17:36.08

==== M65 5000 metres ====
59 athletes, 3 heats timed final. All medalists came from heat 3

Pos	Athlete	Birthdate	Country	Result
1st place, gold medalist(s)	Stephen Kamande	..-..-1952	Kenya	18:36.61
2nd place, silver medalist(s)	Bob Bradbury	22-May-1953	Great Britain	18:53.46
3rd place, bronze medalist(s)	Lars Juel Jensen	29-May-1953	Denmark	19:10.88

==== M70 5000 metres ====
47 athletes, 2 heats timed final. All medalists came from heat 2

Pos	Athlete	Birthdate	Country	Result
1st place, gold medalist(s)	Kauko Kuningas	13-Apr-1948	Finland	19:53.42
2nd place, silver medalist(s)	Denis Macagno	01-Apr-1947	France	19:56.61
3rd place, bronze medalist(s)	Antonio Mohedano Rodríguez	18-Aug-1945	Spain	20:08.33

==== M75 5000 metres ====
33 athletes, 2 heats timed final. All medalists came from heat 2

Pos	Athlete	Birthdate	Country	Result
1st place, gold medalist(s)	Victor Shirley	..-..-1943	Great Britain	21:08.94
2nd place, silver medalist(s)	Martin Ford	13-Aug-1943	Great Britain	21:11.63
3rd place, bronze medalist(s)	Vincent Basista	25-Jan-1942	Slovakia	21:26.33

==== M80 5000 metres ====
Pos	Athlete	Birthdate	Country	Result
1st place, gold medalist(s)	Bernardino Pacheco Pereira	16-Mar-1936	Portugal	22:34.49
2nd place, silver medalist(s)	Fidel Díaz Méndez	24-Apr-1938	Mexico	23:50.25
3rd place, bronze medalist(s)	Gilbert Burtel	30-Jul-1937	France	23:56.72

==== M85 5000 metres ====
Pos	Athlete	Birthdate	Country	Result
1st place, gold medalist(s)	Richard Pitcairn-Knowles	21-Dec-1932	Great Britain	34:21.12
2nd place, silver medalist(s)	Sadao Tabira	23-Jun-1933	Japan	34:53.87
3rd place, bronze medalist(s)	Colin Silcock-Delaney	13-Oct-1932	Australia	40:40.44

==== M90 5000 metres ====
Pos	Athlete	Birthdate	Country	Result
1st place, gold medalist(s)	Bingxiang Fei	08-Dec-1927	China	36:30.09
2nd place, silver medalist(s)	Manuel Hernando Díaz Carrillo	..-..-1928	Colombia	40:09.31
3rd place, bronze medalist(s)	Zhiyong Wang	..-..-1924	China	42:01.06

=== 8km Cross country running ===
Held September 05, 2018

==== M35 8km Cross country running ====
32 athletes

Pos	Athlete	Birthdate	Country	Result
1st place, gold medalist(s)	Pedro Vega Ballesteros	22-Apr-1982	Spain	24:51
2nd place, silver medalist(s)	Jonas Roels	24-Nov-1981	Belgium	25:05
3rd place, bronze medalist(s)	Ayoze Pérez Tejera	02-May-1980	Spain	25:17

==== M40 8km Cross country running ====
50 athletes

Pos	Athlete	Birthdate	Country	Result
1st place, gold medalist(s)	Javier Díaz Carretero	17-Apr-1976	Spain	24:42
2nd place, silver medalist(s)	Jose Antonio Alcaraz Pérez	24-Nov-1975	Spain	24:47
3rd place, bronze medalist(s)	Francisco Javier Martínez Fernández	27-May-1977	Spain	25:10

==== M45 8km Cross country running ====
51 athletes

Pos	Athlete	Birthdate	Country	Result
1st place, gold medalist(s)	Peter Bii	07-Apr-1973	Kenya	24:08
2nd place, silver medalist(s)	Davide Figueiredo	23-Apr-1971	Portugal	25:30
3rd place, bronze medalist(s)	Simon Baines	14-Mar-1971	Great Britain	26:14

==== M50 8km Cross country running ====
71 athletes

Pos	Athlete	Birthdate	Country	Result
1st place, gold medalist(s)	Miguel Molero-Eichwein	10-May-1968	Germany	25:42
2nd place, silver medalist(s)	Sancho Ayala Abad	05-Oct-1967	Spain	26:52
3rd place, bronze medalist(s)	Agustín Molina García	17-Feb-1967	Spain	26:54

==== M55 8km Cross country running ====
63 athletes

Pos	Athlete	Birthdate	Country	Result
1st place, gold medalist(s)	Marek Dziegielewski	17-Jul-1962	Poland	27:02
2nd place, silver medalist(s)	Bruce Graham		Australia	27:08
3rd place, bronze medalist(s)	Edvaldo Pereira de Souza	04-Sep-1959	Brazil	27:20

==== M60 8km Cross country running ====
72 athletes

Pos	Athlete	Birthdate	Country	Result
1st place, gold medalist(s)	Gregorio Saiz Sánchez	30-Dec-1957	Spain	27:52
2nd place, silver medalist(s)	Tore Axelsson	19-Sep-1957	Sweden	28:10
3rd place, bronze medalist(s)	Alastair Prangnell	31-Aug-1958	New Zealand	28:14

==== M65 8km Cross country running ====
55 athletes

Pos	Athlete	Birthdate	Country	Result
1st place, gold medalist(s)	Rolando Di Marco	03-Sep-1950	Italy	31:22
2nd place, silver medalist(s)	David Oxland	21-May-1951	Great Britain	31:25
3rd place, bronze medalist(s)	Dennis Wylie	23-Nov-1952	Australia	31:34

==== M70 6km Cross country running ====
55 athletes

Pos	Athlete	Birthdate	Country	Result
1st place, gold medalist(s)	Kauko Kuningas	13-Apr-1948	Finland	24:13
2nd place, silver medalist(s)	Antonio Mohedano Rodriguez	18-Aug-1945	Spain	24:17
3rd place, bronze medalist(s)	Erik Leyseele	01-Jun-1948	Belgium	24:29

==== M75 6km Cross country running ====
32 athletes

Pos	Athlete	Birthdate	Country	Result
1st place, gold medalist(s)	Félix Chino Choque	25-May-1942	Bolivia	26:49
2nd place, silver medalist(s)	Martin Ford	13-Aug-1943	Great Britain	27:09
3rd place, bronze medalist(s)	Aldo Borghesi	03-Mar-1943	Italy	27:22

==== M80 6km Cross country running ====
20 athletes

Pos	Athlete	Birthdate	Country	Result
1st place, gold medalist(s)	Bernardino Pacheco Pereira	16-Mar-1936	Portugal	28:14
2nd place, silver medalist(s)	Fidel Diaz Mendez	24-Apr-1938	Mexico	29:14
3rd place, bronze medalist(s)	Klemens Wittig	09-Aug-1937	Germany	29:56

==== M85 6km Cross country running ====
Pos	Athlete	Birthdate	Country	Result
1st place, gold medalist(s)	Herbert E. Muller	12-Nov-1929	Germany	45:34
2nd place, silver medalist(s)	Sadao Tabira	23-Jun-1933	Japan	46:00
3rd place, bronze medalist(s)	Samuel Guerra Tapia	20-Dec-1932	Chile	48:31

=== 10 km road ===
Held September 09, 2018

==== M35 10 km road ====
56 athletes

Pos	Athlete	Birthdate	Country	Result
1st place, gold medalist(s)	Nelson Oliveira	26-Aug-1981	Portugal	31:53
2nd place, silver medalist(s)	Sean McGrath		Ireland	32:13
3rd place, bronze medalist(s)	Iván Pórtoles Blasco	31-Oct-1978	Spain	32:33

==== M40 10 km road ====
72 athletes

Pos	Athlete	Birthdate	Country	Result
1st place, gold medalist(s)	Samuel Ndereba	02-Feb-1977	Kenya	30:43
2nd place, silver medalist(s)	Fredrik Uhrbom	13-Aug-1977	Sweden	31:08
3rd place, bronze medalist(s)	David Langat		Kenya	31:27

==== M45 10 km road ====
76 athletes

Pos	Athlete	Birthdate	Country	Result
1st place, gold medalist(s)	Peter Bii	07-Apr-1973	Kenya	31:00
2nd place, silver medalist(s)	Juan Antonio Cuadrillero Barranco	06-Oct-1971	Spain	32:02
3rd place, bronze medalist(s)	Davide Figueiredo	23-Apr-1971	Portugal	32:10

==== M50 10 km road ====
85 athletes

Pos	Athlete	Birthdate	Country	Result
1st place, gold medalist(s)	Miguel Molero-Eichwein	10-May-1968	Germany	32:36
2nd place, silver medalist(s)	Edo Baart	16-Apr-1968	Netherlands	33:37
3rd place, bronze medalist(s)	Joaquim Figueiredo	17-Feb-1967	Portugal	33:42

==== M55 10 km road ====
59 athletes

Pos	Athlete	Birthdate	Country	Result
1st place, gold medalist(s)	Francisco García López	05-May-1961	Spain	34:41
2nd place, silver medalist(s)	Marek Dziegielewski	17-Jul-1962	Poland	34:46
3rd place, bronze medalist(s)	Edvaldo Pereira de Souza	04-Sep-1959	Brazil	34:47

==== M60 10 km road ====
83 athletes

Pos	Athlete	Birthdate	Country	Result
1st place, gold medalist(s)	Alastair Walker	25-May-1956	Great Britain	35:58
2nd place, silver medalist(s)	Paul Mingay	20-Mar-1957	Great Britain	36:38
3rd place, bronze medalist(s)	Jon Cross	...-...-1957	Great Britain	37:20

==== M65 10 km road ====
47 athletes

Pos	Athlete	Birthdate	Country	Result
1st place, gold medalist(s)	Román Morales Soto	12-Aug-1953	Spain	36:57
2nd place, silver medalist(s)	Paul Whelpton	..-..-1952	Great Britain	39:20
3rd place, bronze medalist(s)	Rolando Di Marco	03-Sep-1950	Italy	39:26

==== M70 10 km road ====
41 athletes

Pos	Athlete	Birthdate	Country	Result
1st place, gold medalist(s)	Bert Schalkwijk	09-Apr-1948	Netherlands	40:08
2nd place, silver medalist(s)	Kauko Kuningas	13-Apr-1948	Finland	41:24
3rd place, bronze medalist(s)	Antonio Mohedano Rodríguez	18-Aug-1945	Spain	41:56

==== M75 10 km road ====
23 athletes

Pos	Athlete	Birthdate	Country	Result
1st place, gold medalist(s)	Martin Ford	13-Aug-1943	Great Britain	44:44
2nd place, silver medalist(s)	Vincent Basista	25-Jan-1942	Slovakia	45:25
3rd place, bronze medalist(s)	Aldo Borghesi	03-Mar-1943	Italy	46:11

==== M80 10 km road ====
13 athletes

Pos	Athlete	Birthdate	Country	Result
1st place, gold medalist(s)	Fidel Díaz Méndez	24-Apr-1938	Mexico	47:14
2nd place, silver medalist(s)	Bernardino Pacheco Pereira	16-Mar-1936	Portugal	47:34
3rd place, bronze medalist(s)	Constantino Fernando Del Castillo Barrientos	11-May-1935	Spain	51:17

==== M85 10 km road ====
Pos	Athlete	Birthdate	Country	Result
1st place, gold medalist(s)	Angelo Squadrone	21-Feb-1929	Italy	1h15:13
2nd place, silver medalist(s)	Sadao Tabira	23-Jun-1933	Japan	1h35:21

==== M90 10 km road ====
Pos	Athlete	Birthdate	Country	Result
1st place, gold medalist(s)	Zhiyong Wang	..-..-1924	China	1h27:56

=== Short hurdles ===
All finals held September 15, 2018

==== M35 110 metres hurdles ====
Wind: -0.7

Pos	Athlete	Birthdate	Country	Result
1st place, gold medalist(s)	Damien Broothaerts	13-Mar-1983	Belgium	13.89
2nd place, silver medalist(s)	Hiroyuki Fukuda	22-Dec-1978	Japan	14.41
3rd place, bronze medalist(s)	Jackson Hinton	08-Jul-1981	Canada	14.51

==== M40 110 metres hurdles ====
Wind: -1.3

Pos	Athlete	Birthdate	Country	Result
1st place, gold medalist(s)	Jan Schindzielorz	08-Aug-1978	Germany	14.17
2nd place, silver medalist(s)	Mensah Elliott	29-Aug-1976	Great Britain	14.76
3rd place, bronze medalist(s)	Edivaldo Monteiro	28-Apr-1976	Portugal	14.81

==== M45 110 metres hurdles ====
Wind: -1.5

Pos	Athlete	Birthdate	Country	Result
1st place, gold medalist(s)	Gary Smith	25-Sep-1970	Great Britain	16.14
2nd place, silver medalist(s)	Don Drummond	06-Jun-1969	United States	16.98
3rd place, bronze medalist(s)	Bjorn Maier	28-Jun-1973	Germany	17.16

==== M50 100 metres hurdles ====
Wind: -0.9

Pos	Athlete	Birthdate	Country	Result
1st place, gold medalist(s)	Renzo Romano	25-Feb-1967	Italy	14.32
2nd place, silver medalist(s)	Karnell Vickers	21-Feb-1967	United States	14.34
3rd place, bronze medalist(s)	Igor Popov	17-Oct-1966	France	14.64

==== M55 100 metres hurdles ====
Wind: -0.6

Pos	Athlete	Birthdate	Country	Result
1st place, gold medalist(s)	Damon Blakemore	26-Mar-1962	United States	14.62
2nd place, silver medalist(s)	Peter Grimes	10-Feb-1959	United States	14.75
3rd place, bronze medalist(s)	Angel Estuardo Díaz Granillo	29-Oct-1961	Guatemala	14.92

==== M60 100 metres hurdles ====
Wind: -1.6

Pos	Athlete	Birthdate	Country	Result
1st place, gold medalist(s)	Tennyson James	25-Oct-1957	Great Britain	15.55
2nd place, silver medalist(s)	Hubert Indra	24-Mar-1957	Italy	15.76
3rd place, bronze medalist(s)	Wieslaw Musial	20-Oct-1957	Poland	16.04

==== M65 100 metres hurdles ====
Wind: -1.5

Pos	Athlete	Birthdate	Country	Result
1st place, gold medalist(s)	Wolfgang Ritte	07-Jan-1953	Germany	16.26
2nd place, silver medalist(s)	Yau-Ming Max Siu	04-Dec-1952	Hong Kong	16.80
3rd place, bronze medalist(s)	Ivo Strnad	30-Mar-1951	Czech Republic	16.88

==== M70 80 metres hurdles ====
Wind: -1.2

Pos	Athlete	Birthdate	Country	Result
1st place, gold medalist(s)	Valdis Cela	01-Feb-1948	Latvia	13.81
2nd place, silver medalist(s)	Milan Beliansky	07-Nov-1944	Slovakia	13.90
3rd place, bronze medalist(s)	Osamu Ogasawara	11-Dec-1947	Japan	13.93

==== M75 80 metres hurdles ====
Wind: -1.2

Pos	Athlete	Birthdate	Country	Result
1st place, gold medalist(s)	Barry Ferguson	12-Nov-1941	Great Britain	15.57
2nd place, silver medalist(s)	John Yuan-Chung Hsu	10-Jan-1942	Chinese Taipei	15.58
3rd place, bronze medalist(s)	Frans van Boven	29-Jul-1943	Netherlands	16.94

==== M80 80 metres hurdles ====
Wind: +0.1

Pos	Athlete	Birthdate	Country	Result
1st place, gold medalist(s)	Knut Henrik Skramstad	10-Jan-1937	Norway	17.22
2nd place, silver medalist(s)	Paulus Makkonen	30-Sep-1937	Finland	17.29
3rd place, bronze medalist(s)	Ioannis Bellos	08-Dec-1936	Greece	17.34

==== M85 80 metres hurdles ====
Wind: +0.4

Pos	Athlete	Birthdate	Country	Result
1st place, gold medalist(s)	Hardev Singh	10-Jan-1932	India	21.87
2nd place, silver medalist(s)	Yide Shi	15-Jan-1933	China	23.77

=== Long hurdles ===
All finals held September 7, 2018

==== M35 400 metres hurdles ====
Pos	Athlete	Birthdate	Country	Result
1st place, gold medalist(s)	Pieter Koekemoer	12-Jan-1982	South Africa	52.93
2nd place, silver medalist(s)	Andrew Clements	28-Nov-1982	Great Britain	54.73
3rd place, bronze medalist(s)	Fabio Fedele	25-Nov-1982	Italy	55.33

==== M40 400 metres hurdles ====
Pos	Athlete	Birthdate	Country	Result
1st place, gold medalist(s)	Edivaldo Monteiro	28-Apr-1976	Portugal	54.63
2nd place, silver medalist(s)	James Atteen Fernández	01-Jun-1975	Spain	55.27
3rd place, bronze medalist(s)	Cedric Felip	02-Aug-1978	France	57.31

==== M45 400 metres hurdles ====
Pos	Athlete	Birthdate	Country	Result
1st place, gold medalist(s)	Toine van Beckhoven	01-Jan-1970	Netherlands	57.02
2nd place, silver medalist(s)	Winston Chambers	11-Feb-1969	Jamaica	58.16
3rd place, bronze medalist(s)	Mats Holmberg	17-Apr-1973	Sweden	58.33

==== M50 400 metres hurdles ====
Pos	Athlete	Birthdate	Country	Result
1st place, gold medalist(s)	Karnell Vickers	21-Feb-1967	United States	58.74
2nd place, silver medalist(s)	Donato Martinez Mateo	19-Aug-1968	Spain	59.96
3rd place, bronze medalist(s)	Oleksandr Syrmolotov	09-Aug-1968	Ukraine	1:00.33

==== M55 400 metres hurdles ====
Pos	Athlete	Birthdate	Country	Result
1st place, gold medalist(s)	Jonathan Tilt	05-Aug-1962	Great Britain	59.80
2nd place, silver medalist(s)	Luke De Biasi	28-Jul-1963	Australia	1:01.42
3rd place, bronze medalist(s)	Damon Blakemore	26-Mar-1962	United States	1:01.66

==== M60 300 metres hurdles ====
Pos	Athlete	Birthdate	Country	Result
1st place, gold medalist(s)	Andrzej Sut	25-Sep-1957	Poland	46.39
2nd place, silver medalist(s)	Detlef Dopping	..-..-1956	Germany	47.00
3rd place, bronze medalist(s)	Juan de Dios Velez Castrillon		Colombia	47.31

==== M65 300 metres hurdles ====
Pos	Athlete	Birthdate	Country	Result
1st place, gold medalist(s)	David Ortman	28-Mar-1953	United States	47.66
2nd place, silver medalist(s)	George Haywood	30-Sep-1952	United States	47.67
3rd place, bronze medalist(s)	Kazuo Ishida	22-Feb-1953	Japan	48.98

==== M70 300 metres hurdles ====
Pos	Athlete	Birthdate	Country	Result
1st place, gold medalist(s)	Masahiko Yamasaki	18-Aug-1947	Japan	50.76
2nd place, silver medalist(s)	Yoshio Aiba	23-Feb-1948	Japan	51.42
3rd place, bronze medalist(s)	Ryszard Lech	01-Mar-1948	Canada	52.58

==== M75 300 metres hurdles ====
Pos	Athlete	Birthdate	Country	Result
1st place, gold medalist(s)	Yuan-Chung Hsu	10-Jan-1942	Chinese Taipei	53.13
2nd place, silver medalist(s)	Guido Mueller	22-Dec-1938	Germany	55.81
3rd place, bronze medalist(s)	Sten Alvar Johannes Haglund	20-Jul-1943	Finland	56.55

==== M80 200 metres hurdles ====
Wind: -0.8

Pos	Athlete	Birthdate	Country	Result
1st place, gold medalist(s)	Alan Carter	30-Jun-1937	Great Britain	38.73
2nd place, silver medalist(s)	Francisco Morrongiello	31-Jan-1938	Argentina	38.90
3rd place, bronze medalist(s)	Oswald Rogers	28-Sep-1937	Trinidad and Tobago	40.13

==== M85 200 metres hurdles ====
Wind: -0.4

Pos	Athlete	Birthdate	Country	Result
1st place, gold medalist(s)	Yide Shi	15-Jan-1933	China	45.87
2nd place, silver medalist(s)	Hardev Singh	10-Jan-1932	India	50.72

=== Steeplechase ===
Held September 7, 2018

==== M35 3000 metres steeplechase ====
17 athletes, 1 heat.

Pos	Athlete	Birthdate	Country	Result
1st place, gold medalist(s)	Diego De La Fuente Ibáñez	16-Nov-1982	Spain	9:27.39
2nd place, silver medalist(s)	Santiago Navarro	14-May-1983	Spain	9:29.69
3rd place, bronze medalist(s)	Adel Hfaiedh	21-Oct-1982	Tunisia	9:35.86

==== M40 3000 metres steeplechase ====
17 athletes, 1 heat.

Pos	Athlete	Birthdate	Country	Result
1st place, gold medalist(s)	Eliud Kirui	15-Aug-1975	Kenya	9:09.14
2nd place, silver medalist(s)	Antonio David Jiménez Pentinel	18-Feb-1977	Spain	9:14.29
3rd place, bronze medalist(s)	Ciaran Doherty	12-Aug-1974	Ireland	9:28.30

==== M45 3000 metres steeplechase ====
22 athletes, 1 heat.

Pos	Athlete	Birthdate	Country	Result
1st place, gold medalist(s)	Ole Kristian Heggheim	10-Jun-1972	Norway	9:39.51
2nd place, silver medalist(s)	Juan Antonio Cuadrillero Barranco	06-Oct-1971	Spain	9:40.95
3rd place, bronze medalist(s)	Pascal Ruiz	23-Mar-1969	France	9:54.26

==== M50 3000 metres steeplechase ====
28 athletes, 2 timed heats. All medalists ran in heat 2

Pos	Athlete	Birthdate	Country	Result
1st place, gold medalist(s)	Christophe Le Bihan	25-Jan-1968	France	10:11.53
2nd place, silver medalist(s)	Miguel Angel Fernández Cobo	11-Jun-1968	Spain	10:17.12
3rd place, bronze medalist(s)	Heriberto Marderwald	10-Feb-1968	Argentina	10:36.39

==== M55 3000 metres steeplechase ====
24 athletes, 2 timed heats.

Pos	Athlete	Birthdate	Country	Heat	Result
1st place, gold medalist(s)	Gilles Pelletier	27-Nov-1952	France	2	10:30.24
2nd place, silver medalist(s)	Anders Toll	18-Sep-1961	Sweden	2	11:03.17
3rd place, bronze medalist(s)	Marek Dziegielewski	17-Jul-1962	Poland	1	11:07.69

==== M60 2000 metres steeplechase ====
25 athletes, 2 timed heats.

Video on YouTube

Pos	Athlete	Birthdate	Country	Heat	Result
1st place, gold medalist(s)	Stanislaw Lancucki	01-Mar-1958	Poland	2	7:11.37
2nd place, silver medalist(s)	Francisco Aragón Muñoz	17-Nov-1954	Spain	2	7:17.18
3rd place, bronze medalist(s)	Jose Ramírez	25-Jul-1955	Colombia	1	7:42.12

==== M65 2000 metres steeplechase ====
24 athletes, 2 timed heats. All medalists ran in heat 2

Pos	Athlete	Birthdate	Country	Result
1st place, gold medalist(s)	Adriano Montini	21-Aug-1953	Italy	7:44.08
2nd place, silver medalist(s)	Tommy Karlsson	14-Jan-1952	Sweden	7:52.32
3rd place, bronze medalist(s)	Giovanni Finielli	14-Jul-1950	Italy	8:01.38

==== M70 2000 metres steeplechase ====
19 athletes, 1 heat

Pos	Athlete	Birthdate	Country	Result
1st place, gold medalist(s)	Alex Swiecicki	26-Jul-1948	Great Britain	8:43.27
2nd place, silver medalist(s)	Harald Odegaard	21-Jan-1946	Norway	8:54.18
3rd place, bronze medalist(s)	Robbie Costmeyer	18-Dec-1946	Australia	8:58.68

==== M75 2000 metres steeplechase ====
11 athletes

Pos	Athlete	Birthdate	Country	Result
1st place, gold medalist(s)	Félix Chino Choque	25-May-1942	Bolivia	9:22.19
2nd place, silver medalist(s)	Yuquan Sun	02-Mar-1942	China	9:27.05
3rd place, bronze medalist(s)	Peter Sandery	21-Jun-1941	Australia	9:58.63

==== M80 2000 metres steeplechase ====
Pos	Athlete	Birthdate	Country	Result
1st place, gold medalist(s)	Ryosuke Takahara	07-Jun-1935	Japan	10:53.34 *
2nd place, silver medalist(s)	Morland Smith	07-Nov-1937	Australia	12:13.02
3rd place, bronze medalist(s)	Manuel Navarro	16-May-1938	Spain	14:39.98 *

- Rule 169.7 is noted in the results but no disqualification indicated. Rule 169.7 defines properly clearing the water jump.

==== M85 2000 metres steeplechase ====
Pos	Athlete	Birthdate	Country	Result
1st place, gold medalist(s)	David Carr	15-Jun-1932	Australia	11:24.55
2nd place, silver medalist(s)	Samuel Guerra Tapia	20-Dec-1932	Chile	15:04.69 *
3rd place, bronze medalist(s)	Colin Silcock-Delaney	13-Oct-1932	Australia	15:47.52

- Rule 169.7 is noted in the results but no disqualification indicated. Rule 169.7 defines properly clearing the water jump.

=== 4x100 metres relay ===
All relays September 16, 2018

==== M35 4x100 metres relay ====
11 teams, 2 heats timed final

Pos	Country	Members/Age	Heat	Result
1st place, gold medalist(s)	Great Britain	1) Stewart Marshall 2) Leroy Slue; 3) Peter Hall 4) Diekumo Anthony	2	42.67
2nd place, silver medalist(s)	France	1) Georges Egoua 2) Guillaume Bollaert; 3) Thierry Vilsans 4) Imad Rahoui	2	43.92
3rd place, bronze medalist(s)	Canada	1) Andre Mitchell 2) Justin Sinclair; 3) Luke Xinxiao Wang 4) Jackson Hinton	1	43.99

==== M40 4x100 metres relay ====
12 teams, 2 heats timed final

Pos	Country	Members/Age	Heat	Result
1st place, gold medalist(s)	Great Britain	1) Mensah Elliott 2) Tamunonengiye-Ofori Ossai; 3) Jason Carty 4) Dominic Bradley	1	42.56
2nd place, silver medalist(s)	Spain	1) Jonatan Orozco Moreno 2) Luis Palma; 3) Sergio Repiso Gutiérrez 4) Mario Soto Lara	2	44.21
3rd place, bronze medalist(s)	Portugal	1) Selwin Wever 2) Ricardo Lemos; 3) Edivaldo Monteiro 4) Ricardo Carvalho	2	44.90

==== M45 4x100 metres relay ====
7 teams

Pos	Country	Members/Age	Heat	Result
1st place, gold medalist(s)	Japan	1) So Takei 2) Takeshi Fukuzato; 3) Masashi Sato 4) Nobuharu Asahara	1	43.77
2nd place, silver medalist(s)	United States	1) Don Drummond 2) Andre Millar; 3) Lyndell Pittman 4) Edward Rhyne	2	45.37
3rd place, bronze medalist(s)	South Africa	1) Alec Michael Toll 2) Anthony Solomons; 3) Maurice Fortuin 4) Johann Coetzee	2	47.60

==== M50 4x100 metres relay ====
12 teams, 2 heats as timed finals

Pos	Country	Members/Age	Heat	Result
1st place, gold medalist(s)	United States	1) John Cormier 2) Clinton Aurelien; 3) Lee Bridges 4) Karnell Vickers	2	45.94
2nd place, silver medalist(s)	Italy	1) Carlo Canaccini 2) Renzo Romano; 3) Roberto Barontini 4) Pierluigi Acciaccaferri	1	46.62
3rd place, bronze medalist(s)	Canada	1) Christopher Warburton 2) Christian Lemassif; 3) Michael Sherar 4) Serge Faucher	2	46.67

==== M55 4x100 metres relay ====
10 teams, 2 heats as timed finals, all medalists came from heat 1

Pos	Country	Members/Age	Heat	Result
1st place, gold medalist(s)	United States	1) Robert Foster 2) Damon Blakemore; 3) William Yelverton 4) Don McGee	2	47.40
2nd place, silver medalist(s)	Great Britain	1) Ronnie Hunter 2) Neil Tunstall; 3) Paul Guest 4) John Wright	1	47.77
3rd place, bronze medalist(s)	Australia	1) Colin Smith 2) Darren Hughes; 3) Michael Cassidy 4) John Hilditch	1	48.78

==== M60 4x100 metres relay ====
9 teams

Pos	Country	Members/Age	Heat	Result
1st place, gold medalist(s)	United States	1) Stephen Gould 2) Thomas Jones; 3) Anthony Searles 4) Val Barnwell	2	48.66
2nd place, silver medalist(s)	Germany	1) Matthias Konopka 2) Roland Eberle; 3) Gunter Langenbach 4) Gerhard Zorn	1	50.68
3rd place, bronze medalist(s)	Spain	1) Javier Tabares 2) Manuel Reyes; 3) Mariano Sánchez 4) Juan Carlos Rodríguez	1	52.16

==== M65 4x100 metres relay ====
5 teams

Pos	Country	Members/Age	Result
1st place, gold medalist(s)	United States	1) David Ortman 2) Thaddeus Wilson; 3) George Haywood 4) Charles Allie	51.15
2nd place, silver medalist(s)	Great Britain	1) Adrian Essex 2) Simon Barrett; 3) Walwyn Franklyn 4) Stephen Peters	51.63
3rd place, bronze medalist(s)	Germany	1) Gert Brenner 2) Karl Dorschner; 3) Winfried Heckner 4) Wolfgang Ritte	52.45

==== M70 4x100 metres relay ====
7 teams

Pos	Country	Members/Age	Result
1st place, gold medalist(s)	Japan	1) Osamu Ogasawara 2) Masahiko Yamasaki; 3) Yasuro Narumi 4) Yoshio Aiba	55.22
2nd place, silver medalist(s)	Spain	1) Ángel Gómez 2) Juan Colmenarejo; 3) José Santamaría Enríquez 4) José Luis Romero	58.77
3rd place, bronze medalist(s)	Germany	1) Udo Lippoldes 2) Friedhelm Adorf; 3) Sigurd van Riesen 4) Guenter Hartung	58.95

==== M75 4x100 metres relay ====
8 teams

Pos	Country	Members/Age	Result
1st place, gold medalist(s)	Germany	1) Guido Mueller 2) Fritz Reichle; 3) Heinz Keck 4) Hartmut Kraemer	58.87
2nd place, silver medalist(s)	United States	1) Howard Booth 2) Mack Stewart; 3) Curtis Morgan 4) Robert Lida	1:02.85
3rd place, bronze medalist(s)	Great Britain	1) Alan Forse 2) Phil Brennan; 3) Winston Laing 4) Barry Ferguson	1:04.35

==== M80 4x100 metres relay ====
Pos	Country	Members/Age	Result
1st place, gold medalist(s)	Germany	1) Gerhard Adams 2) Karl Schmid; 3) Klemens Wittig 4) Horst Hufnagel	1:05.95
2nd place, silver medalist(s)	Finland	1) Paulus Makkonen 2) Ermo Kalevo; 3) Kauno Anttila 4) Par Max Ingmar Granbacka	1:09.59
3rd place, bronze medalist(s)	Japan	1) Hiroo Tanaka 2) Muneyoshi Ono; 3) Ryosuke Takahara 4) Kiyoshi Konoike	1:10.73

==== M85 4x100 metres relay ====
Pos	Country	Members/Age	Result
1st place, gold medalist(s)	China	1) Bingxiang Fei 2) Yide Shi; 3) Guiben Sun 4) Fucheng Qiu	1:26.43

=== 4x400 metres relay ===
All relays September 16, 2018

==== M35 4x400 metres relay ====
12 teams, 2 heats timed final

Pos	Country	Members/Age	Heat	Result
1st place, gold medalist(s)	Great Britain	1) Andrew Parker 2) Peter Hall; 3) Stewart Marshall 4) Richard Beardsell	1	3:23.74
2nd place, silver medalist(s)	France	1) Mustapha Marzouq 2) Stéphane Michaud; 3) Imad Rahoui 4) Guillaume Bollaert	2	3:26.50
3rd place, bronze medalist(s)	Spain	1) Julián Mateo Ferrer Canas 2) Ruben Alba Arias; 3) Alfonso Manuel Romero Moreno 4) Fernando Unzu	1	3:29.64

==== M40 4x400 metres relay ====
9 teams

Pos	Country	Members/Age	Result
1st place, gold medalist(s)	Spain	1) Octavio Pérez Calatayud 2) Ramón Borente González; 3) Sergio Repiso Gutiérrez 4) Ricardo Menéndez González	3:22.04
2nd place, silver medalist(s)	Great Britain	1) David Brown 2) Martyn Morant; 3) Tamunonengiye-Ofori Ossai 4) Gavin Stephens	3:22.32
3rd place, bronze medalist(s)	France	1) Bruno Anicet 2) Mickael Rince; 3) Rachid Farid 4) Sebastien Leveque	3:33.03

==== M45 4x400 metres relay ====
8 teams

Pos	Country	Members/Age	Result
1st place, gold medalist(s)	Australia	1) Mark Giglio 2) Nathan Crowley; 3) Shane Ezard 4) Andrew Wilcox	3:30.42
2nd place, silver medalist(s)	Sweden	1) Magnus Nilsson 2) Peter Wallin; 3) Mats Holmberg 4) Mattias Sunneborn	3:31.09
3rd place, bronze medalist(s)	Spain	1) Gregorio Martínez 2) Carlos García García; 3) José Marcos Valladares Goya 4) Juan Luis López Anaya	3:31.27

==== M50 4x400 metres relay ====
11 teams, 2 heats timed final

Pos	Country	Members/Age	Heat	Result
1st place, gold medalist(s)	Australia	1) Rob Italia 2) Craig Sanford; 3) Gary Parkinson 4) Paul Hughes	2	3:37.78
2nd place, silver medalist(s)	United States	1) John Cormier 2) John Curtis; 3) Charles Novak 4) Lee Bridges	1	3:40.97
3rd place, bronze medalist(s)	Great Britain	1) Gary Clare 2) Mark White; 3) Glenn Gray 4) Michael Gardiner	2	3:42.27

==== M55 4x400 metres relay ====
9 teams

Pos	Country	Members/Age	Result
1st place, gold medalist(s)	Great Britain	1) John Wright 2) Simon Bickers; 3) Kermitt Bentham 4) Jonathan Tilt	3:42.42
2nd place, silver medalist(s)	United States	1) Don McGee 2) William Yelverton; 3) Robert Foster 4) Marcus Shute	3:51.31
3rd place, bronze medalist(s)	Australia	1) Darren Hughes 2) Todd Devery; 3) Allan Cook 4) Colin Smith	3:51.94

==== M60 4x400 metres relay ====
10 teams, 2 heats timed final, all medalists came from heat 1

Pos	Country	Members/Age	Result
1st place, gold medalist(s)	Australia	1) Rob Mayston 2) Andrew Watts; 3) Campbell Till 4) Trevor Young	3:57.37
2nd place, silver medalist(s)	Germany	1) Roland Eberle 2) Wolfgang Kreemke; 3) Andreas Weise 4) Gerhard Zorn	3:59.48
3rd place, bronze medalist(s)	United States	1) Val Barnwell 2) Stephen Gould; 3) Kenneth Thomas 4) Ben James	4:06.28

==== M65 4x400 metres relay ====
7 teams

Pos	Country	Members/Age	Result
1st place, gold medalist(s)	United States	1) David Ortman 2) Charles Allie; 3) Howard Clark 4) George Haywood	4:04.78
2nd place, silver medalist(s)	Germany	1) Gert Brenner 2) Anton Schreiner; 3) Zygmunt Bogdan 4) Karl Dorschner	4:18.44
3rd place, bronze medalist(s)	Great Britain	1) Walwyn Franklyn 2) Simon Barrett; 3) Adrian Essex 4) Stephen Peters	4:30.42

==== M70 4x400 metres relay ====
6 teams

Pos	Country	Members/Age	Result
1st place, gold medalist(s)	Japan	1) Chuji Ogawa 2) Yoshio Aiba; 3) Yasuro Narumi 4) Masahiko Yamasaki	4:45.85
2nd place, silver medalist(s)	Germany	1) Jurgen Hacker 2) Alfred Hermes; 3) Friedhelm Adorf 4) Guenter Hartung	4:57.49
3rd place, bronze medalist(s)	Spain	1) Isidro Ramos 2) Juan Colmenarejo; 3) Ángel Gómez 4) José Luis Romero	5:01.10

==== M75 4x400 metres relay ====
6 teams

Pos	Country	Members/Age	Result
1st place, gold medalist(s)	Germany	1) Heinz Keck 2) Willi Klaus; 3) Guido Mueller 4) Karl Jakob	5:21.99
2nd place, silver medalist(s)	Australia	1) Michael Stevenson 2) Pio Bunin; 3) Robert Schickert 4) Barrie Kernaghan	5:50.20
3rd place, bronze medalist(s)	Great Britain	1) Victor Shirley 2) Arthur Kimber; 3) Barrie Roberts 4) Phil Brennan	5:57.57

==== M80 4x400 metres relay ====
5 teams

Pos	Country	Members/Age	Result
1st place, gold medalist(s)	Spain	1) Josep Sitja Aguyé 2) Angel Cano; 3) Manuel Alonso Domingo 4) Ignacio Martínez De Antonana	5:53.56
2nd place, silver medalist(s)	Japan	1) Muneyoshi Ono 2) Kiyoshi Konoike; 3) Ryosuke Takahara 4) Hiroo Tanaka	6:09.35
3rd place, bronze medalist(s)	Germany	1) Karl Krahn 2) Gerhard Klauder; 3) Klemens Wittig 4) Herbert E. Muller	6:30.72

==== M85 4x400 metres relay ====
2 teams

Pos	Country	Members/Age	Result
1st place, gold medalist(s)	China	1) Bingxiang Fei 2) Fucheng Qiu; 3) Guiben Sun 4) Yide Shi	7:50.66

=== High Jump ===
==== M35 High Jump ====
September 9, 2018

Pos	Athlete	Birthdate	Country	Result
1st place, gold medalist(s)	Lysvanys Arlis Pérez Rodríguez	24-Jan-1982	Spain	2.02 m (6 ft 7 1/2 in)
2nd place, silver medalist(s)	Richard White		United States	1.99 m (6 ft 6 1/4 in)
3rd place, bronze medalist(s)	Miquel Vélez Martin	28-Feb-1983	Spain	1.93 m (6 ft 3 3/4 in)
3rd place, bronze medalist(s)	Sebastian Widjeskog	12-Jun-1981	Finland	1.93 m (6 ft 3 3/4 in)

==== M40 High Jump ====
September 10, 2018, 16 athletes

Pos	Athlete	Birthdate	Country	Result
1st place, gold medalist(s)	Ola Jorgen Karlsson	13-May-1975	Sweden	2.02 m (6 ft 7 1/2 in)
2nd place, silver medalist(s)	Nils Portemer	28-May-1975	Norway	1.99 m (6 ft 6 1/4 in)
3rd place, bronze medalist(s)	Mika Polku	19-Jul-1975	Finland	1.96 m (6 ft 5 in)

==== M45 High Jump ====
September 10, 2018, 22 athletes

Pos	Athlete	Birthdate	Country	Result
1st place, gold medalist(s)	Yoshihisa Fukumoto	02-Sep-1973	Japan	1.91 m (6 ft 3 in)
2nd place, silver medalist(s)	Gintaras Varanauskas	17-Apr-1972	Lithuania	1.85 m (6 ft 3/4 in)
3rd place, bronze medalist(s)	Marco De Angelis	29-Sep-1971	Italy	1.80 m (5 ft 10 3/4 in)

==== M50 High Jump ====
September 10, 2018, 35 athletes, 2 flights. All medalists come from flight 2.

Pos	Athlete	Birthdate	Country	Result
1st place, gold medalist(s)	Adam Young	02-Sep-1968	Great Britain	1.81 m (5 ft 11 1/4 in)
2nd place, silver medalist(s)	Ugis Lasmanis	29-Jul-1967	Latvia	1.81 m (5 ft 11 1/4 in)
3rd place, bronze medalist(s)	José Escalera	03-Sep-1967	Puerto Rico	1.75 m (5 ft 8 3/4 in)
3rd place, bronze medalist(s)	Mark Byron	..-..-1965	Great Britain	1.75 m (5 ft 8 3/4 in)

==== M55 High Jump ====
September 10, 2018, 32 athletes, 2 flights. All medalists come from flight 2.

Pos	Athlete	Birthdate	Country	Result
1st place, gold medalist(s)	Marco Segatel	23-Mar-1962	Italy	1.81 m (5 ft 11 1/4 in)
2nd place, silver medalist(s)	Ruediger Weber	19-Jun-1963	Germany	1.75 m (5 ft 8 3/4 in)
3rd place, bronze medalist(s)	Damon Blakemore	26-Mar-1962	United States	1.75 m (5 ft 8 3/4 in)

==== M60 High Jump ====
September 9, 2018, 17 athletes

Pos	Athlete	Birthdate	Country	Result
1st place, gold medalist(s)	Peter Hlavin	07-Jan-1958	United States	1.68 m (5 ft 6 in)
2nd place, silver medalist(s)	Marc Flohr	..-..-1958	Luxembourg	1.65 m (5 ft 4 3/4 in)
2nd place, silver medalist(s)	Hubert Indra	24-Mar-1957	Italy	1.65 m (5 ft 4 3/4 in)

==== M65 High Jump ====
September 9, 2018, 23 athletes, 2 flights. All medalists come from flight 2.

Pos	Athlete	Birthdate	Country	Result
1st place, gold medalist(s)	Ulf Tudem	25-Sep-1951	Norway	1.57 m (5 ft 1 3/4 in)
2nd place, silver medalist(s)	Matti Nieminen	27-Feb-1962	Finland	1.54 m (5 ft 1/2 in)
3rd place, bronze medalist(s)	Ari Aartola	07-Aug-1952	Finland	1.51 m (4 ft 11 1/4 in)

==== M70 High Jump ====
September 9, 2018, 13 athletes

Pos	Athlete	Birthdate	Country	Result
1st place, gold medalist(s)	Gerhard Wenzke	31-May-1948	Germany	1.51 m (4 ft 11 1/4 in)
2nd place, silver medalist(s)	Valdis Cela	01-Feb-1948	Latvia	1.51 m (4 ft 11 1/4 in)
3rd place, bronze medalist(s)	David Montieth	31-Aug-1945	United States	1.45 m (4 ft 9 in)

==== M75 High Jump ====
September 9, 2018, 18 athletes

Pos	Athlete	Birthdate	Country	Result
1st place, gold medalist(s)	Lamberto Boranga	30-Oct-1942	Italy	1.38 m (4 ft 6 1/4 in)
2nd place, silver medalist(s)	Curtis Morgan	18-Sep-1942	United States	1.33 m (4 ft 4 1/4 in)
3rd place, bronze medalist(s)	Manuel García Carbajo	26-Feb-1943	Spain	1.33 m (4 ft 4 1/4 in)

==== M80 High Jump ====
September 9, 2018, 13 athletes.

Pos	Athlete	Birthdate	Country	Result
1st place, gold medalist(s)	Hans Miekautsch	27-Dec-1937	Austria	1.19 m (3 ft 10 3/4 in)
2nd place, silver medalist(s)	Ioannis Bellos	08-Dec-1936	Greece	1.16 m (3 ft 9 1/2 in)
3rd place, bronze medalist(s)	Kvetoslav Vykydal	04-Apr-1936	Czech Republic	1.16 m (3 ft 9 1/2 in)

==== M85 High Jump ====
September 9, 2018, 12 athletes.

Pos	Athlete	Birthdate	Country	Result
1st place, gold medalist(s)	Helmut Bruning	02-Jul-1933	Germany	1.12 m (3 ft 8 in)
2nd place, silver medalist(s)	Ted Rowan	23-Jul-1933	Canada	1.08 m (3 ft 6 1/2 in)
3rd place, bronze medalist(s)	Raimo Kietavainen	30-May-1931	Finland	1.04 m (3 ft 4 3/4 in)

==== M90 High Jump ====
September 9, 2018

Pos	Athlete	Birthdate	Country	Result
1st place, gold medalist(s)	Pengxue Su	24-Aug-1927	China	0.86 m (2 ft 9 3/4 in)
2nd place, silver medalist(s)	Rad Leovic	29-Aug-1927	Australia	0.71 m (2 ft 3 3/4 in)
3rd place, bronze medalist(s)	István Kovács	15-Nov-1927	Hungary	0.71 m (2 ft 3 3/4 in)

=== Pole Vault ===
==== M35 Pole Vault ====
September 11, 2018, 8 athletes

Pos	Athlete	Birthdate	Country	Result
1st place, gold medalist(s)	Stephane Diaz	24-Dec-1978	France	4.75 m (15 ft 7 in)
2nd place, silver medalist(s)	Jonathan Pérez	23-Jun-1981	Spain	4.65 m (15 ft 3 in)
3rd place, bronze medalist(s)	Pascal Couturier	24-Feb-1979	France	4.55 m (14 ft 11 in)

==== M40 Pole Vault ====
September 11, 2018, 14 athletes

Pos	Athlete	Birthdate	Country	Result
1st place, gold medalist(s)	Gaspar Mateu Carceller	04-Aug-1977	Spain	4.60 m (15 ft 1 in)
2nd place, silver medalist(s)	Chris Mills	12-Nov-1975	Great Britain	4.30 m (14 ft 1 1/4 in)
3rd place, bronze medalist(s)	Jaume Martí Coll	25-Aug-1975	Spain	4.30 m (14 ft 1 1/4 in)

==== M45 Pole Vault ====
September 11, 2018, 16 athletes

Pos	Athlete	Birthdate	Country	Result
1st place, gold medalist(s)	Jonas Asplund	14-Feb-1973	Sweden	4.66 m (15 ft 3 1/4 in)
2nd place, silver medalist(s)	Gianpaolo Bolondi	25-Jan-1970	Italy	4.20 m (13 ft 9 1/4 in)
3rd place, bronze medalist(s)	Carlos Teruel Ortiz	19-Mar-1969	Spain	3.90 m (12 ft 9 1/2 in)

==== M50 Pole Vault ====
September 11, 2018, 16 athletes

Pos	Athlete	Birthdate	Country	Result
1st place, gold medalist(s)	Francisco Javier Hernández	15-Dec-1964	Spain	4.25 m (13 ft 11 1/4 in)
1st place, gold medalist(s)	Mark Johnson	07-Sep-1964	Great Britain	4.25 m (13 ft 11 1/4 in)
3rd place, bronze medalist(s)	Emerson Obiena	04-Nov-1964	Philippines	4.05 m (13 ft 3 1/4 in)

==== M55 Pole Vault ====
September 12, 2018, 18 athletes

Pos	Athlete	Birthdate	Country	Result
1st place, gold medalist(s)	Dolf Berle	11-Mar-1963	United States	3.80 m (12 ft 5 1/2 in)
2nd place, silver medalist(s)	Marc Spony	18-Mar-1961	France	3.70 m (12 ft 1 1/2 in)
3rd place, bronze medalist(s)	Jean-Jacques Michel	23-Mar-1963	France	3.55 m (11 ft 7 3/4 in)
3rd place, bronze medalist(s)	William Nesbitt	31-Oct-1961	United States	3.55 m (11 ft 7 3/4 in)

==== M60 Pole Vault ====
September 12, 2018, 13 athletes

Pos	Athlete	Birthdate	Country	Result
1st place, gold medalist(s)	Wendell Beck	30-Jul-1958	United States	3.60 m (11 ft 9 1/2 in)
2nd place, silver medalist(s)	Kenneth Thomas	03-Mar-1957	United States	3.50 m (11 ft 5 3/4 in)
3rd place, bronze medalist(s)	Hubert Indra	24-Mar-1957	Italy	3.40 m (11 ft 1 3/4 in)

==== M65 Pole Vault ====
September 11, 2018, 17 athletes

Pos	Athlete	Birthdate	Country	Result
1st place, gold medalist(s)	Wolfgang Ritte	07-Jan-1953	Germany	3.90 m (12 ft 9 1/2 in)
2nd place, silver medalist(s)	Ivo Strnad	30-Mar-1951	Czech Republic	3.40 m (11 ft 1 3/4 in)
3rd place, bronze medalist(s)	Kristjan Gissurarson	06-Jun-1953	Iceland	3.30 m (10 ft 9 3/4 in)

==== M70 Pole Vault ====
September 12, 2018, 12 athletes

Pos	Athlete	Birthdate	Country	Result
1st place, gold medalist(s)	Jean-Michel De Senneville	..-..-1948	Mauritius	3.00 m (9 ft 10 in)
2nd place, silver medalist(s)	Valdis Cela	01-Feb-1948	Latvia	3.00 m (9 ft 10 in)
3rd place, bronze medalist(s)	Geoff Shaw	05-Feb-1948	Australia	2.90 m (9 ft 6 in)

==== M75 Pole Vault ====
September 12, 2018, 13 athletes

Pos	Athlete	Birthdate	Country	Result
1st place, gold medalist(s)	Ole Kristian Skaug	02-May-1943	Norway	2.70 m (8 ft 10 1/4 in)
2nd place, silver medalist(s)	Walter Zbinden	18-Nov-1941	Switzerland	2.60 m (8 ft 6 1/4 in)
3rd place, bronze medalist(s)	Hans Ture Lennart Lagerqvist	28-Apr-1940	Sweden	2.50 m (8 ft 2 1/4 in)

==== M80 Pole Vault ====
September 12, 2018, 9 athletes

Pos	Athlete	Birthdate	Country	Result
1st place, gold medalist(s)	Knut Henrik Skramstad	10-Jan-1937	Norway	2.40 m (7 ft 10 1/4 in)
2nd place, silver medalist(s)	Paulus Makkonen	30-Sep-1937	Finland	2.25 m (7 ft 4 1/2 in)
3rd place, bronze medalist(s)	Raul Lopez Barrera	16-Jul-1934	Uruguay	2.00 m (6 ft 6 1/2 in)

==== M85 Pole Vault ====
September 12, 2018, 6 athletes

Pos	Athlete	Birthdate	Country	Result
1st place, gold medalist(s)	Robert Arledge	24-Jun-1933	United States	1.70 m (5 ft 6 3/4 in)
2nd place, silver medalist(s)	Ake Lund	08-Oct-1930	Finland	1.40 m (4 ft 7 in)
3rd place, bronze medalist(s)	Jerry Donley	17-Feb-1930	United States	1.30 m (4 ft 3 in)

=== Long Jump ===
==== M35 Long Jump ====
24 athletes. Two flights and final on September 10, 2018

Pos	Athlete	Birthdate	Country	Result Wind
1st place, gold medalist(s)	Morten Jensen	02-Dec-1982	Denmark	6.78 m (22 ft 2 3/4 in) +0.3
2nd place, silver medalist(s)	David Vázquez Blanco	01-Mar-1983	Spain	6.70 m (21 ft 11 3/4 in) +0.5
3rd place, bronze medalist(s)	Imad Benaicha Redouane	22-Jul-1982	France	6.61 m (21 ft 8 in) -0.1

==== M40 Long Jump ====
37 athletes. Two flights and final on September 9, 2018

Pos	Athlete	Birthdate	Country	Result Wind
1st place, gold medalist(s)	James Beckford	09-Jan-1975	Jamaica	6.94 m (22 ft 9 in) -0.3
2nd place, silver medalist(s)	Pierluigi Putzu	13-Nov-1977	Italy	6.56 m (21 ft 6 1/4 in) 0.0
3rd place, bronze medalist(s)	Philip Van der Walt	16-Jul-1976	South Africa	6.44 m (21 ft 1 1/2 in) 0.0

==== M45 Long Jump ====
35 athletes. 2 flights and final on September 9, 2018

Pos	Athlete	Birthdate	Country	Result Wind
1st place, gold medalist(s)	Mattias Sunneborn	27-Sep-1970	Sweden	6.22 m (20 ft 4 3/4 in) +0.0
2nd place, silver medalist(s)	David López Capape	03-May-1973	Spain	6.15 m (20 ft 2 in) +0.0
3rd place, bronze medalist(s)	Alexander Kuhnert	19-Aug-1972	Germany	6.15 m (20 ft 2 in) +1.0

Capape took second based on second best jump, 6.07 (twice) to Kuhnert 6.06

==== M50 Long Jump ====
37 athletes. Two flights and final on September 9, 2018

Pos	Athlete	Birthdate	Country	Result Wind
(gold) IPC	Roberto La Barbera	25-Feb-1967	Italy	6.54 m (21 ft 5 1/4 in) 0.0
1st place, gold medalist(s)	Edson Pessanha Junior	15-Mar-1967	Brazil	6.33 m (20 ft 9 in) +2.0
2nd place, silver medalist(s)	Bruno Dufag	24-Apr-1966	France	6.23 m (20 ft 5 1/4 in) +1.3
3rd place, bronze medalist(s)	Alberto Tifi	14-May-1968	Italy	6.19 m (20 ft 3 1/2 in) +0.8

==== M55 Long Jump ====
31 athletes. Two flights and final on September 9, 2018

Pos	Athlete	Birthdate	Country	Result Wind
1st place, gold medalist(s)	Gianni Becatti	27-Aug-1963	Italy	6.50 m (21 ft 3 3/4 in) 0.0 WR
2nd place, silver medalist(s)	Howard Lindsay	14-Aug-1963	Netherlands Antilles	6.12 m (20 ft 3/4 in) +1.0
3rd place, bronze medalist(s)	Luke De Biasi	28-Jul-1963	Australia	6.03 m (19 ft 9 1/4 in) 0.0

==== M60 Long Jump ====
40 athletes. Two flights and final on September 10, 2018

Pos	Athlete	Birthdate	Country	Result Wind
1st place, gold medalist(s)	Wieslaw Musial	20-Oct-1957	Poland	5.42 m (17 ft 9 1/4 in)w -2.6
2nd place, silver medalist(s)	Anders Olsson	01-Oct-1956	Sweden	5.40 m (17 ft 8 1/2 in) -0.48
3rd place, bronze medalist(s)	Pietro Ligorio	10-Mar-1957	Italy	5.30 m (17 ft 4 1/2 in) -2.2

==== M65 Long Jump ====
September 11, 2018

Pos	Athlete	Birthdate	Country	Result Wind
1st place, gold medalist(s)	Wolfgang Ritte	07-Jan-1953	Germany	5.44 m (17 ft 10 in)w 0.0
2nd place, silver medalist(s)	Adrian Neagu	15-Jun-1953	Romania	5.31 m (17 ft 5 in) 0.0
3rd place, bronze medalist(s)	Jan Tomczak	27-Dec-1952	Poland	5.02 m (16 ft 5 1/2 in) 0.0

==== M70 Long Jump ====
12 athletes. One flight and final on September 10, 2018

Pos	Athlete	Birthdate	Country	Result Wind
1st place, gold medalist(s)	Valdis Cela	01-Feb-1948	Latvia	4.98 m (16 ft 4 in) +2.0
2nd place, silver medalist(s)	Pertti Ahomaki	26-Feb-1946	Finland	4.94 m (16 ft 2 1/4 in) +1.8
3rd place, bronze medalist(s)	Arnoldo Osvaldo Gómez	25-May-1944	Argentina	4.25 m (13 ft 11 1/4 in) +1.5

==== M75 Long Jump ====
21 athletes. One flight and final on September 10, 2018

Pos	Athlete	Birthdate	Country	Result Wind
1st place, gold medalist(s)	Antero Markunsalo	03-Oct-1942	Finland	4.06 m (13 ft 3 3/4 in) 0.0
2nd place, silver medalist(s)	Ole Kristian Skaug	02-May-1943	Norway	3.96 m (12 ft 11 3/4 in) 0.0
3rd place, bronze medalist(s)	Ricardo Pergola Ramirez	21-Nov-1942	Chile	3.93 m (12 ft 10 1/2 in) 0.0

==== M80 Long Jump ====
20 athletes on September 11, 2018

Pos	Athlete	Birthdate	Country	Result Wind
1st place, gold medalist(s)	Karl Schmid	09-Jan-1938	Germany	3.78 m (12 ft 4 3/4 in) -1.3
2nd place, silver medalist(s)	Francisco Morrongiello	31-Jan-1938	Argentina	3.70 m (12 ft 1 1/2 in) -0.8
3rd place, bronze medalist(s)	Adolf Appel	28-Jun-1938	Germany	3.62 m (11 ft 10 1/2 in) -1.0

==== M85 Long Jump ====
13 athletes on September 11, 2018

Pos	Athlete	Birthdate	Country	Result Wind
1st place, gold medalist(s)	Henri Lenoir	09-Jun-1932	Belgium	3.27 m (10 ft 8 1/2 in) 0.0
2nd place, silver medalist(s)	Ted Rowan	23-Jul-1933	Canada	3.25 m (10 ft 7 3/4 in) +0.1
3rd place, bronze medalist(s)	Mario Cesar Calderon	25-Jul-1931	Guatemala	2.78 m (9 ft 1 1/4 in) +1.9

==== M90 Long Jump ====
September 11, 2018

Pos	Athlete	Birthdate	Country	Result
1st place, gold medalist(s)	Yoshiyuki Shimizu	14-Jul-1928	Brazil	3.25 m (10 ft 7 3/4 in) +0.1
2nd place, silver medalist(s)	Pengxue Su	24-Aug-1927	China	1.91 m (6 ft 3 in) 0.0

==== M100 Long Jump ====
September 11, 2018

Pos	Athlete	Birthdate	Country	Result
1st place, gold medalist(s)	Giuseppe Ottaviani	20-May-1916	Italy	.83 m (2 ft 8 1/2 in) +0.3

=== Triple Jump ===
==== M35 Triple Jump ====
10 athletes. One flight and final on September 15, 2018

Pos	Athlete	Birthdate	Country	Result Wind
1st place, gold medalist(s)	Lysvanys Arlis Pérez Rodríguez	24-Jan-1982	Spain	14.86 m (48 ft 9 in) +0.0
2nd place, silver medalist(s)	Andreas Beraz	18-Jun-1979	Germany	14.17 m (46 ft 5 3/4 in) -0.3
3rd place, bronze medalist(s)	Lennart Teunissen	19-Jun-1981	Netherlands	13.91 m (45 ft 7 1/2 in) -0.8

==== M40 Triple Jump ====
21 athletes. One flight and final on September 15, 2018

Pos	Athlete	Birthdate	Country	Result Wind
1st place, gold medalist(s)	Samuel Okantey	03-Nov-1974	Ghana	14.30 m (46 ft 10 3/4 in) +1.5
2nd place, silver medalist(s)	Nils Portemer	28-May-1975	France	13.59 m (44 ft 7 in) +1.6
3rd place, bronze medalist(s)	Alexander Leprich	15-Feb-1975	Austria	13.51 m (44 ft 3 3/4 in) -1.0

==== M45 Triple Jump ====
28 athletes. 2 flights and final on September 15, 2018

Pos	Athlete	Birthdate	Country	Result Wind
1st place, gold medalist(s)	Mattias Sunneborn	27-Sep-1970	Sweden	13.44 m (44 ft 1 in) +0.0
2nd place, silver medalist(s)	Marek Volf	03-Aug-1973	Czech Republic	13.41 m (43 ft 11 3/4 in) +0.1
3rd place, bronze medalist(s)	Mario Quintero Estrada	29-Sep-1970	Spain	13.34 m (43 ft 9 in) +0.2

==== M50 Triple Jump ====
20 athletes. One flight and final on September 15, 2018

Pos	Athlete	Birthdate	Country	Result Wind
1st place, gold medalist(s)	José Escalera	03-Sep-1967	Puerto Rico	13.35 m (43 ft 9 1/2 in) +2.0
2nd place, silver medalist(s)	Bruno Dufag	24-Apr-1966	France	12.98 m (42 ft 7 in) +0.7
3rd place, bronze medalist(s)	Michele Tico'	27-May-1965	Italy	12.86 m (42 ft 2 1/4 in) +1.2

==== M55 Triple Jump ====
28 athletes. Two flights and final on September 15, 2018

Pos	Athlete	Birthdate	Country	Result Wind
1st place, gold medalist(s)	Hideharu Aoki	13-Apr-1962	Japan	12.54 m (41 ft 1 1/2 in) -1.4
2nd place, silver medalist(s)	Alfred Stummer	23-Aug-1962	Austria	12.37 m (40 ft 7 in) -0.7
3rd place, bronze medalist(s)	Peter Lord	13-Aug-1963	Canada	11.72 m (38 ft 5 1/4 in) -2.0

==== M60 Triple Jump ====
22 athletes. One flight and final on September 15, 2018

Pos	Athlete	Birthdate	Country	Result Wind
1st place, gold medalist(s)	Wieslaw Musial	20-Oct-1957	Poland	11.46 m (37 ft 7 in)w -0.2
2nd place, silver medalist(s)	Stein Tore Klungland	02-Aug-1958	Norway	11.38 m (37 ft 4 in) +1.1
3rd place, bronze medalist(s)	Massimo Fiorini	17-Jun-1958	Italy	11.06 m (36 ft 3 1/4 in) 0.0

==== M65 Triple Jump ====
19 athletes. One flight and final on September 15, 2018

Pos	Athlete	Birthdate	Country	Result Wind
1st place, gold medalist(s)	Crescenzio Marchetti	24-Mar-1951	Italy	11.13 m (36 ft 6 in) +1.5
2nd place, silver medalist(s)	Ignazio Manfre'	12-Mar-1953	Italy	10.73 m (35 ft 2 1/4 in) +1.4
3rd place, bronze medalist(s)	Slawomir Drag	03-Aug-1951	Poland	10.66 m (34 ft 11 1/2 in) +1.0

==== M70 Triple Jump ====
14 athletes. One flight and final on September 12, 2018

Pos	Athlete	Birthdate	Country	Result Wind
1st place, gold medalist(s)	Valdis Cela	01-Feb-1948	Latvia	10.35 m (33 ft 11 1/4 in) 0.0
2nd place, silver medalist(s)	Pertti Ahomaki	26-Feb-1946	Finland	9.69 m (31 ft 9 1/4 in) +0.8
3rd place, bronze medalist(s)	Geoff Shaw	05-Feb-1948	Australia	9.52 m (31 ft 2 3/4 in) +0.8

==== M75 Triple Jump ====
15 athletes. One flight and final on September 12, 2018

Pos	Athlete	Birthdate	Country	Result Wind
1st place, gold medalist(s)	Koji Nakamura	18-Aug-1942	Japan	8.97 m (29 ft 5 in) +1.9
2nd place, silver medalist(s)	Janis Mankovskis	10-Jan-1940	Latvia	8.65 m (28 ft 4 1/2 in) +1.6
3rd place, bronze medalist(s)	Hiromu Shimizu	16-Feb-1941	Brazil	8.54 m (28 ft 0 in) +1.6

==== M80 Triple Jump ====
11 athletes on September 12, 2018

Pos	Athlete	Birthdate	Country	Result Wind
1st place, gold medalist(s)	Adolf Appel	28-Jun-1938	Germany	7.65 m (25 ft 1 in) -2.6
2nd place, silver medalist(s)	Karl-Heinz Nitschke	05-Dec-1937	Germany	7.47 m (24 ft 6 in) -1.3
3rd place, bronze medalist(s)	John Arve Johansen	01-Apr-1936	Norway	7.46 m (24 ft 5 1/2 in) -3.4

==== M85 Triple Jump ====
9 athletes on September 12, 2018

Pos	Athlete	Birthdate	Country	Result Wind
1st place, gold medalist(s)	Ted Rowan	23-Jul-1933	Canada	6.37 m (20 ft 10 3/4 in) -1.6
2nd place, silver medalist(s)	Mario Cesar Calderón	25-Jul-1931	Guatemala	5.90 m (19 ft 4 1/4 in) -1.8
3rd place, bronze medalist(s)	Hardev Singh	10-Jan-1932	India	2.78 m (9 ft 1 1/4 in) -1.9

==== M90 Triple Jump ====
September 12, 2018

Pos	Athlete	Birthdate	Country	Result
1st place, gold medalist(s)	Yoshiyuki Shimizu	14-Jul-1928	Brazil	6.98 m (22 ft 10 3/4 in) -1.4
2nd place, silver medalist(s)	Pengxue Su	24-Aug-1927	China	4.11 m (13 ft 5 3/4 in) -1.3
3rd place, bronze medalist(s)	István Kovács	15-Nov-1927	Hungary	2.79 m (9 ft 1 3/4 in) -1.8

==== M100 Triple Jump ====
September 12, 2018

Pos	Athlete	Birthdate	Country	Result
1st place, gold medalist(s)	Giuseppe Ottaviani	20-May-1916	Italy	2.23 m (7 ft 3 3/4 in) +0.0

=== Shot Put ===
==== M35 Shot Put ====
20 athletes, 1 flight and final held on September 6, 2018

Pos	Athlete	Birthdate	Country	Result
1st place, gold medalist(s)	Genro Paas	05-May-1979	Estonia	16.25 m (53 ft 3 3/4 in)
2nd place, silver medalist(s)	Dominik Lewin	13-Jun-1980	Germany	16.13 m (52 ft 11 in)
3rd place, bronze medalist(s)	Zdenek Cejnar	29-Jun-1982	Czech Republic	15.98 m (52 ft 5 in)

==== M40 Shot Put ====
September 6, 2018

Pos	Athlete	Birthdate	Country	Result
1st place, gold medalist(s)	Andy Dittmar	05-Jul-1974	Germany	17.72 m (58 ft 1 1/2 in)
2nd place, silver medalist(s)	Petros Mitsides	12-Dec-1977	Cyprus	14.65 m (48 ft 3/4 in)
3rd place, bronze medalist(s)	Stephen McCauley	06-Feb-1974	Great Britain	14.40 m (47 ft 2 3/4 in)

==== M45 Shot Put ====
20 athletes, 1 flight and final held on September 6, 2018

Pos	Athlete	Birthdate	Country	Result
1st place, gold medalist(s)	Gerhard Zillner	22-Feb-1971	Austria	15.16 m (49 ft 8 3/4 in)
2nd place, silver medalist(s)	Ralf Mordhorst	11-May-1973	Germany	14.94 m (49 ft 0 in)
3rd place, bronze medalist(s)	Niels Depner	..-..-1973	Germany	14.28 m (46 ft 10 in)

==== M50 Shot Put ====
32 athletes, 2 flights and final held on September 6, 2018

Pos	Athlete	Birthdate	Country	Result
1st place, gold medalist(s)	Gabriel Pedroso	12-Jan-1968	Spain	16.28 m (53 ft 4 3/4 in)
2nd place, silver medalist(s)	Andreas Deuschle	11-Feb-1968	Germany	15.54 m (50 ft 11 3/4 in)
3rd place, bronze medalist(s)	Iwan Kees Groothuijse	29-Apr-1967	Netherlands	15.26 m (50 ft 3/4 in)

==== M55 Shot Put ====
25 athletes, 2 flights and final held on September 6, 2018

Pos	Athlete	Birthdate	Country	Result
1st place, gold medalist(s)	James Patterson	..-May-1963	United States	16.14 m (52 ft 11 1/4 in)
2nd place, silver medalist(s)	Norbert Demmel	10-May-1963	Germany	15.23 m (49 ft 11 1/2 in)
3rd place, bronze medalist(s)	Victor DeMarines	23-Mar-1963	United States	15.11 m (49 ft 6 3/4 in)

==== M60 Shot Put ====
26 athletes, 2 flights and final held on September 5, 2018

Pos	Athlete	Birthdate	Country	Result
1st place, gold medalist(s)	Karri Westerlund	25-Jul-1957	Finland	15.66 m (51 ft 4 1/2 in)
2nd place, silver medalist(s)	Gregory Holden	29-Mar-1958	United States	14.97 m (49 ft 1 1/4 in)
3rd place, bronze medalist(s)	Vasileios Manganas	07-May-1954	Greece	14.11 m (46 ft 3 1/2 in)

==== M65 Shot Put ====
September 4, 2018

Pos	Athlete	Birthdate	Country	Result
1st place, gold medalist(s)	Quenton Torbert	02-Dec-1951	United States	15.23 m (49 ft 11 1/2 in)
2nd place, silver medalist(s)	Joseph Myers	10-Jun-1952	United States	13.97 m (45 ft 10 in)
3rd place, bronze medalist(s)	Timothy Muller	04-Mar-1950	United States	12.94 m (42 ft 5 1/4 in)

==== M70 Shot Put ====
September 4, 2018

Pos	Athlete	Birthdate	Country	Result
1st place, gold medalist(s)	Arild Busterud	26-Jan-1948	Norway	14.03 m (46 ft 1/4 in)
2nd place, silver medalist(s)	Wieslaw Tobiasz	03-Jun-1948	Poland	13.49 m (44 ft 3 in)
3rd place, bronze medalist(s)	William Harvey	04-Dec-1945	United States	13.32 m (43 ft 8 1/4 in)

==== M75 Shot Put ====
September 4, 2018

Pos	Athlete	Birthdate	Country	Result
1st place, gold medalist(s)	Roland Heiler	20-Dec-1938	Germany	12.72 m (41 ft 8 3/4 in)
2nd place, silver medalist(s)	Marek Glowacki	07-Sep-1940	Canada	11.65 m (38 ft 2 1/2 in)
3rd place, bronze medalist(s)	Claude Letourneur	11-10-1942	France	11.46 m (37 ft 7 in)

==== M80 Shot Put ====
September 4, 2018

Pos	Athlete	Birthdate	Country	Result
1st place, gold medalist(s)	Lothar Huchthausen	13-Mar-1935	Germany	12.33 m (40 ft 5 1/4 in)
2nd place, silver medalist(s)	Östen Edlund	26-Nov-1934	Sweden	12.29 m (40 ft 3 3/4 in)
3rd place, bronze medalist(s)	Herbert Raml	26-Aug-1938	Germany	11.65 m (38 ft 2 1/2 in)

==== M85 Shot Put ====
September 4, 2018

Pos	Athlete	Birthdate	Country	Result
1st place, gold medalist(s)	Petrus Verdonck	01-Oct-1932	Belgium	10.64 m (34 ft 10 3/4 in)
2nd place, silver medalist(s)	Wendelin Acker	03-Jun-1933	Germany	10.03 m (32 ft 10 3/4 in)
3rd place, bronze medalist(s)	Anton Laus	25-May-1933	Estonia	9.90 m (32 ft 5 3/4 in)

==== M90 Shot Put ====
September 4, 2018

Pos	Athlete	Birthdate	Country	Result
1st place, gold medalist(s)	Rene Turpin	25-Mar-1927	France	7.30 m (23 ft 11 1/4 in)
2nd place, silver medalist(s)	Lauri Helle	01-May-1925	Finland	6.68 m (21 ft 10 3/4 in)
3rd place, bronze medalist(s)	Bingxiang Fei	08-Dec-1927	China	5.91 m (19 ft 4 1/2 in)

=== Discus Throw ===
==== M35 Discus Throw ====
25 athletes, 2 flights and final held on September 9, 2018

Pos	Athlete	Birthdate	Country	Result
1st place, gold medalist(s)	Lois Maikel Martinez	03-Jun-1981	Spain	56.65 m (185 ft 10 in)
2nd place, silver medalist(s)	Filipe Silva	27-Jan-1983	Portugal	54.42 m (178 ft 6 in)
3rd place, bronze medalist(s)	Pedro José Cuesta Fernández	22-Aug-1983	Spain	53.37 m (175 ft 1 in)

==== M40 Discus Throw ====
16 athletes, 1 flight and final September 9, 2018

Pos	Athlete	Birthdate	Country	Result
1st place, gold medalist(s)	James Dennis	25-Feb-1976	United States	50.66 m (166 ft 2 in)
2nd place, silver medalist(s)	Bjorn Terje Pay	05-Mar-1974	Norway	49.23 m (161 ft 6 in)
3rd place, bronze medalist(s)	Filip Peetrain	10-Aug-1974	Belgium	48.33 m (158 ft 6 in)

==== M45 Discus Throw ====
25 athletes, 2 flights and final held on September 9, 2018

Pos	Athlete	Birthdate	Country	Result
1st place, gold medalist(s)	Ralf Mordhorst	11-May-1973	Germany	50.47 m (165 ft 7 in)
2nd place, silver medalist(s)	Jan Swanepoel	07-Apr-1971	South Africa	48.93 m (160 ft 6 in)
3rd place, bronze medalist(s)	Michael Glenn Conjungo Taumhas	06-May-1969	France	45.86 m (150 ft 5 in)

==== M50 Discus Throw ====
32 athletes, 2 flights and final held on September 9, 2018

Pos	Athlete	Birthdate	Country	Result
1st place, gold medalist(s)	Gabriel Pedroso	12-Jan-1968	Spain	58.63 m (192 ft 4 in)
2nd place, silver medalist(s)	Helmut Maryniak	14-Jun-1968	Germany	55.60 m (182 ft 4 in)
3rd place, bronze medalist(s)	Otto Benczenleitner	24-Nov-1966	Hungary	55.30 m (181 ft 5 in)

==== M55 Discus Throw ====
37 athletes, 2 flights and final held on September 9, 2018

Pos	Athlete	Birthdate	Country	Result
1st place, gold medalist(s)	Norbert Demmel	10-May-1963	Germany	53.27 m (174 ft 9 in)
2nd place, silver medalist(s)	Victor DeMarines	23-Mar-1963	United States	50.06 m (164 ft 2 in)
3rd place, bronze medalist(s)	Tom Jensen	29-Jan-1960	Denmark	48.06 m (157 ft 8 in)

==== M60 Discus Throw ====
47 athletes, 2 flights and final held on September 9, 2018

Pos	Athlete	Birthdate	Country	Result
1st place, gold medalist(s)	Giovanni Rastelli	14-Jan-1954	Italy	50.79 m (166 ft 7 in)*
2nd place, silver medalist(s)	Karel Hosek	04-Apr-1958	Czech Republic	50.79 m (166 ft 7 in)*
3rd place, bronze medalist(s)	Jiri Solar	13-Jun-1954	Czech Republic	49.72 m (163 ft 1 in)

- Hosek equalled Rastelli's 3rd round throw of 50.79 on his final attempt. The tiebreaker was Rastelli's 2nd best throw of 50.52, to Hosek's 47.51

==== M65 Discus Throw ====
37 athletes, 2 flights and final held on September 7, 2018

Pos	Athlete	Birthdate	Country	Result
1st place, gold medalist(s)	Guy Dirkin	31-Dec-1952	Great Britain	46.66 m (153 ft 1 in)
2nd place, silver medalist(s)	Milos Gryc	07-May-1949	Czech Republic	45.71 m (149 ft 11 in)
3rd place, bronze medalist(s)	Timothy Muller	04-Mar-1950	United States	43.56 m (142 ft 10 in)

==== M70 Discus Throw ====
28 athletes, 2 flights and final held on September 7, 2018

Pos	Athlete	Birthdate	Country	Result
1st place, gold medalist(s)	Julio Calvo Redondo	04-Mar-1944	Spain	46.34 m (152 ft 0 in)
2nd place, silver medalist(s)	Arild Busterud	26-Jan-1948	Norway	44.41 m (145 ft 8 in)
3rd place, bronze medalist(s)	Leszek Bobrzyk	20-Feb-1948	Poland	42.84 m (140 ft 6 in)

==== M75 Discus Throw ====
19 athletes, one flight and final September 7, 2018

Pos	Athlete	Birthdate	Country	Result
1st place, gold medalist(s)	John Watts	23-Apr-1939	Great Britain	39.53 m (129 ft 8 in)
2nd place, silver medalist(s)	Roland Heiler	20-Dec-1938	Germany	38.11 m (125 ft 0 in)
3rd place, bronze medalist(s)	Gunther Fandrich	05-Nov-1941	Germany	36.78 m (120 ft 8 in)

==== M80 Discus Throw ====
16 athletes, one flight and final September 7, 2018

Pos	Athlete	Birthdate	Country	Result
1st place, gold medalist(s)	Östen Edlund	26-Nov-1934	Sweden	36.11 m (118 ft 5 in)
2nd place, silver medalist(s)	Lothar Huchthausen	13-Mar-1935	Germany	30.24 m (99 ft 2 in)
3rd place, bronze medalist(s)	Herbert Raml	26-Aug-1938	Germany	29.30 m (96 ft 1 in)

==== M85 Discus Throw ====
16 athletes, one flight and final September 7, 2018

Pos	Athlete	Birthdate	Country	Result
1st place, gold medalist(s)	Takumi Matsushima	31-May-1932	Brazil	28.02 m (91 ft 11 in)
2nd place, silver medalist(s)	Anton Laus	25-May-1933	Estonia	25.87 m (84 ft 10 in)
3rd place, bronze medalist(s)	Emilio Fernando Galindo D'Andun	08-Apr-1933	Mexico	22.40 m (73 ft 5 in)

==== M90 Discus Throw ====
7 Athletes, one flight and final September 7, 2018

Pos	Athlete	Birthdate	Country	Result
1st place, gold medalist(s)	Lauri Helle	01-May-1925	Finland	15.82 m (51 ft 10 in)
2nd place, silver medalist(s)	Rene Turpin	25-Mar-1927	France	15.81 m (51 ft 10 in)
3rd place, bronze medalist(s)	Bingxiang Fei	08-Dec-1927	China	13.05 m (42 ft 9 in)

=== Hammer Throw ===
==== M35 Hammer throw ====
15 athletes, 1 flight and final held on September 4, 2018

Pos	Athlete	Birthdate	Country	Result
1st place, gold medalist(s)	Ignacio Fernández	07-Jan-1979	Spain	58.50 m (191 ft 11 in)
2nd place, silver medalist(s)	Jiri Koukal	23-Jun-1982	Slovakia	57.33 m (188 ft 1 in)
3rd place, bronze medalist(s)	Genro Paas	05-May-1979	Estonia	56.32 m (184 ft 9 in)

==== M40 Hammer throw ====
17 athletes, 1 flight and final held on September 4, 2018

Pos	Athlete	Birthdate	Country	Result
1st place, gold medalist(s)	Ignacio Calderón Aguado	23-Jun-1976	Spain	58.07 m (190 ft 6 in)
2nd place, silver medalist(s)	Aldo Bello Morillo	23-May-1975	Venezuela	57.57 m (188 ft 10 in)
3rd place, bronze medalist(s)	Peter Kullos	29-Mar-1976	Hungary	56.26 m (184 ft 6 in)

==== M45 Hammer throw ====
12 athletes, 1 flight and final held on September 4, 2018

Pos	Athlete	Birthdate	Country	Result
1st place, gold medalist(s)	Zoltán Fábián	22-Apr-1969	Hungary	65.15 m (213 ft 8 in)
2nd place, silver medalist(s)	Mariusz Walczak	27-Feb-1971	Poland	58.43 m (191 ft 8 in)
3rd place, bronze medalist(s)	Carlos Lafuente Suárez	18-Nov-1971	Spain	53.88 m (176 ft 9 in)

==== M50 Hammer throw ====
25 athletes, 2 flights and final held on September 4, 2018

Pos	Athlete	Birthdate	Country	Result
1st place, gold medalist(s)	Adrián Carlos Marzo	24-Jan-1968	Argentina	62.31 m (204 ft 5 in)
2nd place, silver medalist(s)	Balazs Lezsak	27-May-1965	Hungary	61.02 m (200 ft 2 in)
3rd place, bronze medalist(s)	Jan Cordius	12-Apr-1966	Denmark	57.20 m (187 ft 7 in)

==== M55 Hammer throw ====
26 athletes, 2 flights and final held on September 4, 2018

Pos	Athlete	Birthdate	Country	Result
1st place, gold medalist(s)	Lech Kowalski	17-Jan-1961	Poland	54.33 m (178 ft 2 in)
2nd place, silver medalist(s)	Rimvydas Medisauskas	28-Mar-1962	Lithuania	52.81 m (173 ft 3 in)
3rd place, bronze medalist(s)	Norbert Demmel	10-May-1963	Germany	48.72 m (159 ft 10 in)

==== M60 Hammer throw ====
28 athletes, 2 flights and final held on September 4, 2018

Pos	Athlete	Birthdate	Country	Result
1st place, gold medalist(s)	Gottfried Gassenbauer	17-Aug-1958	Austria	55.00 m (180 ft 5 in)
2nd place, silver medalist(s)	Thierry Despontin	02-Apr-1958	Belgium	52.10 m (170 ft 11 in)
3rd place, bronze medalist(s)	Vasileios Manganas	07-May-1954	Greece	51.66 m (169 ft 5 in)

==== M65 Hammer throw ====
19 athletes, 1 flight and final held on September 4, 2018

Pos	Athlete	Birthdate	Country	Result
1st place, gold medalist(s)	Andrzej Piaczkowski	02-Apr-1950	Poland	45.44 m (149 ft 0 in)
2nd place, silver medalist(s)	Guy Dirkin	31-Dec-1952	Great Britain	45.37 m (148 ft 10 in)
3rd place, bronze medalist(s)	Waclaw Krankowski	19-Jan-1951	Poland	43.78 m (143 ft 7 in)

==== M70 Hammer throw ====
20 athletes, 1 flight and final held on September 4, 2018

Pos	Athlete	Birthdate	Country	Result
1st place, gold medalist(s)	Jerzy Jablonski	23-Apr-1945	Poland	51.92 m (170 ft 4 in)
2nd place, silver medalist(s)	Arild Busterud	26-Jan-1948	Norway	49.69 m (163 ft 0 in)
3rd place, bronze medalist(s)	Gerard Guyot	15-Nov-1944	France	48.09 m (157 ft 9 in)

==== M75 Hammer throw ====
14 athletes, 1 flight and final held on September 6, 2018

Pos	Athlete	Birthdate	Country	Result
1st place, gold medalist(s)	Adi Vidmajer	07-Jan-1942	Slovenia	42.17 m (138 ft 4 in)
2nd place, silver medalist(s)	Gunther Fandrich	05-Nov-1941	Germany	39.50 m (129 ft 7 in)
3rd place, bronze medalist(s)	George Mathews	28-Jul-1943	United States	38.99 m (127 ft 11 in)

==== M80 Hammer throw ====
18 athletes, 1 flight and final held on September 6, 2018

Pos	Athlete	Birthdate	Country	Result
1st place, gold medalist(s)	Jose María Sanza Agreda	01-Apr-1935	Spain	43.07 m (141 ft 3 in)
2nd place, silver medalist(s)	Ajmer Singh	02-Feb-1938	India	42.74 m (140 ft 2 in)
3rd place, bronze medalist(s)	Andrzej Rzepecki	13-Aug-1936	South Africa	42.59 m (139 ft 8 in)

==== M85 Hammer throw ====
15 athletes, 1 flight and final held on September 6, 2018

Pos	Athlete	Birthdate	Country	Result
1st place, gold medalist(s)	Helmut Bruning	02-Jul-1933	Germany	32.83 m (107 ft 8 in)
2nd place, silver medalist(s)	Anton Laus	25-May-1933	Estonia	29.72 m (97 ft 6 in)
3rd place, bronze medalist(s)	Wendelin Acker	03-Jun-1933	Germany	28.04 m (91 ft 11 in)

==== M90 Hammer throw ====
5 athletes, 1 flight and final held on September 6, 2018

Pos	Athlete	Birthdate	Country	Result
1st place, gold medalist(s)	Lauri Helle	01-May-1925	Finland	16.18 m (53 ft 1 in)
2nd place, silver medalist(s)	Rene Turpin	25-Mar-1927	France	15.90 m (52 ft 1 in)
3rd place, bronze medalist(s)	Christian Tittel	28-May-1928	Australia	13.31 m (43 ft 8 in)

=== Javelin Throw ===
==== M35 Javelin Throw ====
18 athletes, 1 flight and final held on September 11, 2018

Pos	Athlete	Birthdate	Country	Result
1st place, gold medalist(s)	Bjorn Lange	15-Jun-1979	Germany	67.21 m (220 ft 6 in)
2nd place, silver medalist(s)	Tero Savolainen	17-Apr-1980	Finland	63.01 m (206 ft 8 in)
3rd place, bronze medalist(s)	Sandris Linbergs	04-Sep-1980	Latvia	60.79 m (199 ft 5 in)

==== M40 Javelin Throw ====
17 athletes, 1 flight and final held on September 11, 2018

Pos	Athlete	Birthdate	Country	Result
1st place, gold medalist(s)	David García Canelada	14-Oct-1977	Spain	61.72 m (202 ft 5 in)
2nd place, silver medalist(s)	Hubert Goeller	28-Jan-1977	Italy	57.90 m (189 ft 11 in)
3rd place, bronze medalist(s)	Anastasios Laoudikos	13-Aug-1977	Greece	54.36 m (178 ft 4 in)

==== M45 Javelin Throw ====
23 athletes, 2 flights and final held on September 11, 2018

Pos	Athlete	Birthdate	Country	Result
1st place, gold medalist(s)	Danilo Fresnido	08-Oct-1972	Philippines	63.11 m (207 ft 0 in)
2nd place, silver medalist(s)	Raymond Hecht	11-Nov-1968	Germany	62.79 m (206 ft 0 in)
3rd place, bronze medalist(s)	Tomasz Damszel	25-Mar-1972	Poland	60.71 m (199 ft 2 in)

==== M50 Javelin Throw ====
41 athletes, 2 flights and final held on September 12, 2018

Pos	Athlete	Birthdate	Country	Result
1st place, gold medalist(s)	Wilhelm Pauer	06-Feb-1967	South Africa	67.87 m (222 ft 8 in)
2nd place, silver medalist(s)	Peter Esenwein	07-Dec-1967	Germany	63.02 m (206 ft 9 in)
3rd place, bronze medalist(s)	Tommi Huotilainen	17-Nov-1967	Finland	61.82 m (202 ft 9 in)

==== M55 Javelin Throw ====
37 athletes, 2 flights and final held on September 12, 2018

Pos	Athlete	Birthdate	Country	Result
1st place, gold medalist(s)	Roald Bradstock	24-Apr-1962	Great Britain	61.72 m (202 ft 5 in)
2nd place, silver medalist(s)	Peter Blank	10-Apr-1962	Germany	61.26 m (200 ft 11 in)
3rd place, bronze medalist(s)	Alain Guicharrousse	19-Mar-1963	France	55.33 m (181 ft 6 in)

==== M60 Javelin Throw ====
31 athletes, 2 flights and final held on September 12, 2018

Pos	Athlete	Birthdate	Country	Result
1st place, gold medalist(s)	Serhii Havras	16-Jun-1957	Ukraine	55.48 m (182 ft 0 in)
2nd place, silver medalist(s)	Luis Nogueira Fernández	15-Jan-1956	Spain	54.49 m (178 ft 9 in)
3rd place, bronze medalist(s)	Reinhold Paul	10-Feb-1957	Germany	49.51 m (162 ft 5 in)

==== M65 Javelin Throw ====
29 athletes, 2 flights and final held on September 12, 2018

Pos	Athlete	Birthdate	Country	Result
1st place, gold medalist(s)	Hannu Kortesluoma	22-Jun-1951	Finland	44.65 m (146 ft 5 in)
2nd place, silver medalist(s)	Walter Kuhndel	02-Feb-1952	Germany	44.57 m (146 ft 2 in)
3rd place, bronze medalist(s)	Fabio Francesco Diotallevi	08-Mar-1952	Italy	43.46 m (142 ft 7 in)

==== M70 Javelin Throw ====
17 athletes, 1 flight and final held on September 12, 2018

Pos	Athlete	Birthdate	Country	Result
1st place, gold medalist(s)	Esa Kiuru	14-Apr-1947	Finland	53.13 m (174 ft 3 in) WR
2nd place, silver medalist(s)	Dereck Sterley	20-Jul-1947	South Africa	41.43 m (135 ft 11 in)
3rd place, bronze medalist(s)	Helmut Hessert	20-Sep-1945	Germany	41.08 m (134 ft 9 in)

==== M75 Javelin Throw ====
21 athletes, 1 flight and final held on September 10, 2018

Pos	Athlete	Birthdate	Country	Result
1st place, gold medalist(s)	Jouni Tenhu	30-Apr-1939	Finland	43.24 m (141 ft 10 in)
2nd place, silver medalist(s)	Reinhard Dahms	01-May-1939	Germany	36.24 m (118 ft 10 in)
3rd place, bronze medalist(s)	Kalevi Honkanen	12-May-1939	Finland	34.97 m (114 ft 8 in)

==== M80 Javelin Throw ====
17 athletes, 1 flight and final held on September 10, 2018

Pos	Athlete	Birthdate	Country	Result
1st place, gold medalist(s)	Lothar Huchthausen	13-Mar-1935	Germany	37.45 m (122 ft 10 in)
2nd place, silver medalist(s)	Tauno Tukkinen	12-Mar-1938	Finland	33.86 m (111 ft 1 in)
3rd place, bronze medalist(s)	Victor Adcock	28-Nov-1937	Great Britain	33.16 m (108 ft 9 in)

==== M85 Javelin Throw ====
15 athletes, 1 flight and final held on September 10, 2018

Pos	Athlete	Birthdate	Country	Result
1st place, gold medalist(s)	Takumi Matsushima	31-May-1932	Brazil	27.11 m (88 ft 11 in)
2nd place, silver medalist(s)	Emilio Fernando Galindo D'Andun	08-Apr-1933	Mexico	25.44 m (83 ft 5 in)
3rd place, bronze medalist(s)	Petrus Verdonck	01-Oct-1932	Belgium	25.22 m (82 ft 8 in)

==== M90 Javelin Throw ====
7 athletes, 1 flight and final held on September 10, 2018

Pos	Athlete	Birthdate	Country	Result
1st place, gold medalist(s)	Rene Turpin	25-Mar-1927	France	15.64 m (51 ft 3 in)
2nd place, silver medalist(s)	Lauri Helle	01-May-1925	Finland	14.15 m (46 ft 5 in)
3rd place, bronze medalist(s)	Georges Frustier	26-Mar-1928	France	12.18 m (39 ft 11 in)

=== Weight Throw ===
==== M35 Weight Throw ====
15 athletes, 1 flight and final held on September 11, 2018

Pos	Athlete	Birthdate	Country	Result
1st place, gold medalist(s)	Genro Paas	05-May-1979	Estonia	16.17 m (53 ft 0 in)
2nd place, silver medalist(s)	Jiri Koukal	23-Jun-1982	Slovakia	16.10 m (52 ft 9 in)
3rd place, bronze medalist(s)	Joan Bea	27-Nov-1980	Spain	15.66 m (51 ft 4 in)

==== M40 Weight Throw ====
9 athletes, 1 flight and final held on September 11, 2018

Pos	Athlete	Birthdate	Country	Result
1st place, gold medalist(s)	Ignacio Calderón Aguado	23-Jun-1976	Spain	16.73 m (54 ft 10 in)
2nd place, silver medalist(s)	Aldo Bello Morillo	23-May-1975	Venezuela	16.42 m (53 ft 10 in)
3rd place, bronze medalist(s)	Jussi Murtasaari	26-Jul-1976	Finland	15.37 m (50 ft 5 in)

==== M45 Weight Throw ====
16 athletes, 1 flight and final held on September 11, 2018

Pos	Athlete	Birthdate	Country	Result
1st place, gold medalist(s)	Mariusz Walczak	27-Feb-1971	Poland	17.69 m (58 ft 0 in)
2nd place, silver medalist(s)	Pavel Penaz	04-Apr-1969	Czech Republic	17.35 m (56 ft 11 in)
3rd place, bronze medalist(s)	Sami Siren	14-Nov-1972	Finland	17.08 m (56 ft 0 in)

==== M50 Weight Throw ====
21 athletes, 1 flight and final held on September 11, 2018

Pos	Athlete	Birthdate	Country	Result
1st place, gold medalist(s)	Laurent Bettolo	09-Mar-1966	France	21.15 m (69 ft 4 in)
2nd place, silver medalist(s)	Jan Cordius	12-Apr-1966	Denmark	19.93 m (65 ft 4 in)
3rd place, bronze medalist(s)	Guillermo Guzman	28-Feb-1964	Mexico	17.84 m (58 ft 6 in)

==== M55 Weight Throw ====
25 athletes, 2 flights and final held on September 11, 2018

Pos	Athlete	Birthdate	Country	Result
1st place, gold medalist(s)	Norbert Demmel	10-May-1963	Germany	19.20 m (62 ft 11 in)
2nd place, silver medalist(s)	Lech Kowalski	17-Jan-1961	Poland	17.60 m (57 ft 8 in)
3rd place, bronze medalist(s)	Pekka Sinisaari	20-Mar-1962	Finland	17.57 m (57 ft 7 in)

==== M60 Weight Throw ====
27 athletes, 2 flights and final held on September 11, 2018

Pos	Athlete	Birthdate	Country	Result
1st place, gold medalist(s)	Gottfried Gassenbauer	17-Aug-1958	Austria	19.03 m (62 ft 5 in)
2nd place, silver medalist(s)	Daniel Gustavo De Zuani	27-Sep-1957	Argentina	18.61 m (61 ft 0 in)
3rd place, bronze medalist(s)	Vasileios Manganas	07-May-1954	Greece	18.20 m (59 ft 8 in)

==== M65 Weight Throw ====
23 athletes, 2 flights and final held on September 11, 2018

Pos	Athlete	Birthdate	Country	Result
1st place, gold medalist(s)	Andrzej Piaczkowski	02-Apr-1950	Poland	17.11 m (56 ft 1 in)
2nd place, silver medalist(s)	Guy Dirkin	31-Dec-1952	Great Britain	16.45 m (53 ft 11 in)
3rd place, bronze medalist(s)	Waclaw Krankowski	19-Jan-1951	Poland	16.33 m (53 ft 6 in)

==== M70 Weight Throw ====
24 athletes, 2 flights and final held on September 11, 2018

Pos	Athlete	Birthdate	Country	Result
1st place, gold medalist(s)	Arild Busterud	26-Jan-1948	Norway	23.15 m (75 ft 11 in)
2nd place, silver medalist(s)	Jerzy Jablonski	23-Apr-1945	Poland	20.50 m (67 ft 3 in)
3rd place, bronze medalist(s)	Gerard Guyot	15-Nov-1944	France	20.40 m (66 ft 11 in)

==== M75 Weight Throw ====
13 athletes, 1 flight and final held on September 11, 2018

Pos	Athlete	Birthdate	Country	Result
1st place, gold medalist(s)	George Mathews	28-Jul-1943	United States	17.41 m (57 ft 1 in)
2nd place, silver medalist(s)	Gerard Vignot	07-Jan-1943	France	16.96 m (55 ft 7 in)
3rd place, bronze medalist(s)	John Watts	23-Apr-1939	Great Britain	16.78 m (55 ft 0 in)

==== M80 Weight Throw ====
17 athletes, 1 flight and final held on September 10, 2018

Pos	Athlete	Birthdate	Country	Result
1st place, gold medalist(s)	Andrzej Rzepecki	13-Aug-1936	South Africa	17.99 m (59 ft 0 in)
2nd place, silver medalist(s)	Ernest Tuff	08-May-1938	Great Britain	17.06 m (55 ft 11 in)
3rd place, bronze medalist(s)	Antoni Kargol	09-Jan-1937	Poland	16.84 m (55 ft 2 in)

==== M85 Weight Throw ====
14 athletes, 1 flight and final held on September 10, 2018

Pos	Athlete	Birthdate	Country	Result
1st place, gold medalist(s)	Helmut Bruning	02-Jul-1933	Germany	12.54 m (41 ft 1 in)
2nd place, silver medalist(s)	Wendelin Acker	03-Jun-1933	Germany	11.59 m (38 ft 0 in)
3rd place, bronze medalist(s)	Anton Laus	25-May-1933	Estonia	11.50 m (37 ft 8 in)

==== M90 Weight Throw ====
6 athletes, 1 flight and final held on September 10, 2018

Pos	Athlete	Birthdate	Country	Result
1st place, gold medalist(s)	Lauri Helle	01-May-1925	Finland	7.66 m (25 ft 1 in)
2nd place, silver medalist(s)	Christian Tittel	28-May-1928	Australia	7.04 m (23 ft 1 in)
3rd place, bronze medalist(s)	Georges Frustier	26-Mar-1928	France	6.68 m (21 ft 10 in)

=== Throws Pentathlon ===
==== M35 Throws Pentathlon ====
13 athletes, held on September 14, 2018

Pos	Athlete	Birthdate	Country	Result
1st place, gold medalist(s)	Genro Paas	05-May-1979	Estonia	3560
1st place, gold medalist(s)	Hammer / Shot put / Discus / Javelin / Weight; 54.30m / 14.66m / 42.87m / 43.04m / 15.02m			
2nd place, silver medalist(s)	Geert Bruninx	20-Jul-1983	Belgium	3069
2nd place, silver medalist(s)	Hammer / Shot put / Discus / Javelin / Weight; 40.52m / 13.24m / 35.90m / 45.66m / 13.96m			
3rd place, bronze medalist(s)	Pascal Nolin	24-Sep-1978	France	2865
3rd place, bronze medalist(s)	Hammer / Shot put / Discus / Javelin / Weight; 41.57m / 12.90m / 36.78m / 35.76m / 12.74m			

==== M40 Throws Pentathlon ====
16 athletes, held on September 14, 2018

Pos	Athlete	Birthdate	Country	Result
1st place, gold medalist(s)	Petros Mitsides	12-Dec-1977	Cyprus	3685
1st place, gold medalist(s)	Hammer / Shot put / Discus / Javelin / Weight; 43.82m / 13.95m / 48.17m / 41.96m / 13.87m			
2nd place, silver medalist(s)	Gwenael Vandeville	19-Jun-1975	France	3632
2nd place, silver medalist(s)	Hammer / Shot put / Discus / Javelin / Weight; 54.43m / 11.40m / 40.17m / 39.72m / 16.12m			
3rd place, bronze medalist(s)	Miguel Álvarez Cuervo	28-Mar-1975	Spain	3435
3rd place, bronze medalist(s)	Hammer / Shot put / Discus / Javelin / Weight; 40.39m / 11.81m / 39.92m / 54.08m / 13.11m			

==== M45 Throws Pentathlon ====
19 athletes, held on September 14, 2018

Pos	Athlete	Birthdate	Country	Result
1st place, gold medalist(s)	Pavel Penaz	04-Apr-1969	Czech Republic	4112
1st place, gold medalist(s)	Hammer / Shot put / Discus / Javelin / Weight; 47.48m / 13.42m / 42.73m / 43.08m / 15.76m			
2nd place, silver medalist(s)	Ralf Mordhorst	11-May-1973	Germany	3945
2nd place, silver medalist(s)	Hammer / Shot put / Discus / Javelin / Weight; 34.59m / 14.68m / 50.20m / 43.10m / 12.99m			
3rd place, bronze medalist(s)	Jon Bjarni Bragason	28-Jul-1971	Iceland	3924
3rd place, bronze medalist(s)	Hammer / Shot put / Discus / Javelin / Weight; 46.04m / 12.64m / 41.56m / 44.91m / 14.25m			

==== M50 Throws Pentathlon ====
28 athletes, held on September 13, 2018

Pos	Athlete	Birthdate	Country	Result
1st place, gold medalist(s)	Jan Cordius	12-Apr-1966	Denmark	4592
1st place, gold medalist(s)	Hammer / Shot put / Discus / Javelin / Weight; 56.26m / 14.35m / 50.23m / 51.30m / 19.58m			
2nd place, silver medalist(s)	Iver Hytten	03-Jan-1966	Norway	4480
2nd place, silver medalist(s)	Hammer / Shot put / Discus / Javelin / Weight; 47.12m / 15.45m / 49.74m / 55.10m / 18.43m			
3rd place, bronze medalist(s)	Joachim Rieck	02-Sep-1966	Germany	3538
3rd place, bronze medalist(s)	Hammer / Shot put / Discus / Javelin / Weight; 43.61m / 12.23m / 41.73m / 41.03m / 14.93m			

==== M55 Throws Pentathlon ====
31 athletes, held on September 14, 2018

Pos	Athlete	Birthdate	Country	Result
1st place, gold medalist(s)	Norbert Demmel	10-May-1963	Germany	5103 WR
1st place, gold medalist(s)	Hammer / Shot put / Discus / Javelin / Weight; 51.06m / 14.91m / 54.02m / 55.57m / 18.56m			
2nd place, silver medalist(s)	Tom Jensen	29-Jan-1960	Denmark	4130
2nd place, silver medalist(s)	Hammer / Shot put / Discus / Javelin / Weight; 46.53m / 12.13m / 44.83m / 45.42m / 14.97m			
3rd place, bronze medalist(s)	Pekka Sinisaari	20-Mar-1962	Finland	3925
3rd place, bronze medalist(s)	Hammer / Shot put / Discus / Javelin / Weight; 47.97m / 11.84m / 40.51m / 35.03m / 16.40m			

==== M60 Throws Pentathlon ====
28 athletes, held on September 13, 2018

Pos	Athlete	Birthdate	Country	Result
1st place, gold medalist(s)	David Abernethy	05-Sep-1955	Great Britain	4073
1st place, gold medalist(s)	Hammer / Shot put / Discus / Javelin / Weight; 39.39m / 13.33m / 48.49m / 39.07m / 17.36m			
2nd place, silver medalist(s)	Edward Zwolski	19-Apr-1956	Poland	4043
2nd place, silver medalist(s)	Hammer / Shot put / Discus / Javelin / Weight; 44.80m / 12.12m / 44.78m / 42.59m / 16.58m			
3rd place, bronze medalist(s)	Rainer Horstmann	23-Feb-1957	Germany	3895
3rd place, bronze medalist(s)	Hammer / Shot put / Discus / Javelin / Weight; 34.55m / 13.09m / 43.91m / 46.10m / 15.63m			

==== M65 Throws Pentathlon ====
28 athletes, held on September 14, 2018

Pos	Athlete	Birthdate	Country	Result
1st place, gold medalist(s)	Arvo Nurm	20-Sep-1948	Estonia	4048
1st place, gold medalist(s)	Hammer / Shot put / Discus / Javelin / Weight; 38.86m / 12.46m / 35.01m / 39.52m / 16.05m			
2nd place, silver medalist(s)	Waclaw Krankowski	19-Jan-1951	Poland	4024
2nd place, silver medalist(s)	Hammer / Shot put / Discus / Javelin / Weight; 39.45m / 12.64m / 41.12m / 30.93m / 16.07m			
3rd place, bronze medalist(s)	Joseph Myers	10-Jun-1952	United States	3799
3rd place, bronze medalist(s)	Hammer / Shot put / Discus / Javelin / Weight; 34.64m / 12.76m / 39.71m / 33.18m / 13.96m			

==== M70 Throws Pentathlon ====
27 athletes, held on September 15, 2018

Pos	Athlete	Birthdate	Country	Result
1st place, gold medalist(s)	Arild Busterud	26-Jan-1948	Norway	5067
1st place, gold medalist(s)	Hammer / Shot put / Discus / Javelin / Weight; 56.72m / 14.22m / 43.35m / 29.71m / 21.52m			
2nd place, silver medalist(s)	Seppo Hjelm	09-May-1947	Finland	4647
2nd place, silver medalist(s)	Hammer / Shot put / Discus / Javelin / Weight; 49.09m / 13.35m / 37.92m / 36.01m / 18.89m			
3rd place, bronze medalist(s)	Barry Hawksworth	17-Jan-1947	Great Britain	4378
3rd place, bronze medalist(s)	Hammer / Shot put / Discus / Javelin / Weight; 48.76m / 11.40m / 35.84m / 37.34m / 17.59m			

==== M75 Throws Pentathlon ====
13 athletes, held on September 15, 2018

Pos	Athlete	Birthdate	Country	Result
1st place, gold medalist(s)	Gunther Fandrich	05-Nov-1941	Germany	4207
1st place, gold medalist(s)	Hammer / Shot put / Discus / Javelin / Weight; 42.81m / 10.51m / 29.35m / 32.48m / 14.44m			
2nd place, silver medalist(s)	Czeslaw Roszczak	18-Jun-1941	Poland	4041
2nd place, silver medalist(s)	Hammer / Shot put / Discus / Javelin / Weight; 35.97m / 11.66m / 33.04m / 29.51m / 13.16m			
3rd place, bronze medalist(s)	Claude Letourneur	23-Apr-1939	France	4016
3rd place, bronze medalist(s)	Hammer / Shot put / Discus / Javelin / Weight; 32.76m / 11.04m / 36.50m / 30.40m / 13.05m			

==== M80 Throws Pentathlon ====
14 athletes, held on September 12, 2018

Pos	Athlete	Birthdate	Country	Result
1st place, gold medalist(s)	Lothar Huchthausen	13-Mar-1935	Germany	4799
1st place, gold medalist(s)	Hammer / Shot put / Discus / Javelin / Weight; 38.11m / 11.51m / 29.64m / 38.31m / 14.31m			
2nd place, silver medalist(s)	Andrzej Rzepecki	13-Aug-1936	South Africa	4656
2nd place, silver medalist(s)	Hammer / Shot put / Discus / Javelin / Weight; 43.77m / 10.66m / 27.95m / 23.59m / 18.04m			
3rd place, bronze medalist(s)	Herbert Raml	26-Aug-1938	Germany	4468
3rd place, bronze medalist(s)	Hammer / Shot put / Discus / Javelin / Weight; 36.57m / 11.52m / 29.47m / 31.38m / 13.59m			

==== M85 Throws Pentathlon ====
11 athletes, held on September 12, 2018

Pos	Athlete	Birthdate	Country	Result
1st place, gold medalist(s)	Takumi Matsushima	31-May-1932	Brazil	3995
1st place, gold medalist(s)	Hammer / Shot put / Discus / Javelin / Weight; 29.15m / 7.77m / 22.42m / 27.38m / 11.40m			
2nd place, silver medalist(s)	Anton Laus	25-May-1933	Estonia	3973
2nd place, silver medalist(s)	Hammer / Shot put / Discus / Javelin / Weight; 28.41m / 9.48m / 22.65m / 23.02m / 11.15m			
3rd place, bronze medalist(s)	Wendelin Acker	03-Jun-1933	Germany	3791
3rd place, bronze medalist(s)	Hammer / Shot put / Discus / Javelin / Weight; 29.61m / 10.00m / 19.60m / 17.90m / 11.46m			

==== M90 Throws Pentathlon ====
5 athletes, held on September 12, 2018

Pos	Athlete	Birthdate	Country	Result
1st place, gold medalist(s)	Lauri Helle	01-May-1925	Finland	2876
1st place, gold medalist(s)	Hammer / Shot put / Discus / Javelin / Weight; 16.96m / 7.05m / 12.87m / 11.63m / 8.53m			
2nd place, silver medalist(s)	Georges Frustier	26-Mar-1928	France	2480
2nd place, silver medalist(s)	Hammer / Shot put / Discus / Javelin / Weight; 13.75m / 6.01m / 12.87m / 12.20m / 6.92m			
3rd place, bronze medalist(s)	Christian Tittel	28-May-1928	Australia	2157
3rd place, bronze medalist(s)	Hammer / Shot put / Discus / Javelin / Weight; 12.92m / 5.13m / 13.40m / 8.87m / 6.17m			

=== Decathlon ===
==== M35 Decathlon ====
20 athletes, held on September 4–5, 2018

Pos	Athlete	Birthdate	Country	Result
1st place, gold medalist(s)	Matthias Laube	24-May-1983	Germany	6745
1st place, gold medalist(s)	100m / Long jump / Shot put / High jump / 400m / 110m H / Discus / Pole vault / Javelin / 1500m; 11.70 / 6.22m / 11.84m / 1.84m / 55.12 / 15.52 / 35.98m / 4.20m / 52.73m / 4:54.99			
2nd place, silver medalist(s)	David Céspedes Díaz	12-May-1983	Spain	6254
2nd place, silver medalist(s)	100m / Long jump / Shot put / High jump / 400m / 110m H / Discus / Pole vault / Javelin / 1500m; 11.76 / 6.03m / 11.35m / 1.69m / 53.03 / 15.81 / 32.98m / 4.10m / 44.66m / 5:16.52			
3rd place, bronze medalist(s)	Branislav Puvak	22-Sep-1978	Slovakia	6167
3rd place, bronze medalist(s)	100m / Long jump / Shot put / High jump / 400m / 110m H / Discus / Pole vault / Javelin / 1500m; 11.86 / 6.26m / 9.84m / 1.78m / 55.44 / 16.20 / 36.82m / 4.00m / 40.33m / 5:05.43			

==== M40 Decathlon ====
28 athletes, held on September 4–5, 2018

Pos	Athlete	Birthdate	Country	Result
1st place, gold medalist(s)	Óscar González	08-Aug-1976	Spain	7227
1st place, gold medalist(s)	100m / Long jump / Shot put / High jump / 400m / 110m H / Discus / Pole vault / Javelin / 1500m; 12.35 / 6.58m / 11.71m / 1.84m / 54.03 / 15.69 / 38.74m / 4.00m / 44.64m / 4:58.55			
2nd place, silver medalist(s)	Mike Kuoppamaki	22-Mar-1975	United States	7002
2nd place, silver medalist(s)	100m / Long jump / Shot put / High jump / 400m / 110m H / Discus / Pole vault / Javelin / 1500m; 12.34 / 6.56m / 12.28m / 1.78m / 55.12 / 16.09 / 39.98m / 4.10m / 44.39m / 5:29.38			
3rd place, bronze medalist(s)	Justin Francois	22-Mar-1976	Netherlands	6792
3rd place, bronze medalist(s)	100m / Long jump / Shot put / High jump / 400m / 110m H / Discus / Pole vault / Javelin / 1500m; 11.75 / 6.01m / 11.83m / 1.72m / 54.05 / 15.54 / 32.39m / 3.80m / 43.22m / 5:16.89			

==== M45 Decathlon ====
27 athletes, held on September 4–5, 2018

Pos	Athlete	Birthdate	Country	Result
1st place, gold medalist(s)	Michael Hoffer	06-Jul-1972	Sweden	7353
1st place, gold medalist(s)	100m / Long jump / Shot put / High jump / 400m / 110m H / Discus / Pole vault / Javelin / 1500m; 12.52 / 6.23m / 12.12m / 1.83m / 58.65 / 16.38 / 38.53m / 3.80m / 49.33m / 5:51.70			
2nd place, silver medalist(s)	Justin Hanrahan	02-Dec-1969	Australia	6930
2nd place, silver medalist(s)	100m / Long jump / Shot put / High jump / 400m / 110m H / Discus / Pole vault / Javelin / 1500m; 12.19 / 6.29m / 10.77m / 1.80m / 56.73 / 17.51 / 33.76m / 3.20m / 39.54m / 5:22.19			
3rd place, bronze medalist(s)	Guido Frank	..-..-1971	Germany	6495
3rd place, bronze medalist(s)	100m / Long jump / Shot put / High jump / 400m / 110m H / Discus / Pole vault / Javelin / 1500m; 12.83 / 5.58m / 11.23m / 1.65m / 58.02 / 18.63 / 33.61m / 3.30m / 48.20m / 5:26.28			

==== M50 Decathlon ====
40 athletes, held on September 4–5, 2018

Pos	Athlete	Birthdate	Country	Result
1st place, gold medalist(s)	Thomas Stewens	10-Sep-1966	Germany	8068 WR
1st place, gold medalist(s)	100m (wind) / Long jump (wind) / Shot put / High jump / 400m / 100m H (wind) / Discus / Pole vault / Javelin / 1500m; 12.88 / 6.22m / 13.31m / 1.71m / 57.31 / 15.20 / 40.52m / 3.85m / 47.66m / 4:57.52			
2nd place, silver medalist(s)	José Antonio Ureña Vano	20-Jan-1967	Spain	7799
2nd place, silver medalist(s)	100m (wind) / Long jump (wind) / Shot put / High jump / 400m / 100m H (wind) / Discus / Pole vault / Javelin / 1500m; 13.01 / 6.21m / 12.56m / 1.59m / 56.04 / 15.24 / 39.42m / 3.75m / 41.02m / 4:45.62			
3rd place, bronze medalist(s)	Jurgen van Berkum	04-Sep-1967	Netherlands	7188
3rd place, bronze medalist(s)	100m (wind) / Long jump (wind) / Shot put / High jump / 400m / 100m H (wind) / Discus / Pole vault / Javelin / 1500m; 13.25 / 6.21m / 9.46m / 1.65m / 55.22 / 15.57 / 29.67m / 3.35m / 37.83m / 4:46.59			

==== M55 Decathlon ====
37 athletes, held on September 6–7, 2018

Pos	Athlete	Birthdate	Country	Result
1st place, gold medalist(s)	Angel Estuardo Díaz Granillo	10-May-1963	Guatemala	7627
1st place, gold medalist(s)	100m (wind) / Long jump (wind) / Shot put / High jump / 400m / 100m H (wind) / Discus / Pole vault / Javelin / 1500m; 12.63 / 5.40m / 10.48m / 1.74m / 58.53 / 14.98 / 33.03m / 3.35m / 39.37m / 6:06.52			
2nd place, silver medalist(s)	Jerzy Krauze	14-Jul-1963	Poland	7452
2nd place, silver medalist(s)	100m (wind) / Long jump (wind) / Shot put / High jump / 400m / 100m H (wind) / Discus / Pole vault / Javelin / 1500m; 12.49 / 5.14m / 10.97m / 1.56m / 1:01.69 / 16.15 / 33.36m / 3.65m / 47.13m / 6:02.70			
3rd place, bronze medalist(s)	Henryk Gulbinovic	26-Apr-1962	Lithuania	6945
3rd place, bronze medalist(s)	100m (wind) / Long jump (wind) / Shot put / High jump / 400m / 100m H (wind) / Discus / Pole vault / Javelin / 1500m; 12.38 / 5.25m / 11.20m / 1.56m / 1:01.36 / 16.12 / 36.68m / 3.05m / 33.27m / 6:40.35			

==== M60 Decathlon ====
30 athletes, held on September 6–7, 2018

Pos	Athlete	Birthdate	Country	Result
1st place, gold medalist(s)	Hubert Indra	24-Mar-1957	Italy	8158
1st place, gold medalist(s)	100m (wind) / Long jump (wind) / Shot put / High jump / 400m / 100m H (wind) / Discus / Pole vault / Javelin / 1500m; 13.58 / 4.90m / 11.60m / 1.67m / 1:02.35 / 15.94 / 42.15m / 3.70m / 41.25m / 5:46.27			
2nd place, silver medalist(s)	Brian Slaughter	27-Jul-1957	Great Britain	7314
2nd place, silver medalist(s)	100m (wind) / Long jump (wind) / Shot put / High jump / 400m / 100m H (wind) / Discus / Pole vault / Javelin / 1500m; 13.31 / 4.87m / 11.56m / 1.43m / 1:01.68 / 17.29 / 38.35m / 2.80m / 36.92m / 5:31.15			
3rd place, bronze medalist(s)	Gabor Bodnar	01-Nov-1956	Hungary	6898
3rd place, bronze medalist(s)	100m (wind) / Long jump (wind) / Shot put / High jump / 400m / 100m H (wind) / Discus / Pole vault / Javelin / 1500m; 12.62 / 4.71m / 11.88m / 1.46m / 1:09.71 / 16.85 / 39.95m / 3.00m / 35.75m / 7:02.83			

==== M65 Decathlon ====
15 athletes, held on September 6–7, 2018

Pos	Athlete	Birthdate	Country	Result
1st place, gold medalist(s)	Heinz Baseda	12-Apr-1953	Germany	7079
1st place, gold medalist(s)	100m (wind) / Long jump (wind) / Shot put / High jump / 400m / 100m H (wind) / Discus / Pole vault / Javelin / 1500m; 14.15 / 4.67m / 8.62m / 1.48m / 1:06.59 / 18.76 / 31.43m / 2.85m / 34.87m / 6:20.94			
2nd place, silver medalist(s)	Russell Jacquet-Acea	11-Dec-1952	United States	6471
2nd place, silver medalist(s)	100m (wind) / Long jump (wind) / Shot put / High jump / 400m / 100m H (wind) / Discus / Pole vault / Javelin / 1500m; 14.23 / 4.38m / 8.67m / 1.30m / 1:07.31 / 17.92 / 28.82m / 2.65m / 27.92m / 6:25.33			
3rd place, bronze medalist(s)	Isao Harasawa	30-Jun-1952	Japan	6231
3rd place, bronze medalist(s)	100m (wind) / Long jump (wind) / Shot put / High jump / 400m / 100m H (wind) / Discus / Pole vault / Javelin / 1500m; 14.27 / 4.05m / 6.55m / 1.33m / 1:06.54 / 19.71 / 23.07m / 2.65m / 29.34m / 5:32.14			

==== M70 Decathlon ====
16 athletes, held on September 6–7, 2018

Pos	Athlete	Birthdate	Country	Result
1st place, gold medalist(s)	Geoff Shaw	05-Feb-1948	Australia	7133
1st place, gold medalist(s)	100m (wind) / Long jump (wind) / Shot put / High jump / 400m / 80m H (wind) / Discus / Pole vault / Javelin / 1500m; 14.77 / 4.56m / 8.00m / 1.39m / 1:09.93 / 15.86 / 25.31m / 3.00m / 23.95m / 6:16.66			
2nd place, silver medalist(s)	Voldemar Kangilaski	19-Jul-1947	Estonia	5744
2nd place, silver medalist(s)	100m (wind) / Long jump (wind) / Shot put / High jump / 400m / 80m H (wind) / Discus / Pole vault / Javelin / 1500m; 14.36 / 4.13m / 8.34m / 1.30m / 1:20.52 / 19.32 / 24.13m / 2.40m / 23.74m / 7:02.86			
3rd place, bronze medalist(s)	Stefan Hallgrimsson	16-Jul-1948	Iceland	5693
3rd place, bronze medalist(s)	100m (wind) / Long jump (wind) / Shot put / High jump / 400m / 80m H (wind) / Discus / Pole vault / Javelin / 1500m; 16.95 / 3.62m / 9.24m / 1.33m / 1:21.08 / 18.23 / 29.23m / 2.50m / 29.86m / 7:02.67			

==== M75 Decathlon ====
11 athletes, held on September 6–7, 2018

Pos	Athlete	Birthdate	Country	Result
1st place, gold medalist(s)	Jean-Claude Chaumont	21-Aug-1943	France	6055
1st place, gold medalist(s)	100m (wind) / Long jump (wind) / Shot put / High jump / 400m / 80m H (wind) / Discus / Pole vault / Javelin / 1500m; 16.07 / 3.93m / 7.83m / 1.22m / 1:14.75 / 19.35 / 20.60m / 1.80m / 25.58m / 7:14.63			
2nd place, silver medalist(s)	Nils Baeck	13-Feb-1943	Sweden	5985
2nd place, silver medalist(s)	100m (wind) / Long jump (wind) / Shot put / High jump / 400m / 80m H (wind) / Discus / Pole vault / Javelin / 1500m; 16.48 / 3.55m / 9.79m / 1.19m / 1:20.46 / 17.87 / 22.66m / 1.70m / 27.44m / 7:15.82			
3rd place, bronze medalist(s)	Willi Klaus	06-Nov-1938	Germany	5754
3rd place, bronze medalist(s)	100m (wind) / Long jump (wind) / Shot put / High jump / 400m / 80m H (wind) / Discus / Pole vault / Javelin / 1500m; 16.17 / 3.75m / 8.83m / 1.28m / 1:18.17 / 17.78 / 23.62m / 2.10m / NM / 7:39.64			

==== M80 Decathlon ====
6 athletes, held on September 4–5, 2018

Pos	Athlete	Birthdate	Country	Result
1st place, gold medalist(s)	Knut Henrik Skramstad	10-Jan-1937	Norway	6959
1st place, gold medalist(s)	100m (wind) / Long jump (wind) / Shot put / High jump / 400m / 80m H (wind) / Discus / Pole vault / Javelin / 1500m; 17.48 / 3.34m / 9.37m / 1.15m / 1:31.66 / 16.94 / 25.90m / 2.30m / 27.84m / 8:42.89			
2nd place, silver medalist(s)	Paulus Makkonen	30-Sep-1937	Finland	6760
2nd place, silver medalist(s)	100m (wind) / Long jump (wind) / Shot put / High jump / 400m / 80m H (wind) / Discus / Pole vault / Javelin / 1500m; 17.53 / 3.44m / 10.80m / 1.15m / 1:34.38 / 17.77 / 26.67m / 2.30m / 23.56m / 9:20.72			
3rd place, bronze medalist(s)	Hans Miekautsch	27-Dec-1937	Austria	5911
3rd place, bronze medalist(s)	100m (wind) / Long jump (wind) / Shot put / High jump / 400m / 80m H (wind) / Discus / Pole vault / Javelin / 1500m; 16.99 / 3.39m / 8.12m / 1.21m / 1:30.22 / 19.49 / 19.39m / 1.70m / 19.84m / 9:08.27			

==== M85 Decathlon ====
4 athletes, held on September 4–5, 2018

Pos	Athlete	Birthdate	Country	Result
1st place, gold medalist(s)	Ted Rowan	23-Jul-1933	Canada	7110 WR
1st place, gold medalist(s)	100m (wind) / Long jump (wind) / Shot put / High jump / 400m / 80m H (wind) / Discus / Pole vault / Javelin / 1500m; 16.99 / 3.31m / 8.08m / 1.09m / 1:40.25 / 20.09 / 25.87m / 1.60m / 19.86m / 9:43.23			
2nd place, silver medalist(s)	Eduard Bscheid	02-Apr-1932	Germany	4701
2nd place, silver medalist(s)	100m (wind) / Long jump (wind) / Shot put / High jump / 400m / 80m H (wind) / Discus / Pole vault / Javelin / 1500m; 18.98 / 2.76m / 7.92m / 1.00m / 1:55.69 / 21.74 / 15.38m / NM / 18.40m / 11:11.67			

=== 5000 metres Racewalk ===
Held September 6, 2018

==== M35 5000 metres Racewalk ====
8 athletes

Pos	Athlete	Birthdate	Country	Result
1st place, gold medalist(s)	Dominic King	30-May-1983	Great Britain	21:36.61
2nd place, silver medalist(s)	Juan Manuel Morales Del Castillo	28-Dec-1979	Spain	22:03.71
3rd place, bronze medalist(s)	Angel Blanco Hidalgo	19-Nov-1980	Spain	22:28.02

==== M40 5000 metres Racewalk ====
19 athletes

Pos	Athlete	Birthdate	Country	Result
1st place, gold medalist(s)	Eric Maugo Shikuku	26-Aug-1974	Kenya	20:45.08
2nd place, silver medalist(s)	Rick Liesting	18-Jul-1977	Netherlands	20:58.78
3rd place, bronze medalist(s)	Stephane Poirout	16-Apr-1976	France	22:07.52

==== M45 5000 metres Racewalk ====
29 athletes

Pos	Athlete	Birthdate	Country	Result
1st place, gold medalist(s)	Juan Antonio Porras Hidalgo	19-Feb-1972	Spain	22:17.50
2nd place, silver medalist(s)	Normunds Ivzans	17-Nov-1971	Latvia	22:26.53
3rd place, bronze medalist(s)	Rafael Martín Jiménez	26-Dec-1970	Spain	22:31.95

==== M50 5000 metres Racewalk ====
31 athletes

Pos	Athlete	Birthdate	Country	Result
1st place, gold medalist(s)	Miguel Angel Carvajal Ortega	14-Jul-1965	Spain	22:36.21
2nd place, silver medalist(s)	Philippe Bonneau	28-Mar-1965	France	23:06.90
3rd place, bronze medalist(s)	Leonardo Toro López	07-May-1967	Spain	23:26.35

==== M55 5000 metres Racewalk ====
22 athletes

Pos	Athlete	Birthdate	Country	Result
1st place, gold medalist(s)	Miguel Periáñez García	02-Nov-1962	Spain	23:10.37
2nd place, silver medalist(s)	Ray Sharp	25-Nov-1959	United States	23:31.14
3rd place, bronze medalist(s)	Francisco Reis	14-Aug-1960	Portugal	23:40.21

==== M60 5000 metres Racewalk ====
19 athletes

Pos	Athlete	Birthdate	Country	Result
1st place, gold medalist(s)	Adan Mendez Montiel	27-Jan-1958	Mexico	26:12.51
2nd place, silver medalist(s)	Colin Heywood	08-Jul-1954	Australia	27:06.38
3rd place, bronze medalist(s)	Jesús Javier Moreno Mate	07-Jul-1957	Spain	27:19.63

==== M65 5000 metres Racewalk ====
21 athletes

Pos	Athlete	Birthdate	Country	Result
1st place, gold medalist(s)	Jose Luis Lopez Camarena	24-Sep-1949	Mexico	25:34.45
2nd place, silver medalist(s)	Ignacio Melo Valls	28-Dec-1952	Spain	26:13.22
3rd place, bronze medalist(s)	Patrice Brochot	03-Aug-1951	France	26:43.60

==== M70 5000 metres Racewalk ====
26 athletes

Pos	Athlete	Birthdate	Country	Result
1st place, gold medalist(s)	Ian Richards	12-Apr-1948	Great Britain	25:51.34
2nd place, silver medalist(s)	Ettorino Formentin	22-Mar-1947	Italy	27:25.84
3rd place, bronze medalist(s)	Norman Frable	08-Aug-1947	United States	29:55.54

==== M75 5000 metres Racewalk ====
13 athletes

Pos	Athlete	Birthdate	Country	Result
1st place, gold medalist(s)	Vladimir Kansky	18-Jan-1940	Czech Republic	31:31.34
2nd place, silver medalist(s)	Ralph Bennett	26-Dec-1941	Australia	31:38.26
3rd place, bronze medalist(s)	Marcel Jobin	03-Jan-1942	Canada	32:09.03

==== M80 5000 metres Racewalk ====
13 athletes

Pos	Athlete	Birthdate	Country	Result
1st place, gold medalist(s)	Romolo Pelliccia	19-Sep-1936	Italy	32:00.74
2nd place, silver medalist(s)	Alexis Jordana	10-Feb-1937	France	34:58.32
3rd place, bronze medalist(s)	Mykola Panaseiko	20-Dec-1934	Ukraine	35:43.51

==== M85 5000 metres Racewalk ====
Pos	Athlete	Birthdate	Country	Result
1st place, gold medalist(s)	Ivan Pushkin	30-Jun-1930	Ukraine	37:02.64
2nd place, silver medalist(s)	Ingvar Nilsson	25-Jun-1933	Sweden	41:06.90
3rd place, bronze medalist(s)	Guiben Sun	01-Nov-1928	China	44:31.92

==== M90 5000 metres Racewalk ====
Pos	Athlete	Birthdate	Country	Result
1st place, gold medalist(s)	John Starr	27-Jul-1928	United States	39:14.81
2nd place, silver medalist(s)	Zhiyong Wang	..-..-1924	China	48:34.34

=== 10 km road Racewalk ===
Held September 10, 2018

==== M35 10 km road Racewalk ====
13 athletes

Pos	Athlete	Birthdate	Country	Result
1st place, gold medalist(s)	Dominic King	30-May-1983	Great Britain	44:40
2nd place, silver medalist(s)	Andreas Janker	13-Mar-1983	Germany	45:53
3rd place, bronze medalist(s)	Daniel King	30-May-1983	Great Britain	46:42

==== M40 10 km road Racewalk ====
19 athletes

Pos	Athlete	Birthdate	Country	Result
1st place, gold medalist(s)	Eric Maugo Shikuku	26-Aug-1974	Kenya	43:18
2nd place, silver medalist(s)	Claudio Erasmo Vargas Castillo	09-Dec-1974	Mexico	45:23
3rd place, bronze medalist(s)	Stephane Poirout	16-Apr-1976	France	45:31

==== M45 10 km road Racewalk ====
25 athletes

Pos	Athlete	Birthdate	Country	Result
1st place, gold medalist(s)	Alex Florez Studer	11-May-1971	Switzerland	46:07
2nd place, silver medalist(s)	Normunds Ivzans	17-Nov-1971	Latvia	47:11
3rd place, bronze medalist(s)	Juan Antonio Porras Hidalgo	19-Feb-1972	Spain	47:32

==== M50 10 km road Racewalk ====
35 athletes

Pos	Athlete	Birthdate	Country	Result
1st place, gold medalist(s)	Miguel Angel Carvajal Ortega	14-Jul-1965	Spain	47:31
2nd place, silver medalist(s)	Philippe Bonneau	28-Mar-1965	France	48:19
3rd place, bronze medalist(s)	Leonardo Toro Lopez	07-May-1967	Spain	49:57

==== M55 10 km road Racewalk ====
28 athletes

Pos	Athlete	Birthdate	Country	Result
1st place, gold medalist(s)	Ray Sharp	25-Nov-1959	United States	47:49
2nd place, silver medalist(s)	Adolfo Garcia Marin	01-Feb-1963	Spain	50:38
3rd place, bronze medalist(s)	Sergio Antonio Gutierrez Brenes	07-Jul-1961	Costa Rica	51:00

==== M60 10 km road Racewalk ====
30 athletes

Pos	Athlete	Birthdate	Country	Result
1st place, gold medalist(s)	Adan Mendez Montiel	27-Jan-1958	Mexico	52:33
2nd place, silver medalist(s)	Anatoliy Gorshkov	04-Aug-1958	Ukraine	53:21
3rd place, bronze medalist(s)	Colin Heywood	08-Jul-1954	Australia	54:58

==== M65 10 km road Racewalk ====
36 athletes

Pos	Athlete	Birthdate	Country	Result
1st place, gold medalist(s)	Ignacio Melo Valls	28-Dec-1952	Spain	53:31
2nd place, silver medalist(s)	Patrice Brochot	03-Aug-1951	France	53:49
3rd place, bronze medalist(s)	Jose Luis Lopez Camarena	24-Sep-1949	Mexico	54:23

==== M70 10 km road Racewalk ====
37 athletes

Pos	Athlete	Birthdate	Country	Result
1st place, gold medalist(s)	Ian Richards	12-Apr-1948	Great Britain	54:08
2nd place, silver medalist(s)	Ettorino Formentin	22-Mar-1947	Italy	58:02
3rd place, bronze medalist(s)	Norman Frable	08-Aug-1947	United States	1h01:28

==== M75 10 km road Racewalk ====
22 athletes

Pos	Athlete	Birthdate	Country	Result
1st place, gold medalist(s)	Ralph Bennett	26-Dec-1941	Australia	1h04:28
2nd place, silver medalist(s)	Peter Schumm	28-Oct-1942	Germany	1h06:17
3rd place, bronze medalist(s)	Vladimir Kansky	18-Jan-1940	Czech Republic	1h06:29

==== M80 10 km road Racewalk ====
10 athletes

Pos	Athlete	Birthdate	Country	Result
1st place, gold medalist(s)	Romolo Pelliccia	19-Sep-1936	Italy	1h03:12
2nd place, silver medalist(s)	Alexis Jordana	10-Feb-1937	France	1h10:37
3rd place, bronze medalist(s)	Mykola Panaseiko	20-Dec-1934	Ukraine	1h11:25

==== M85 10 km road Racewalk ====
Pos	Athlete	Birthdate	Country	Result
1st place, gold medalist(s)	Ivan Pushkin	30-Jun-1930	Ukraine	1h18:45
2nd place, silver medalist(s)	Colin Silcock-Delaney	13-Oct-1932	Australia	1h20:07
3rd place, bronze medalist(s)	Sergio Augusto Michel Paoli	13-Nov-1930	Dominican Republic	1h21:15

==== M90 10 km road Racewalk ====
Pos	Athlete	Birthdate	Country	Result
1st place, gold medalist(s)	John Starr	27-Jul-1928	United States	1h20:29
2nd place, silver medalist(s)	Sriramulu Vallabhajosyula	12-May-1924	India	1h27:24

=== 20 km road Racewalk ===
Held September 15, 2018

==== M35 20 km road Racewalk ====
7 athletes

Pos	Athlete	Birthdate	Country	Result
1st place, gold medalist(s)	Dominic King	30-May-1983	Great Britain	1h35:04
2nd place, silver medalist(s)	Andreas Janker	13-Mar-1983	Germany	1h39:33
3rd place, bronze medalist(s)	Marcos Monterrubio Fernandez	15-Jan-1981	Spain	1h41:12

==== M40 20 km road Racewalk ====
17 athletes

Pos	Athlete	Birthdate	Country	Result
1st place, gold medalist(s)	Rick Liesting	18-Jul-1977	Netherlands	1h35:33
2nd place, silver medalist(s)	Stephane Poirout	16-Apr-1976	France	1h39:42
3rd place, bronze medalist(s)	Martin Nedvidek	25-Jan-1975	Czech Republic	1h41:33

==== M45 20 km road Racewalk ====
19 athletes

Pos	Athlete	Birthdate	Country	Result
1st place, gold medalist(s)	Alex Florez Studer	11-May -1971	Switzerland	1h40:28
2nd place, silver medalist(s)	Juan Antonio Porras Hidalgo	19-Feb-1972	Spain	1h40:34
3rd place, bronze medalist(s)	Dmitry Babenko	04-Jan-1973	Canada	1h40:36

==== M50 20 km road Racewalk ====
29 athletes

Pos	Athlete	Birthdate	Country	Result
1st place, gold medalist(s)	Miguel Angel Carvajal Ortega	14-Jul-1965	Spain	1h39:53
2nd place, silver medalist(s)	Leonardo Toro Lopez	07-May-1967	Spain	1h42:23
3rd place, bronze medalist(s)	Rodrigo Moreno	29-Apr-1966	Colombia	1h43:05

==== M55 20 km road Racewalk ====
28 athletes

Pos	Athlete	Birthdate	Country	Result
1st place, gold medalist(s)	Ray Sharp	25-Nov-1959	United States	1h44:36
2nd place, silver medalist(s)	Miguel Periáñez García	02-Nov-1962	Spain	1h45:50
3rd place, bronze medalist(s)	Sergio Antonio Gutierrez Brenes	07-Jul-1961	Costa Rica	1h48:13

==== M60 20 km road Racewalk ====
21 athletes

Pos	Athlete	Birthdate	Country	Result
1st place, gold medalist(s)	Adan Mendez Montiel	27-Jan-1958	Mexico	1h53:57
2nd place, silver medalist(s)	Colin Heywood	08-Jul-1954	Australia	1h55:33
3rd place, bronze medalist(s)	Rosario Gallo	29-Aug-1958	Italy	1h57:11

==== M65 20 km road Racewalk ====
29 athletes

Pos	Athlete	Birthdate	Country	Result
1st place, gold medalist(s)	Jose Luis Lopez Camarena	24-Sep-1949	Mexico	1h51:45
2nd place, silver medalist(s)	Patrice Brochot	03-Aug-1951	France	1h52:13
3rd place, bronze medalist(s)	Ignacio Melo Valls	28-Dec-1952	Spain	1h55:23

==== M70 20 km road Racewalk ====
20 athletes

Pos	Athlete	Birthdate	Country	Result
1st place, gold medalist(s)	Ian Richards	12-Apr-1948	Great Britain	1h55:00
2nd place, silver medalist(s)	Ettorino Formentin	22-Mar-1947	Italy	2h02:33
3rd place, bronze medalist(s)	Tom Dooley	09-Dec-1945	United States	2h10:02

==== M75 20 km road Racewalk ====
11 athletes

Pos	Athlete	Birthdate	Country	Result
1st place, gold medalist(s)	Peter Schumm	28-Oct-1942	Germany	2h15:26
2nd place, silver medalist(s)	Vladimir Kansky	18-Jan-1940	Czech Republic	2h21:57
3rd place, bronze medalist(s)	Marcel Jobin	03-Jan-1942	Canada	2h22:51

==== M80 20 km road Racewalk ====
7 athletes

Pos	Athlete	Birthdate	Country	Result
1st place, gold medalist(s)	Alexis Jordana	10-Feb-1937	France	2h29:54
2nd place, silver medalist(s)	Mykola Panaseiko	20-Dec-1934	Ukraine	2h33:01
3rd place, bronze medalist(s)	Thomas Jim Seymon	13-Oct-1937	Australia	2h47:45

==== M85 20 km road Racewalk ====
Pos	Athlete	Birthdate	Country	Result
1st place, gold medalist(s)	Ivan Pushkin	30-Jun-1930	Ukraine	2h43:42
2nd place, silver medalist(s)	Sergio Augusto Michel Paoli	13-Nov-1930	Dominican Republic	2h56:50

== See also ==
- 2018 World Masters Athletics Championships Women
