= List of centenarian masters track and field records =

In the sport of track and field, centenarians compete in the M100 & M105 (men) or W100 (women) age categories of masters athletics. The world records for this age group are ratified by World Masters Athletics, the global sports body for masters track and field. National bodies, such as the USA Masters division of USATF, may also retain national records for the best performances in athletics events recorded by athletes aged 100 and over. In addition, competition-specific records for centenarians are retained for major events, such as World Masters Athletics Championships, World Masters Indoor Athletics Championships, USATF Masters Outdoor Championships, USATF Masters Indoor Championships, and the Senior Games.

Given the small number of people competing in sport at that age, the first time a centenarian masters track and field record was officially listed was in the April 1999 National Masters News issue, and the Spring 1999 Veteran Athletics magazine issue. The first officially approved mark was Ben Levinson's (age 103) 1998 shot put record that was approved by the WAVA (World) Records committee on 1 January 1999 and the USA Masters Record committee on 4 December 1998.

== World records ==
Status	Age group	In or Out	Event	Mark	Athlete	Nationality	Age	Date	Location	Ref.
Current	M 105	Outdoor	100 Meter	34.50 (+0.1 m/s)	Stanisław Kowalski	Poland	105	27 June 2015	Torun, Poland	
Current	M 105	Outdoor	Shot Put (3 kg)	3.25	Hidekichi Miyazaki	Japan	105	23 September 2015	Kyoto, Japan	
Not Ratified	M 105	Outdoor	Shot Put (3 kg)	4.27	Stanisław Kowalski	Poland	105	28 June 2015	Torun, Poland	
Current	M 105	Outdoor	Discus (1.0 kg)	7.50	Stanisław Kowalski	Poland	105	27 June 2015	Torun, Poland	
Current	M 100	Outdoor	100 m	26.74 (+2.0 m/s)	Toshio Kamehama	Japan	100	2 November 2025	Okinawa, Japan	
Current	M 100	Outdoor	200 Meter	1:17.59	Philip Rabinowitz	South Africa	100	17 December 2004	Cape Town, South Africa	
Current	M 100	Outdoor	400 Meter	3:41.00	Erwin Jaskulski	Austria	100	13 March 2003	San Sebastian, Spain	
Not Ratified	M 100	Outdoor	800 Meter	8:19.58	William Finch	United States	100	27 September 2012	Cary, NC, United States	
Current	M 100	Outdoor	1500 Meter	16:46.41	Leslie Amey	Australia	100	1 April 2000	Brisbane, Australia	
Current	M 100	Outdoor	High Jump	0.90	Donald Pellmann	United States	100	20 September 2015	San Diego, CA	
Current	M 100	Outdoor	Long Jump	1.78 (±0.0 m/s)	Donald Pellmann	United States	100	20 September 2015	San Diego, CA	
Current	M 100	Outdoor	Triple Jump	3.52 (+1.7 m/s)	Giuseppe Ottaviani	Italy	100	8 July 2016	Arezzo, Italy	
Current	M 100	Outdoor	Shot Put (3 kg)	6.56	Donald Pellmann	United States	100	20 September 2015	San Diego, CA	
Current	M 100	Outdoor	Discus (1.0 kg)	14.86	Donald Pellmann	United States	100	20 September 2015	San Diego, CA	
Current	M 100	Outdoor	Hammer (3 kg)	11.32	Trent Lane	United States	101	21 June 2011	Humble, United States	
Current	M 100	Outdoor	Javelin (400 g)	12.42	Takashi Shimokawara	Japan	101	26 October 2007	Iwate, Japan	
Current	M 100	Outdoor	Weight Throw (5.45 kg)	4.21	Giuseppe Ottaviani	Italy	101	20 May 2017	Fano, Italy	
Not Ratified	M 100	Outdoor	Weight Throw (5.45 kg)	4.92	Giuseppe Ottaviani	Italy	100	30 May 2016	Italy	
Current	M 100	Outdoor	Throws Pentathlon	2533	Giuseppe Ottaviani	Italy	101	20 May 2017	Fano, Italy	
Not Ratified	M 100	Outdoor	Throws Pentathlon	3344	Trent Lane	United States	100	1 October 2010		
Current	W 100	Outdoor	100 Meter	39.62 (+0.2 m/s)	Julia Hawkins	United States	101	10 June 2017	Birmingham, Alabama	
Not ratified	W 100	Outdoor	100 Meter	36.71 (−1.6 m/s)	Diane Friedman	United States	100	15 Aug 2021	Rochester, MI	
Not Ratified	W 100	Outdoor	200 Meter	3:01.61 (+0.2 m/s)	Man Kaur	India & Canada	103	4 Dec 2019	Malaysia	
Current	W 100	Outdoor	200 Meter	1:29.79 (−0.5 m/s)	Diane Friedman	United States	100	15 Aug 2021	Rochester, MI	
Current	W 100	Outdoor	Shot Put (2 kg)	4.10	Ruth Frith	Australia	100	22 August 2010	Southport, Australia	
Current	W 100	Outdoor	Discus (0.75 kg)	9.30	Ruth Frith	Australia	101	2 April 2011	Brisbane, Australia	
Current	W 100	Outdoor	Hammer (2 kg)	11.30	Ruth Frith	Australia	101	10 October 2010	Turner, Australia	
Current	W 100	Outdoor	Javelin (400 g)	6.43	Ruth Frith	Australia	100	23 August 2009	Southport, Australia	
Current	W 100	Outdoor	Weight Throw (4 kg)	4.68	Ruth Frith	Australia	101	2 April 2011	Brisbane, Australia	
Current	W 100	Outdoor	Throws Pentathlon	3832	Ruth Frith	Australia	101	2 April 2011	Brisbane, Australia	
Current	M 100	Indoor	60 Meter	17.52	Giuseppe Ottaviani	Italy	100	20 May 2016	Ancona, Italy	
Current	M 100	Indoor	200 Meter	1:40.94	Orville Rogers	United States	100	18 March 2018	Landover, MD	
Current	M 100	Indoor	400 Meter	4:16.90	Orville Rogers	United States	100	16 March 2018	Landover, MD	
Current	M 100	Indoor	800 Meter	9:56.44	Orville Rogers	United States	100	18 March 2018	Landover, MD	
Current	M 100	Indoor	1500 Meter	20:00.91	Orville Rogers	United States	100	17 March 2018	Landover, MD	
Current	M 100	Indoor	Long Jump	1.16	Giuseppe Ottaviani	Italy	100	25 February 2017	Ancona, Italy	
Current	M 100	Indoor	Triple Jump	2.18	Giuseppe Ottaviani	Italy	101	21 March 2018	Madrid, Spain	
Current	M 100	Indoor	Shot Put (3 kg)	4.43	Giuseppe Ottaviani	Italy	100	20 May 2016	Ancona, Italy	
Current	M 100	Indoor	Weight Throw (5.45)	5.10	Everett Hosack	United States	100	22 March 2002	Boston, MA	
Current	W 100	Indoor	60 Meter	24.79	Julia Hawkins	United States	102	17 March 2018	Landover, MD	
Current	W 100	Indoor	Shot Put (2 kg)	2.77	Julia Hawkins	United States	102	17 March 2018	Landover, MD	
Not Ratified	W 100	Indoor	Shot Put	3.45 m (11 ft 3 3/4 in)	Margaret White	United States	100	29 January 1995	Oklahoma City, OK	
Current	W 105	Outdoor	100 Meter	1:02.95 (+1.3 m/s)	Julia Hawkins	United States	105	Jun 11, 2021	Hammond, Louisiana	

== American records ==
Status	Age group	In or Out	Event	Mark	Athlete	Age	Date	Location	Ref.
Current	M 100	Outdoor	100 Meter	26.99	Donald Pellmann	100	20 September 2015	San Diego, CA	
Current	M 100	Outdoor	200 Meter	2:02.37	Orville Rogers	100	29 July 2018	Cheney, WA	
Current	M 100	Outdoor	400 Meter	5:07.26	Orville Rogers	100	27 July 2018	Cheney, WA	
Current	M 100	Outdoor	High Jump	0.90	Donald Pellmann	100	20 September 2015	San Diego, CA	
Current	M 100	Outdoor	Long Jump	1.78	Donald Pellmann	100	20 September 2015	San Diego, CA	
Current	M 100	Outdoor	Shot Put (3 kg)	6.56	Donald Pellmann	100	20 September 2015	San Diego, CA	
Current	M 100	Outdoor	Discus (1.0 kg)	14.86	Donald Pellmann	100	20 September 2015	San Diego, CA	
Current	M 100	Outdoor	Hammer Throw (3 kg)	11.32	Trent Lane	101	21 June 2011	Humble, TX	
Current	M 100	Outdoor	Javelin (400 g)	8.47	Trent Lane	101	24 June 2011	Humble, TX	
Current	W 100	Outdoor	100 Meter	39.62	Julia Hawkins	101	10 June 2017	Birmingham, AL	
Current	W 105	Outdoor	100 Meter	1:02.95	Julia Hawkins	105	6 Nov 2017	Hammond, LA	
Current	W 100	Outdoor	200 Meter	1:29.79 (−0.5 m/s)	Diane Friedman	100	15 Aug 2021	Rochester, MI	
Current	M 100	Indoor	60 Meter	19.13	Orville Rogers	100	17 March 2018	Landover, MD	
Current	M 100	Indoor	200 Meter	1:40.94	Orville Rogers	100	18 March 2018	Landover, MD	
Current	M 100	Indoor	400 Meter	4:16.90	Orville Rogers	100	16 March 2018	Landover, MD	
Current	M 100	Indoor	800 Meter	9:56.44	Orville Rogers	100	18 March 2018	Landover, MD	
Current	M 100	Indoor	1500 Meter	20:00.91	Orville Rogers	100	17 March 2018	Landover, MD	
Current	M 100	Indoor	Shot Put (4 kg)	3.66	Everett Hosack	100	16 March 2002	Berea, OH	
Current	M 100	Indoor	Weight Throw (12#)	5.10	Everett Hosack	100	22 March 2002	Boston, MA	
Current	M 100	Indoor	SWT (35#)	2.21	Everett Hosack	100	24 March 2002	Boston, MA	
Current	W 100	Indoor	60 Meter	24.79	Julia Hawkins	102	17 March 2018	Landover, MD	
Current	W 100	Indoor	Shot Put (2 kg)	2.77	Julia Hawkins	102	17 March 2018	Landover, MD	
Current	W 100	Outdoor	JT	6.25	Diana Friedman	100	15 August 2021	Rochester, MI	
Pending	W 100	Outdoor	LJ	0.51	Fay Bond	101	28 July 2025	Ames, IA	
Pending	W 100	Outdoor	SP (2 kg)	1.93	Fay Bond	101	28 July 2025	Ames, IA	
Pending	W 100	Outdoor	DT (0.75 kg)	4.33	Fay Bond	101	28 July 2025	Ames, IA	

=== Former American records ===
Status	Age group	In or Out	Event	Mark	Athlete	Age	Date	Location	Ref.
Unofficial (Senior Games)	M 100	Outdoor	50 Meter	18.19	Frederick Winter	100	July 2015	Minneapolis, MN	
Former	M 100	Outdoor	100 Meter	39.97	Waldo McBurney	100	5 July 2003	Carolina, Puerto Rico	
Former	M 100	Outdoor	100 Meter	43.00	Everett Hosack	100	27 February 2002		
Former	M 100	Outdoor	Shot Put (4 kg)	4.12	Waldo McBurney	100	4 July 2003	Carolina, Puerto Rico	
Former	M 100	Outdoor	Shot Put (4 kg)	3.69	Everett Hosack	100	30 June 2002		
Former	M 100	Outdoor	Shot Put	3.11	John Whittemore	100	11 February 2000	Santa Barbara, CA	
Former	M 100	Outdoor	Shot Put	3.07	Ben Levinson	103	11 August 1998	Eugene, OR	
Not Ratified	M 100	Outdoor	Shot Put	3.16	Tom Lane	100	10 September 1994	Cal Senior Games. San Diego, CA	
Former	M 100	Outdoor	Discus (1.0 kg)	8.91	Everett Hosack	100	1 June 2002		
Former	M 100	Outdoor	Discus (1.0 kg)	7.36	John Whittemore	100	11 February 2000	Santa Barbara, CA	
Not Ratified	M 100	Outdoor	Discus	8.38	Tom Lane	100	10 September 1994	Cal Senior Games. San Diego, CA	
Former	M 100	Outdoor	Hammer Throw (4 kg)	8.86	Everett Hosack	100	30 February 2002		
Former	M 100	Outdoor	Javelin (400 g)	5.98	John Whittemore	100	7 October 2000	Santa Barbara, CA	
Not Ratified	M 100	Outdoor	Javelin	6.40	John Whittemore	100	11 February 2000	Santa Barbara, CA	
Not Ratified	M 100	Outdoor	Javelin	7.98	Tom Lane	100	10 Sep 1994	Cal Senior Games. San Diego, CA	
Unofficial	M 100	Outdoor	Throws Pentathlon	3344 points	Trent Lane	100	1 October 2010	Lafayette, LA	
Unofficial	M 100	Outdoor	Weight Throw (5.45 kg)	4.47	Trent Lane	100	1–2 October 2010	Lafayette, LA	
Unofficial (Senior Games)	W 100	Outdoor	50 Meter	18.31 (+0.4 m/s)	Julia Hawkins	100	6–11 June 2017	Birmingham, AL	
Replaced by Superior Mark	W 100	Outdoor	100 Meter	1:17.33 (+1.4 m/s)	Ida Keeling	100	30 April 2016	Penn Relays	
Not Ratified	W 100	Outdoor	Shot Put (3 kg)	3.94	Margaret White	100	30 July 1994		
Not Ratified	W 100	Outdoor	Discus Throw	6.65	Margaret White	100	1994		
Not Ratified	W 100	Outdoor	Discus Throw (1.0 kg)	6.34	Margaret White	100	30 July 1994		
Former	M 100	Indoor	60 Meter	27.29	Everett Hosack	100	23 March 2002	Boston, MA	
Former	M 100	Indoor	200 Meter	2:22.81	Everett Hosack	100	16 March 2002	Berea, OH	
Replaced by Superior Mark	W 100	Indoor	60 Meter	58.34	Ida Keeling	102	24 February 2018	New York City, NY	
Not Ratified	W 100	Indoor	Shot Put	3.45 m (11 ft 3 3/4 in)	Margaret White	100	29 January 1995	Oklahoma City, OK	

== See also ==
- List of world records in masters athletics
