= List of masters athletes =

This is a list of notable people who have participated in masters athletics. Most have achieved their primary notability through athletic endeavors except when noted.

- Luciano Acquarone Italy
- Aimo Aho Finland
- Gabriela Andersen-Schiess Switzerland
- Henry Andrade United States Cape Verde
- Birger Asplund Sweden
- Doris Auer Austria
- Charles Austin United States
- Rink Babka United States
- Lee Baca United States Los Angeles County Sheriff
- Bob Backus United States
- Thane Baker United States
- Willie Banks United States
- Arthur Barnard United States
- James Barrineau United States
- Jack Bacheler United States
- Dieter Baumann Germany
- Tim Berrett Canada
- Nataša Bezjak Slovenia
- Laurie Binder United States
- Chris Black United Kingdom
- Peter Blank Germany
- Meeri Bodelid Sweden
- Viktor Bolshov Russia Soviet Union
- Charlie Booth Australia inventor of Starting Blocks
- Lamberto Boranga Italy
- Christa Bortignon Canada
- Mary Bowermaster United States
- Roald Bradstock United States United Kingdom Artist
- Norman Bright United States
- Debbie Brill Canada
- Benny Brown United States
- Arto Bryggare Finland
- Zola Budd South Africa
- Ed Burke United States
- Billie Ann Burrill United States
- Rich Busa United States
- Arild Busterud Norway
- Tom Byers United States
- John Carlos United States
- Gary Carlsen United States
- Angelo Carosi Italy
- David Carr Australia
- Ed Caruthers United States
- Dwain Chambers United Kingdom
- Harold Chapson United States
- Yelizaveta Chernyshova Russia Soviet Union
- Lydia Cheromei Kenya
- Rosemary Chrimes United Kingdom
- Todd Christensen United States American Football
- Dick Cochran United States
- Eamonn Coghlan Ireland
- Leon Coleman United States
- Bill Collins United States
- Phil Conley United States
- Harold Connolly United States
- Ted Corbitt United States
- Bill Cosby United States Comedian
- Alan Cranston United States U.S. Senator
- Josh Culbreath United States
- Toshiko D'Elia United States
- Maria Pia D'Orlando Italy
- Tamara Danilova Russia Soviet Union
- Jeanne Daprano United States
- Willie Davenport United States
- Gerry Davidson United States
- Mary Decker-Slaney United States
- Colleen De Reuck United States South Africa
- Maureen de St. Croix Canada
- Elliott Denman United States
- Ken Dennis United States
- Ángel Díaz Guatemala
- Grace-Ann Dinkins Liberia United States also Trauma Surgeon
- Rod Dixon New Zealand
- Walter Dix United States
- Fabrizio Donato Italy
- Anthony Dorsett United States American Football
- Aleksandr Dryhol Ukraine Soviet Union
- Charles Dumas United States
- Ludmila Engquist Sweden Russia Soviet Union
- Andrés Espinosa Mexico
- Saskia Estupinan Ecuador Public Health Doctor
- Laverne Eve Bahamas
- Lee Evans (sprinter) United States
- Mohamed Ezzher France
- Earl Fee Canada
- Nuria Fernández Spain
- Maria Magnólia Figueiredo Brazil
- Frederico Fischer Brazil
- Dick Fosbury United States
- Jack Foster New Zealand
- Ruth Frith Australia Centenarian, world's oldest female athlete
- Gabre Gabric Italy Centenarian
- Tom Gage United States
- Willie Gault United States also American Football Player
- Fortune Gordien United States
- Miki Gorman United States
- Ivy Granstrom Canada
- Dalton Grant United Kingdom
- Johnny Gray United States Oct 2000 Ran Masters Mile (Run For Children) as a M40. Holds Masters M35 Record achieved as an Open competitor
- Norm Green United States
- Jack Greenwood United States
- Jim Grelle United States
- Viktor Gruzenkin Russia
- Albert Hall (athlete) United States
- Kozo Haraguchi Japan
- Eddie Hart United States
- Alisa Harvey-Hill United States
- Larry Hart (athlete) United States
- Dawn Hartigan Australia
- Rex Harvey United States also Official and Administrator
- Ray Hatton United States Born in United Kingdom
- Robert Hecker United States Musician
- Bud Held United States also Inventor and Entrepreneur
- James Chico Hernandez United States Wrestler
- Hal Higdon United States also Sports Writer
- Ron Hill United Kingdom
- Jim Hines United States
- Russ Hodge United States
- Maurice Houvion France
- Bob Humphreys United States
- Guy Husson France
- Ayanna Hutchinson Trinidad and Tobago
- Hubert Indra Italy
- Rıza Maksut İşman Turkey
- Ivan Ivančić Yugoslavia Bosnia and Herzegovina Croatia
- April Jace United States Celebrity murder victim
- Regina Jacobs United States
- Kip Janvrin United States
- Erwin Jaskulski Austria Centenarian
- Billy Johnson United States American Football player
- Tebbs Lloyd Johnson United Kingdom
- Payton Jordan United States
- Monica Joyce United States Ireland United Kingdom
- Regina Joyce United States Olympian for Ireland United Kingdom
- Al Joyner United States
- Gitte Karlshøj Denmark
- Dimitrios Kattis Greece
- Ryszard Katus Poland
- Ida Keeling United States Centenarian
- Johnny Kelley United States
- Patrick C. Kennell United States Academic
- John Keston United States British actor
- Ray Kimble United States
- James King United States
- Roger Kingdom United States
- Mark Kiptoo Kenya
- Herb Kirk United States World's oldest runner
- Wolfgang Knabe Germany
- Peter Koech Kenya
- Mariya Konovalova Russia
- Olga Kotelko Canada
- Galina Kovalenskaya Russia
- Stanisław Kowalski Poland Centenarian, world's oldest athlete
- June Krauser United States "Mother of Masters swimming"
- Marty Krulee United States
- Shaul Ladany Israel
- Ron Laird United States
- Francie Larrieu-Smith United States
- Bev LaVeck United States
- Evelyn Lawler United States Mother of Carl Lewis and Carol Lewis
- Fred Lebow United States New York Marathon event director
- Nicole Lévêque France
- Gerry Lindgren United States
- James Lofton United States also Hall of Fame American Football player
- Jud Logan United States
- Mihaela Loghin Romania
- Mario Longo Italy
- Arne Lothe Norway
- Horst Mandl Austria
- Mike Manley United States
- Pat Manson United States
- José Marín Spain
- Marsha Mark-Baird Trinidad and Tobago
- Peter Marsh United Kingdom Academic, sociologist
- John Martel United States Lawyer and novelist
- Marie Mathieu Puerto Rico
- Ralph Maxwell United States Judge
- Bill McChesney United States
- Phil McConkey United States American Football player
- Anne McKenzie South Africa
- James McNamara Ireland
- Leland McPhie United States Centenarian
- Delano Meriwether United States also physician
- E. Gerald Meyer United States Centenarian
- Marie-Louise Michelsohn United States Mathematician
- Alain Mimoun France
- Victoria Mitchell Australia
- Hidekichi Miyazaki Japan Centenarian
- Felicia Țilea-Moldovan Romania Spain
- Martín Mondragón Mexico
- David Moorcroft United Kingdom
- Boo Morcom United States
- Carol Moseke (Frost) USA
- Sylvia Mosqueda United States
- Phil Mulkey United States
- Kenneth Mungara Kenya
- Fabiana MurerBrazil
- Sandra Myers Spain
- Iryna Mykhalchenko Ukraine
- Larry Myricks United States
- Fidelis Ndyabagye Uganda
- Nick Newton United States Inventor
- Jamie Nieto United States
- Doug Nordquist United States
- Gary Null United States Author/Pundit
- Nadine O'Connor United States
- Irene Obera United States
- Al Oerter United States
- Vera Olenchenko Russia Uzbekistan Soviet Union
- Brian Oldfield United States Competed at a June 1978 Masters Meet. Holds two Masters World Records
- Marcus O'Sullivan Ireland
- Giuseppe Ottaviani (athlete) Italian
- Evy Palm Sweden
- Ladislav Pataki United States
- Dodyu Patarinski Bulgaria
- Tom Patsalis United States
- Donald Pellmann United States Centenarian
- Elisabetta Perrone Italy
- Steve Peters United Kingdom Sports psychiatrist
- Lyudmila Petrova Russia
- Florence Picaut France
- Dmitry Pietrman United States Ukraine Futbol/Soccer club owner
- Simon Poelman New Zealand
- Valbjörn Þorláksson Iceland
- Bernardine Portenski New Zealand
- Patricia Porter United States
- Caroline Powell United Kingdom
- Tatyana Pozdnyakova Soviet Union Ukraine
- Alfred Proksch Austria
- Philip Rabinowitz South Africa Centenarian
- Carmelo Rado Italy
- Philipa Raschker United States
- Lucien Rault France
- Pam Reed United States
- Marian Shields Robinson United States Mother of current U.S. First Lady
- Bill Rodgers United States
- Gaston Roelants Belgium
- Orville Rogers United States Centenarian
- Henry Rono Kenya
- Nick Rose United Kingdom
- Anne Chatrine Rühlow Germany
- Jim Ryun United States also U.S. Congressman
- Joan Benoit Samuelson United States
- Ugo Sansonetti Italy
- Enrico Saraceni Italy
- Willi Sawall Australia
- Silke Schmidt Germany
- Bob Schul United States
- Steve Scott United States
- Helen Searle Australia
- Yuriy Sedykh Russia
- Marco Segatel Italy
- Iryna Sekachova Ukraine
- Vyacheslav Shabunin Russia
- Nolan Shaheed United States Jazz trumpeter
- George A. Sheehan United States Running writer
- Frank Shorter United States
- Zdeňka Šilhavá Czech Republic
- Jay Silvester United States
- Fauja Singh United Kingdom India
- Chuck Smead United States
- Joyce Smith United Kingdom
- Karl Smith Jamaica
- Marjorie Parker Smith United States Dancer/Figure skater
- Peter Snell New Zealand
- Jim Sorensen United States
- Fred Sowerby United States Netherlands Antilles
- Mattias Sunneborn Sweden
- Paul Spangler United States
- Sasha Springer-Jones Trinidad and Tobago
- Walt Stack United States
- Kjell-Erik Ståhl Sweden
- Brian Stanton United States
- Rudolf Steiner Switzerland
- Gary Stenlund United States
- Dwight Stones United States
- Ed Stotsenberg United States Philanthropist
- Larry Stuart United States
- Jüri Tamm Estonia
- Tatyana Ter-Mesrobyan Russia
- Valbjörn Þorláksson Iceland
- Domingo Tibaduiza Colombia
- Milan Tiff United States
- Felicia Țilea-Moldovan Romania
- Bogdan Tudor Romania
- Derek Turnbull New Zealand
- Gary Tuttle United States
- Teresa Vaill United States
- Martti Vainio Finland
- Venelina Veneva-Mateeva Bulgaria
- Sandro Viana Brazil
- Sean Wade United States New Zealand
- Bill Wambach United States
- Cornelius "Dutch" Warmerdam United States
- Sylvia Weiner Canada Poland
- Priscilla Welch United Kingdom
- Georg Werthner Austria
- Anthony Whiteman United Kingdom
- Ed Whitlock Canada
- Ron Whitney United States
- John Whittemore United States World's oldest athlete
- Novlene Williams-Mills Jamaica
- Gerhard Windolf Germany
- Ruth Wysocki United States
- Iryna Yatchenko Belarus
- Dimitrion Yordanidis Greece
- Emmerich Zensch Austria

== Open Athletes ==
These are athletes who have not competed as a Masters athlete, but by age qualify for and hold Masters records set in elite open level competition.

- Yamilé Aldama Cuba Sudan United Kingdom Holds Masters W35 and W40 Record achieved as an Open competitor
- Virgilijus Alekna Lithuania Holds Masters M35 Record achieved as an Open competitor
- Igor Astapkovich Belarus has not competed in a Masters event but holds two Masters World Records
- Inha Babakova Ukraine Holds Masters W35 Record achieved as an Open competitor
- Abdellah Béhar France Holds Masters M35 Record achieved as an Open competitor
- Mike Boit Kenya Holds Masters M35 Record achieved as an Open competitor
- Sabine Braun Germany Holds Masters W35 Record achieved as an Open competitor
- Chris Brown Bahamas Holds Masters M35 Record achieved as an Open competitor
- Amber Campbell United States Holds Masters W35 Record achieved as an Open competitor
- Linford Christie United Kingdom Holds Masters M35 Record achieved as an Open competitor
- Jearl Miles Clark United States Holds Masters W35 Record achieved as an Open competitor
- Kim Collins Saint Kitts and Nevis Holds pending Masters M35 Record achieved as an Open competitor
- Maurizio Damilano Italy Holds Masters M35 Record achieved as an Open competitor
- Yohann Diniz France Has multiple pending Masters records
- Troy Douglas Netherlands has not competed in a Masters event but holds two Masters World Records
- Joanne Dow United States Holds Masters W40 and W45 Records achieved as an Open competitor
- Stacy Dragila United States Holds Masters W35 Record achieved as an Open competitor
- Heike Drechsler Germany Holds Masters W35 Record achieved as an Open competitor
- Jonathan Edwards United Kingdom Holds Masters M35 Record achieved as an Open competitor
- Ludmila Engquist Sweden Holds Masters W35 Record achieved as an Open competitor
- Haile Gebrselassie Ethiopia Holds Masters M35 Record achieved as an Open competitor
- Lyubov Gurina Russia Holds Masters W35 Record achieved as an Open competitor
- Alvin Harrison United States Dominican Republic Holds a pending Masters M35 Record achieved as an Open competitor
- Jeff Hartwig United States Holds Masters M35 Record achieved as an Open competitor
- Colin Jackson United Kingdom Held Masters M35 Record achieved as an Open competitor
- Allen Johnson United States Holds Masters M35 Record achieved as an Open competitor, set while winning IAAF World Cup
- Meb Keflezighi United States American M40 Marathon record holder, ran in 2016 Olympics at age 41
- Mary Jepkosgei Keitany Kenya Pending marathon record set as open competitor
- Robert Korzeniowski Poland Holds Masters M35 Record achieved as an Open competitor
- Inessa Kravets Ukraine Holds Masters W35 Record achieved as an Open competitor
- Olga Kuzenkova Russia Holds Masters W35 Record achieved as an Open competitor
- A. G. Kruger United States Holds Masters M35 Record in Throws Pentathlon as Open competitor
- Bernard Lagat United States Holds multiple Masters M35 Records achieved as an Open competitor
- Carl Lewis United States Holds Masters M35 Record achieved as an Open competitor
- Lev Lobodin Russia Holds Masters M35 Record achieved as an Open competitor
- Carlos Lopes Portugal Holds Masters M35 Record achieved as an Open competitor
- Edith Masai Kenya Holds Masters W35 Record achieved as an Open competitor
- Josef Matoušek Czech Republic Czechoslovakia Set M35 Javelin record en route to 1960 Olympics
- Danny McFarlane Jamaica Holds Masters M35 Record achieved as an Open competitor
- Faina Melnik Soviet Union Holds Masters W35 Record achieved as an Open competitor
- Irina Mikitenko Germany Holds Masters M35 Record achieved as an Open competitor
- Kathryn Mitchell Australia Holds Masters W35 Record achieved as an Open competitor
- Steffi Nerius Germany Held Masters W35 Record achieved as an Open competitor
- Merlene Ottey Slovenia has not competed in a Masters event but holds several Masters World Records
- Björn Otto Germany Holds Masters W35 Record achieved as an Open competitor
- Joanne Pavey United Kingdom Holds multiple Masters Records achieved as an Open competitor
- Larisa Peleshenko Russia Holds Masters W35 Record achieved as an Open competitor
- Aurelia Pentón Cuba Holds Masters W35 Record achieved as an Open competitor
- Elisabetta Perrone Italy Holds Masters W35 Record achieved as an Open competitor
- Yekaterina Podkopayeva Russia has not competed in a Masters event but holds several Masters World Records
- Maricica Puică Romania has not competed in a Masters event but holds several Masters World Records
- Félix Sánchez Dominican Republic ran a superior time to M35 World record in the World Championships
- Kerry Saxby-Junna Australia Holds Masters W35 Record achieved as an Open competitor
- Marina Stepanova Soviet Union Holds Masters W35 Record achieved as an Open competitor
- Jenn Suhr United States Holds Masters W35 Record achieved as an Open competitor
- William Tanui Kenya Ran a 1500m superior to the M35 record in Open competition
- Dragutin Topić Serbia Holds Masters M35 Record achieved as an Open competitor
- Kevin Toth Threw shot put further than M35 World Record just before being banned for doping
- Simon Vroemen Netherlands Holds Masters M35 Record achieved as an Open competitor
- Ibrahima Wade France Holds Masters M35 Record achieved as an Open competitor
- John Walker New Zealand Holds Masters M35 Record achieved as an Open competitor
- Jan Železný Czech Republic has not competed in a Masters event but holds two Masters World Records

== See also ==
- World Masters Athletics Championships
- Masters Athletics
- USATF Masters Outdoor Championships
- USATF Masters Indoor Championships
