= Masters M90 high jump world record progression =

This is the progression of world record improvements of the high jump M90 division of Masters athletics.

Key

Incomplete information Pending

Height	Athlete	Nationality	Birthdate	Location	Date
1.15	Donald Pellmann	United States	12.08.1915	Fort Collins	04.09.2005
1.10	Vic Younger	Australia	05.01.1912	Melbourne	08.10.2002
1.10	Kizo Kimura	Japan	11.07.1911	Matsue	19.05.2002
