= List of centenarian masters track and field athletes =

In the sport of athletics, centenarian competitors were recorded in the early 20th century, and have become increasingly common in the 21st century. This has occurred during a period of population ageing and increased longevity in wealthy countries, alongside a corresponding development of masters track and field competitions, such as the Senior Olympics and the World Masters Athletics Championships.

Stanisław Kowalski and Hidekichi Miyazaki at age 105 are two of the oldest centenarian masters track and field athletes. Orville Rogers (age 100) stated, “I love the thrill of preparation and training,” he told Runner’s World. “When I compete, I am not just running against the people out on the track at that moment, I am running against everyone who has run the event before me. That is gratifying to me.”

== List of centenarians track and field athletes ==
Athlete	Peak age	Peak year	Nationality	Division	Event(s)	Achievements	Ref.
Leslie Amey	101	2001	Australia	Men	Distance	Amey won gold at the 2001 World Championship in Brisbane	
Nihal Gil	101	2016	Canada	Men	Sprints	Gil competed at the 2016 inaugural Americas Masters Games.	
Sawang Janpram	102	2022	Thailand	Men	Sprints	Yahoo Sports states 102 years old running the 100 meter dash in a meet (26th Thailand Master Athletes Championship). Age needs to be verified.	
Erwin Jaskulski	100	2003	Austria/Ukraine/United States	Men	Sprints	Feb 2002 National Masters News: listed as an Austrian citizen living in Honolulu.	
Ilmari Koppinen	105	2023	Finland	Men	Field Events	DOB: Jan 8, 1918. Competed Jan 8, 2023 at the Ilmari Koppisen meet.	
Stanisław Kowalski	105	2016	Poland	Men	Sprints, Discus	June 2015 Kowalski (age 105) competed in a sprint race.	
Helge Lonnroth	100	2017	Finland	Men	Field	Lonnroth competed in the Javelin and Weight Throw at a meet in Finland July 2017.	
Hidekichi Miyazaki	105	2015	Japan	Men	Shot Put	23 Sept 2015 (one day after turning 105) Miyazaki competed in a sprint race.	
Giuseppe Ottaviani	103	2019	Italy	Men	Sprints, Field	Ottaviani competed in the Long Jump in a meet in Italy Sept 2019.	
Alfred Proksch	100	2009	Austria	Men	Field	Proksch competed at the 2009 World Masters Athletic Championships in the shot put and discus.	
Philip Rabinowitz	100	2005	South Africa	Men	Sprints and Racewalk	Rabinowitz competed in the racewalk in a Mar 2005 meet in RSA. On 10 July 2004, entered the Guinness Book of World Records as the fastest 100-year-old to ever run the 100 meters, with a time of 30.86 seconds	
Mario Riboni	100	2013	Italy	Men	Shot Put	Born 13 June 1913.	
Takashi Shimokawara	104	2010	Japan	Men	Javelin	Shimokawara competed in the discus Sept 2010 in Japan.	
Atter Singh Sekhon	102	2026	Canada	Men	Sprints and SP	Competed at the March 7-8, 2026 Canadian Masters Indoor Championship	
Fauja Singh	102	2013	India & Great Britain	Men	Marathon	Singh last competed at the 2013 Hong Kong Marathon.	
Ruth Frith	102	2012	Australia	Women	Field	Frith competed Feb 2012 in the Hammer at a meet in New Zealand.	
Elfriede Fuchs	100	2020	Austria	Women	Shot Put	Fuch competed in AUT on 19 or 20 Sept 2020. Fuch born 26 Aug 1920.	
Man Kaur	103	2019	India & Canada	Women	Sprints and Field	Kaur won gold at the 2017 World Masters Games in New Zealand. Kaur won gold in 200 m at 3:01.61 and SP at 2.21 at the Dec 2019 Asian Masters Championship in Malaysia. Man Kur was born 1 Mar 1916, and passed 31 July 2021 at age 105.	
Winnifred Newall	100	2023	Australia	Women	Sprints		
Florence Mary Storch	101	2014	Canada	Women	Javelin	Storch won gold at the 28 Aug 2014 Senior Games at Sherwood Park, Strathcona County, Canada. She was born 10 June 1913.	
Rambai	105	2022	India	Women	100 Meter	Listed in Masters Rankings: July 2022 India: National Open Masters Athletics Championship in Vadodara, India. Born 1917.	

=== American men and women ===
John Whittemore at age 104 is one of the oldest American centenarian men's masters track and field athlete. Julia Hawkins (age 105) competed in the 100 meter dash on Nov 6, 2021. The race was held at the Nov 6, 2021 Louisiana Senior Games at the Southeastern University’s track in Hammond, LA.

Numerous Centenarians have competed at the USATF Masters Outdoor Championships and the USATF Masters Indoor Championships. At the outdoor USA Championships, Orville Rogers (age 100 in 2018) and Julia "Hurricane" Hawkins (age 101 in 2017). At the indoor USA Championships Everett Hosack (ages 100 and 101) competed at the 2002 and 2003 meets, LeLand McPhie (age 100) at the 2014 meet, and Orville Rogers (100) and Julia “Hurricane” Hawkins (102) at the 2018 meet. As of 2020, no American centenarian have completed a combined event (decathlon or pentathlon).

The USATF (American) Centenarian Award is presented periodically to outstanding athletes 100 years old and above. In 2017 Julia Hawkins received the award.

Athlete	Peak age	Peak year	Nationality	Division	Event(s)	Achievements	Ref.
Arnold Bing	102	1993	United States	Men	Sprints	55 meter dash in 37.47 at indoor Minnesota meet on Jan 17, 1993. Masters age 102, "senior Olympics" age 103.	
Raymonde Brown	100	2023	United States	Men	Racewalk		
Russell Clark	103	2004	United States	Men	Sprints	50 & 200 Meter Dash Meet Record Huntsman Senior Games. 2004 Huntsman World Senior Games were held October. Born 19 Nov 1900.	
Roy Englert	100	2023	United States	Men	Distance		
William Finch	100	2012	United States	Men	Distance	Finch held state (North Carolina) Senior Games records in the 800 & 1500 meter runs (M90 & M95) and 1500 meter (M100).	
Jonathan Foulke	107	1925	United States	Men	Runner	24 Sept 1925 in Los Angeles, a centenarian runner Jonathan Foulke (107 years old) won a foot race (distance and time are unknown). Foulke was born 3 Dec 1817.	
Everett Hosack	101	2003	United States	Men	Sprints, Field	USATF Masters Hall of Fame Hosack competed at the 2003 Penn Relays. Dec 2004 Hosack was voted Masters Track and Field M100 athlete of the year.	
Robert Jones	101	2015	United States	Men	Field	Jones competed at the June 2015 Tennessee Senior Games at Franklin, TN.	
James A Kales	100 (99)	2014	United States	Men	Field	Competed at August 2014 Michigan Senior Olympics. Competed as M100 at age 99 under Senior Games rules. Born 24 Sept 1914.	
R Leonard Krause	100	2021	United States	Men	Field	Competed at Washington State Games in SP & DT July 2021.	
Tom Lane	100	1994	United States	Men	Field	Born 21 June 1894. Died 18 Aug 1997. Lane competed at the 10 Sept 10 1994 Cal Senior Games in San Diego. Lane lived in San Diego. Lane was legally blind since 1988.	
Trent Lane	101	2011	United States	Men	Field	Born 28 March 1910. Lane competed at the June 2011 Senior Games in Houston, Texas.	
Ben Levinson	103	1998	United States	Men	Shot Put	American M100 athlete (age 103) competed in the shot put at the Nike World Games (Eugene, Oregon) on Aug 11, 1998. From Los Angeles, California, he was later interviewed by Jay Leno on the Tonight Show.	
Larry Lewis	102	1969	United States	Men	Sprints	Lewis ran exhibition 100 yard dash in 17.8 at Cox Stadium June 1968 (age 101), and an exhibition 17.3 at Cox Stadium June 1969 (age 102). These marks were never ratified. Lewis was born in the summer of 1867.	
Waldo McBurney	100	2003	United States	Men	Sprints, Field	Dec 2003 McBurney was voted American Masters Track and Field M100 athlete of the year.	
Leland McPhie	100	2014	United States	Men	Field	Won gold medals in the weight throw, superweight throw and shot put in March 2014.	
E. Gerald Meyer	105	2025	United States	Men	Sprints	Meyer won four gold medals at a 2019 Senior Games, and competed in 2025 Wyoming Senior Games.	
D Paul Miller	100 (99)	2017	United States	Men	Sprints, Field	Miller captured four gold medals at a June 2017 Senior Games. Miller age 99 competing under Senior Games rules competed with the M100 group.	
Donald Pellmann	100	2015	United States	Men	Sprints, Field	USATF Masters Hall of Fame	
John Pugh	100	2013	United States	Men	Field	Pugh's last competition was in 2013 in Cleveland, Ohio, when he won gold medals in the 100-year-old category in the shot put, and discus.	
Orville Rogers	100	2018	United States	Men	Sprints, Distance	USATF Masters Hall of Fame	
Fordie Ross	100	2014	United States	Men	Field	Ross' last competing was at a 2014 Senior Games.	
George Rowswell	101	2018	United States	Men	Field	Rowswell last competed at a 2018 Senior Games (gold medal in the shot put).	
John Whittemore	104	2004	United States	Men	Field	Whittemore competed (Javelin) at the Oct 2004 Club West meet in Santa Barbara.	
Lester Wright Sr	100	2022	United States	Men	Sprints	Wright completed the 100 meter dash at the 2022 Penn Relays.	
Frederick Winter	102	2017	United States	Men	Sprints, Field	Winter was the first M100 American / Senior Games to complete a 100 meter dash in Minneapolis at their 2015 Senior Games.	
John Zilverberg	103	2017	United States	Men	Field	Zilverberg (born 2 Aug 1913) won gold medal at the 2015 South Dakota Senior Games. He competed at 103 at the 2017 Senior Games and won four T&F gold medals.	
Fay Bond	101	2025	United States	Women	Throwing Events	Throwing Events at National Senior Games in Ames, IA	
Ella Mae Colbert	100	2016	United States	Women	Exhibition 100 Meter	Exhibition 100 Meter dash, near Chesnee, South Carolina.	
Diane Friedman	100	2021	United States	Women	Sprints, JT	Competed in the Sprints and JT at the Aug 15, 2021 Michigan Senior Games.	
Julia “Hurricane” Hawkins	105	2021	United States	Women	Sprints, Shot Put	Hawkins competed at the June 2019 National Senior Games in the sprints. Julia Hawkins (age 105) competed in the 100 meter dash on Nov 6, 2021. The race was held at the Nov 6, 2021 Louisiana Senior Games at the Southeastern University’s track in Hammond, LA. Hawkins was born Feb. 10, 1916.	
Ida Keeling	102	2018	United States	Women	Sprints	On April 30, 2016, Keeling became the first woman in history to complete a 100-meter run at the age of 100. Her time of 1:17.33 was witnessed by a crowd of 44,469 at the 2016 Penn Relays. On February 24, 2018, she set a world record in the 60-meter dash event at the Imperial Dade Track Classic, with a time of 58:34 in the 100 to 104 age group.	
Margaret White	100	1995	United States	Women	Shot Put, Discus	Potentially the first American W100 athlete (age 100) competing 30 July 1994 in the shot put and discus. It appears that these marks were not submitted for ratification for records. White won gold at the 29 Jan 1995 Sooner State Games (indoor). Margaret White held the W95 world record in the SP. White won an American National "W95 Age Group" award in 1992. Margaret (Palmer) White (of Turpin, OK) was the mother of Masters Hall of Fame athlete Wendell Palmer (of Pampa, TX).	

== Centenarian media coverage ==
- 6 Feb 1995 Margaret White (age 100) was featured on Sports Illustrated (SI) that she competed at the Jan 29, 1995 Sooner State Games (indoor) in the shot put.
- 21 Feb 1995 Margaret White was featured on The Jay Leno Show "as being the oldest shot-put person". She was also on The Phil Donahue Show.
- In 1998, Ben Levinson appeared on The Howie Mandel Show, CBS 48 Hours, and The Jay Leno Show after competing in the shot put at age 103.
- Everett Hosack (100) competed at the Penn Relays in 2002. Philadelphia Inquirer stated "... the oldest ever to run at the carnival [Penn Relay] ..." and "The crowd of 50,827 took to Hosack right away. He received a standing ovation ..." Later in 2002 Everett was a guest on The Jay Leno Show, "demonstrating his shot-putting prowess".
- In 2003, Waldo McBurney ran the 100 meter at the World Masters Athletic Championship in San Jose, Puerto Rico. The paper reports, "... he competes to show people you can still perform at an old age". In 2004 the Hayes Daily News reported that he published a book "My First 100 Years: A Look Back from the Finish Line".
- Santa Barbara Round Table reports John Whittemore, "Holds numerous Track & Field Records over 75-year-old Class". Book written by Art Linkletter states, "... Whittemore has been competing in track and field - and setting records since his boyhood ... was working out with weights daily and still thinking about new records".
- In 2015 Sports Illustrated (SI) reported, "100-year-old Frederick Winter of Holland, Mich., became the oldest man in National Senior Games history to complete the 100-meter dash".
- Ida Keeling appeared on an ESPN story, writer states "won't be stopping anytime soon".
- At the 2018 Masters National Indoor Track and Field Championship Orville Rogers (age 100) and Julia “Hurricane” Hawkins set 60 meter dash world records. Runner's World coverage stated, "Two Centenarians Steal the Show at USATF Masters Indoor Championships".
- June 2019 Express & Star news (out of Wolverhampton, England) reports, "At 103, Julia Hurricane Hawkins has cemented her title as the oldest woman to compete on an American track after finishing the 50- and 100 meter dashes at the National Senior Games in New Mexico".
- In 2020 BBC reports a story about the "Centenarian Olympics" featuring Julia "Hurricane" Hawkins and the benefits of continuing sports and other activities.

=== Centenarian videos ===
- In 2018 at the Masters National Indoor Track and Field Championship Orville Rogers (age 100) and Julia “Hurricane” Hawkins set 60 meter dash world records. Both of the races were aired by CNBC sports: (link)
- Polish athlete Stanislaw Kowalski (age 104) set a (former) record for the 60 meter dash. Facebook video: (link)
- Sept 2015 a Times of San Diego story and video on Don Pellmann's record setting week (five records). (Link)
- In 2016 NBC Sports captured Ida Keeling (age 100) competing in the Penn Relays. Short video: (Link)
- At the 2016 Pan American Games in Vancouver, Canada, Man Kaur (age 100) race was captured on YouTube: (Link) At the same meet, in a Sports Illustrated story "when she crossed the finish line in Vancouver, her competitors - many of them in their 70s and 80s - were there to cheer her on", and Five-time Olympian Charmain Crook refer to her stating "I know that it's inspired me".
- In 2019 ESPN featured Julia “Hurricane” Hawkins (age 103) in a short video: (link)
