= Masters M90 javelin throw world record progression =

Masters M90 javelin throw world record progression is the progression of world record improvements of the javelin throw M90 division of Masters athletics. Records must be set in properly conducted, official competitions under the standing IAAF rules unless modified by World Masters Athletics. The M90 division consists of male athletes who have reached the age of 90 but have not yet reached the age of 95, so exactly from their 90th birthday to the day before their 95th birthday. The M90 division throws a 400 g implement.

Key

Incomplete information Pending

Distance	Athlete	Nationality	Birthdate	Age	Location	Date	Ref
23.87 m	Helge Lönnroth	Finland	8 December 1916	90 years, 170 days	Vihti	27 May 2007	
23.51 m	Klaus Langer	Germany	15 July 1916	90 years, 5 days	Poznań	20 July 2006	
22.71 m A	Donald Pellmann	United States	12.08.1915	Fort Collins	03.09.2005		
21.59	Kalle Lehtinen	Finland	19.08.1908	Kajaani	17.06.2000		
