= Hidekichi Miyazaki =

Japanese athletics competitor (1910–2019)

- Born: September 22, 1910; Hamamatsu, Shizuoka Prefecture, Japan
- Died: January 23, 2019 (aged 108)
- Occupations: Masters Athlete (M100 and M105 age divisions)

Hidekichi Miyazaki (September 22, 1910 – January 23, 2019) was a Japanese centenarian masters athlete in sprinting, affectionally nicknamed Golden Bolt, a name play on former Jamaican sprinter Usain Bolt. He was a former official holder of the world record in the M100 100 metres.

On September 23, 2015, the day after his 105th birthday, he competed in the 105 year age division. Later, Guinness World Records (GWR) certified he was the first person that achieved this record. (Note: Although Stanisław Kowalski claimed to be the first person that competed earlier in the year on June 28, GWR has not certified his record, but Miyazaki's.)

Miyazaki died on January 23, 2019, from a cerebral haemorrhage at the age of 108.

== Biography ==
=== Masters event ===
The event held in Kyoto was held in commemoration of "Respect for the Aged Day (held every September 15), with official timing and a field of younger competitors in their eighties, Miyazaki completed the race in 42.22, slower than the 34.50 recorded by Kowalski. Miyazaki only took up the sport in his nineties. "I'm still a beginner, you know. I'll have to train harder. Training was going splendidly, so I had set myself a target of 35 seconds. I can still go faster." Following his race he posed in the Lightning Bolt stance, made famous by Usain Bolt. "I will say this: I'm proud of my health. The doctors gave me a medical examination a couple of days ago and I'm fit as a fiddle. My brain might not be the sharpest but physically I'm tip-top. I've never had any health problems. The doctors are amazed by me. I can definitely keep on running for another two or three years. It's all about willpower. You have to keep going".

Prior to 2015, the title of "World's Oldest Athlete" was held by American John Whittemore, who did throwing events at age 104 and 10 months in Santa Barbara in 2004. The oldest female athlete was Australian Ruth Frith, mother of Olympian Helen Frith, who was throwing all implements of the throws pentathlon at age 101.

Five years earlier, October 3, 2010, on the same track, Miyazaki had set the record in the M100 division at 29.83, which is the mark ratified by World Masters Athletics, the world governing body for athletics over age 35.

American Donald Pellmann, had just 3 days earlier surpassed Miyazaki's M100 record, running 26.99 in a race in San Diego. In that meet, Pellmann became the first centenarian to record a successful long jump and high jump. Pellmann also attempted a pole vault.

== See also ==
- List of centenarian masters track and field athletes
