= Giuseppe Ottaviani (athlete) =

Italian athlete (1916–2020)

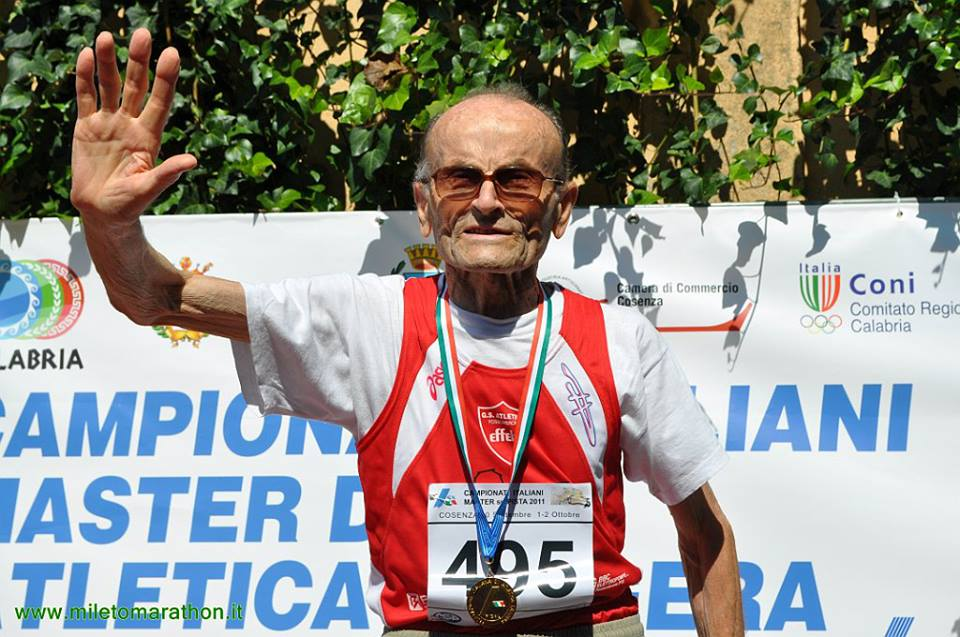

Personal information
- Born: 20 May 1916 Sant'Ippolito, Italy
- Died: 19 July 2020 (aged 104) Sant'Ippolito, Italy

Sport
- Country: Italy
- Club: G.S. Atl. Effebi Fossombrone

Achievements and titles
- Personal best(s): 60 metres indoor = 14.28 M95 WR; 60 metres indoor = 17.52 M100 WR Long Jump indoor = 1,16 M100 WR; Triple jump indoor = 3,27 M100 WR; Shot Put indoor = 4,43 M100 WR; Triple Jump =3,54 M100 WR; Weight Throw =4,92 M100 WR; Throws Pentathlon=2533p M100WR
Medal record
Master athletics
World Masters Championships
Gold medal – first place	2018 Malaga	Long jump M100
Gold medal – first place	2018 Malaga	Triple jump M100
European Masters Championships
Gold medal – first place	2019 Jesolo	Long jump M100

Giuseppe Ottaviani (20 May 1916 – 19 July 2020) was an Italian centenarian and masters athlete, and Commander of the Italian Republic for high sporting merits.

He was the first and only centenary athlete to have made a qualifying triple jump for his Masters category (M100, or those 100 years of age and older). He was the indoor world record holder in the M100 60 metres at the time of his death. He also held the indoor world record for the triple jump and long jump, and the outdoor world record for the triple jump He has 56 Italian National Championships with 13 national records, still holds 9 world records and the European discus record.

== Biography ==
After serving in the Italian Air Force during World War II, he spent his career as a men's tailor.

He married Alba Michelini and has three children: Paolo, Marzia and Matelda. Marzia is now a top masters marathon runner.

At the suggestion of the brothers Paolo and Giuliano Costantini, he started masters athletics in the late 1980s. He won his first national championship in 1999. He was coached by Graziano Bacchiocchi and then in 2010, Mauro Angelini coached him to high jump. After turning 95 in 2011, he became the first 95-year-old athlete to surpass 2 metres for the long jump and 4 metres for the triple jump. He drove himself the 25 km from his home in Sant'Ippolito to the training facility in Fano.

At age 94 he bought a wireless ADSL computer, at 97 he enrolled in the University of the Third Age in Fossombrone and at the Indoor World Championship in Budapest he won 10 gold medals, unmatched record. He turned 100 in May 2016.

Ottaviani died on 19 July 2020 at the age of 104.

== Additional ==
List of centenarian masters track and field athletes
