= USATF Masters Outdoor Championships =

Masters track and field competition

- Sport: Masters track and field
- Founded: 1968; 58 years ago
- Country: United States
- Related competitions: USATF Masters Indoor Championships
- Website: usatfmasters.org

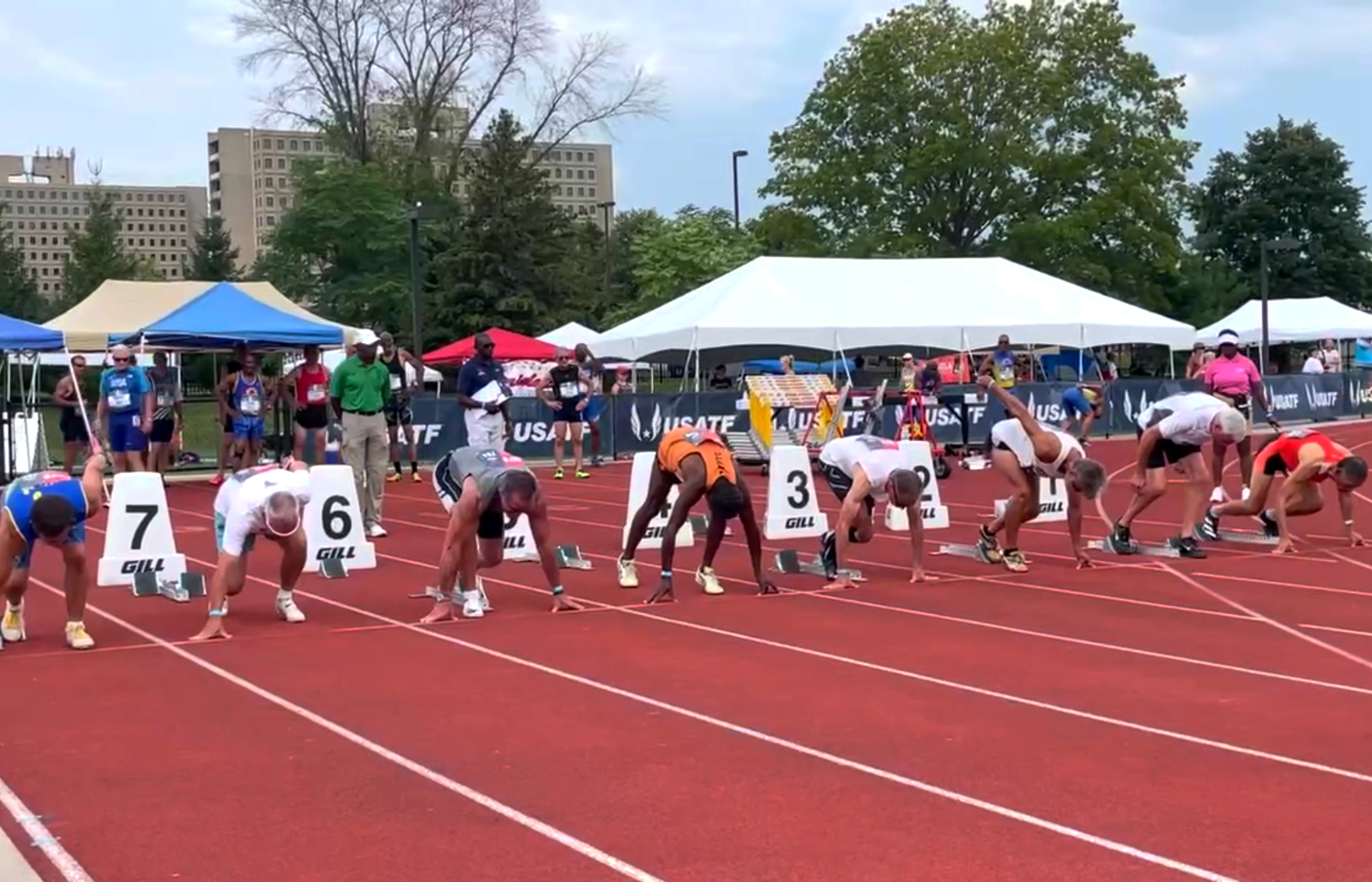
Men 70-74 100 meter dash at 2021 Championships in Ames, Iowa

The USATF Masters Outdoor Championships is an annual track and field competition which serves as the national championship for the United States for athletes in masters age groups. Organized by USA Track & Field, the national governing body for the sport, the competition was first held in 1968. Athletes compete in 5-year age groups, beginning from 25 and up to 105 (where sufficient entries are made). Traditionally limited to athletes over 35, a "pre-masters" group was introduced in 2020 to encourage post-collegiate athletes over 25 to continue competing.

The 1968 meet was the first ever national championship for masters track and field. David Pain organized a masters mile run competition in 1966 at Balboa Stadium in San Diego, which grew into a wider track and field championship two years later.

== History ==
Through the efforts of David Pain, masters track and field and its first Outdoor Track and Field Championship began in 1968. The first competition was held July 19–21, 1968 in San Diego. The 1968 meet included competitions for men age 40 and older. The meet has continued annually since, with the exception of 2020 which was cancelled due to the COVID-19 pandemic. The 1968 meet, and for several years after, included programs providing time schedules, and athletes names and ages. 1968 represented the first time a major masters track and field competition was held. The meet was sponsored by the San Diego Recreation Department, San Diego Track and Field Association, and the Los Angeles Seniors Track Club.

The 1971 meet (and future meets) added women as part of the competition. The 2019 meet included a complete set of individual running (sprints, middle distance, and long distance), hurdles, steeplechase, race walk, jumps (high jump, pole vault, long jump, triple jump) and throwing events (shot put, discus, hammer, and javelin), as well as team relays.

The USA National Masters Outdoor Track and Field Championship has included many prominent feats within the sport of masters track and field. At the 1968 meet, James Gorrell ran one of the fastest miles ever run by an athlete over age 40. The 1969 meet included 535 participants. At the 1970 meet, Richard Stolpe broke the 220 yard masters record in 23.3, Jack Razzetto the high jump record, and Sandy Patterson the hammer throw record. More recently, distance runner Nolan Shaheed and sprinter Irene Obera have been multi-time masters national champions.

In August 1988 a major milestone was achieved when Philipa Raschker was the first female to pole vault at a major USA track and field championship for any age category. She vaulted 2.45 (8'-0 1/2") at age 40.

The 1988 meet added a special event the “Legends Miles” (M40) that included Ron Bell (Britain), Byron Dyce (Jamaican Olympian), Harry Nolan, John Dixon (New Zealand), Ken Sparks, Al Swenson, Web Loudat, Steve Ferraz, and Ron Jensen. Bell setting a new M40 World Record while winning in 4:12.58.

Frank Struna has had much success at the competition, winning eight national championships (six triple jump and two long jump), and setting a then current M55 indoor triple jump record.

The 2009 meet included several masters records by Leland McPhie (M95), Karen Steen (W45), Sabre Harvey (W60), Becky Sisley (W70) and Florence Meiler (W70).

At the July 2010 meet Ralph Maxwell was the first American age 90 plus to complete the sprint hurdle race. Ralph was rewarded with a gold medal and a masters M90 world record in a time of 21.47.

The 2014 meet included three separate M90 plus masters relay records. Each record included a foursome all age 90 and older. Champion Goldy Sr (97), Orville Rogers (96), Roy Englert (92), Charles Ross (91), and Charles Boyle (91) shared the workload, medals, and records.

USATF offered funds to top ranked American masters athletes to support travel to the competition in 2019.

A full history of past results of the competition is held by Mastershistory.org, while a full list of organizer bids for the event is held at the USATF website.

== Participants ==
=== Olympians ===
Numerous Olympians have competed at the USA Masters Outdoor Championships. In 1968 Bruce MacDonald won two gold medals. Johnny Kelley, winner at the Boston Marathon, was also the winner of the M50+ division Marathon race, Bud Held won the javelin in 218’-2”, and Fortune Gordien won in his discus throw category. Gordien and George Rhoden (a Jamaican Olympian) won gold at the 1969 meet. Bud Held broke the masters world record in the javelin with 229’-3” throw at the 1970 meet. The July 1970 meet also included Arthur Barnard, Boo Morcom, Bob Richards, and Steve Seymour as competitors.

Payton Jordan (1964 and 1968 Olympic Coach) won 100 and 200 meters at the 1989 meet.

Jim Burnett competed at the 1980 Masters Outdoor Championship was an alternate leg on the 1968 Olympics relay team.

The 1994 Outdoor meet included Tom Gage, Phil Mulkey, Deby LaPlante Sweezey, and Fred Sowerby (an Antigua and Barbuda Olympian).

1996, Kate Schmidt (age 42) won the javelin at the Masters National Outdoor Track and Field Championship, Spokane, WA.

Jo Ann Terry Grissom won the shot put at the 2003 meet.

The 2009 Meet included Ed Burke, Dick Cochran, Trish Porter, and Karl Smith (Jamaica Olympian).

Ed Burke, Kip Janvrin, Sunder Nix, Jason Rouser and Chris Williams (Jamaican Olympian) competed at the 2013 meet.

Chaunté Lowe won the high jump at the July 2015 USA Masters Outdoor Track and Field Championship.

Walter Dix won the 100 meter dash at the 2017 meet in 10.28. Michelle Rohl and Jim Barrineau competed at the 2019 Ames, Iowa meet.

2024 included Michelle Rohl, Allen James and Ed Burke (hammer thrower) Nigerian Olympian Olutoyin Augustus "Toyin" also competed in 2024.

2025, Joetta Clark Diggs won the W60 200 meter dash. Jim Barrineau and Garth Robinson competed at the meet as well. 2026, Joetta Clark Diggs won the W60 200 meter dash.

=== Others ===
"The Freeze" of the Atlanta Braves (Durann Dunn) competed at the 2022 Meet.

Competitors Charles Allie and Rita Hanscom received the male and female masters international athlete of the year awards from the IAAF in 2013 and 2009, respectively.

Several former National Football League (NFL) football players have competed at this meet. NFL pro bowler Billy "White Shoes" Johnson and star sprinter, ran at the 2004 meet. Others include Todd Christensen (2006), Henry Ellard (2014–2016), Willie Gault (2003), Fred Jackson (2019), and James Lofton (2001).

Several notable individuals from politics have been involved with the Masters National Outdoor Track and Field Championship.

Senator and ex-Stanford trackman Alan Cranston competed in the 100 yard dash at the 1969 meet. Massachusetts RRCA State Representative Stephen Viegas competed at the 2012 meet. In September 1970, Ken Carnine, winner of the 1970 discus throw and javelin throw events, was given the honor to present former President Richard Nixon a special medal for the President's support of Masters Track and Field competition.

Chancellor of the University of California, Irvine, Daniel Aldrich, competed in several National Championships, with him remarking in the Los Angeles Times "My whole attitude about life and my general personal and physical characteristics are affected by my sports activities...but I’m certainly the best discus-throwing administrator in the country". A predecessor in his former position as Chancellor of University of California, Santa Barbara, Vernon Cheadle held several age records in the shot put.

Judge John Dobroth won the high jump at the 2010 meet.

Centenarians that have competed at this meet include Orville Rogers (age 100 in 2018) and Julia "Hurricane" Hawkins (age 101 in 2017).

Masters world champion and world record holder, Nolan Shaheed is a world class trumpet player. Shaheed has played with Count Basie, Stevie Wonder, and Aretha Franklin. For Shaheed the running and music has benefited each other.

American political historian Allan Lichtman won the 1979 3000 metres steeplechase championship in the age 30-35 category, running 11:06.1 as the only listed competitor in his age group. He also finished 6th in the 1500 m that year, running 4:17.48. In 2024, he produced a video with the New York Times re-enacting him running at a masters athletics meet while explaining his U.S. presidential prediction methodology.

== Media coverage ==
The Championships are webcast on usatf.tv, with several cameras around the venue and an announcer providing athlete introductions and live commentary.

The competition has often received national coverage focused on the oldest participants. 2018 medal winner, Orville Rogers (age 100) and his family were interviewed by The Washington Post, Fox News, ESPN, and CBS during the 2018 season. The Washington Post also reported on the 2017 event, where at age 101 Julia “Hurricane” Hawkins became the oldest female to compete at the Masters National Outdoor Championship, setting a masters W100 meet record.

Organizers of open class events have responded positively to the event, such as in 2009 Bob Weiner (USATF Masters Media Chair) stating "the event ran smoothly [and] was a spectacularly executed meet".

The Honolulu Advertiser provided coverage of Harold Chapson's performance, who having had polio at age 5 became the 1976 Masters National Champion.

Ames Tribune included an action picture of hurdlers Rita Hanscom, Kay Glynn (local resident), and Jo Phelps at the 2019 Championship.

Runner Space reported that the 2021 Championship included 27 Masters American Records and five Masters World Records.

== Editions ==
Edition	Location	Date	Ref.
AAU
1968	San Diego, CA	July 19–21, 1968	
1969	San Diego, CA	July 3–6, 1969	
1970	San Diego, CA	July 2–5, 1970	
1971	San Diego, CA	July 2–4, 1971	
1972	San Diego, CA	July 1–3, 1972	
1973	San Diego, CA	July 6–8, 1973	
1974	Gresham, Oregon	July 5–7, 1974	
1975	White Plains, New York	Aug 8–10, 1975	
1976	Gresham, Oregon	July 2–4, 1976	
1977	Naperville, Illinois	July 1–3, 1977	
1978	Atlanta, GA	July 7–9, 1978	
1979	Gresham, Oregon	July 6–8, 1979	
1980 & 1981 were transition years leaving the AAU
1980 TFA	Atlanta, GA	June 14, 1980	
1980 TAC	Philadelphia, PA	July 4–6, 1980	
1981 TFA	Atlanta, GA	June 13–14, 1981	
1981 TAC	Los Gatos, California	Aug 15–16, 1981	
TAC
1982	Wichita, Kansas	Aug 6–8, 1982	
1983	Houston, TX	Sept 16–18, 1983	
1984	Eugene, Oregon	Aug 17–19, 1984	
1985	Indianapolis, IN	Aug 23–25, 1985	
1986	Uniondale, New York	Jul 18–20, 1986	
1987	Eugene, Oregon	Aug 14–16, 1987	
1988	Orlando, Florida	Aug 4–7, 1988	
1989	San Diego, CA	July 20–23, 1989	
1990	Indianapolis, IN	Aug 2–5, 1990	
1991	Naperville, Illinois	July 4–7, 1991	
1992	Spokane, Washington	Aug 13–16, 1992	
USATF 1993 to Present
1993	Provo, Utah	Aug 11–14, 1993	
1994	Eugene, Oregon	Aug 11–14, 1994	
1995	East Lansing, Michigan	July 5–9, 1995	
1996	Spokane, Washington	Aug 15–18, 1996	
1997	San Jose, California	Aug 7–10, 1997	
1998	Orono, Maine	July 30 – Aug 2, 1998	
1999	Orlando, Florida	Aug 26–29, 1999	
2000	Eugene, Oregon	Aug 10-13, 2000	
2001	Baton Rouge, Louisiana	July 25–28, 2001	
2002	Orono, Maine	Aug 8–11, 2002	
2003	Eugene, Oregon	Aug 7–10, 2003	
2004	Decatur, Illinois	Aug 5–8, 2004	
2005	Honolulu, HI	Aug 4–7, 2005	
2006	Charlotte, North Carolina	Aug 3–6, 2006	
2007	Orono, Maine	Aug 2–5, 2007	
2008	Spokane, Washington	Aug 7–10, 2008	
2009	Oshkosh, Wisconsin	July 9–12, 2009	
2010	Sacramento, California	July 22–25, 2010	
2011	Berea, Ohio	July 28–31, 2011	
2012	Lisle, Illinois	Aug 2–5, 2012	
2013	Olathe, Kansas	July 11–14, 2013	
2014	Winston-Salem, North Carolina	July 17–20, 2014	
2015	Jacksonville, Florida	July 23–26, 2015	
2016	Allendale, Michigan	July 14–17, 2016	
2017	Baton Rouge, Louisiana	July 13–16, 2017	
2018	Cheney, Washington	July 26–29, 2018	
2019	Ames, Iowa	July 11–14, 2019	
2020	Cancelled due to COVID-19 pandemic	---	
2021	Ames, Iowa	July 22–25, 2021	
2022	Lexington, Kentucky	July 28–31, 2022	
2023	Greensboro, NC	July 20–23, 2023	
2024	Sacramento, CA	Jul 18–21, 2024	
2025	Huntsville, Alabama	Jul 17-20, 2025	
2026	Geneva, Ohio	Jul 16, 18, and 19, 2026	
2027	Ames, Iowa	Tentative July 22-25, 2027	

Over 1300 athletes to compete at the 2024 meet.

The 2026 meet was rescheduled twice due to poor air quality caused by the 2026 Canadian wildfires and resumed on Saturday, July 18, with some events held indoors at SPIRE Academy.

- Source for Meet Dates and Locations confirmed: Track & Field History

== Gallery ==
=== 2022 ===
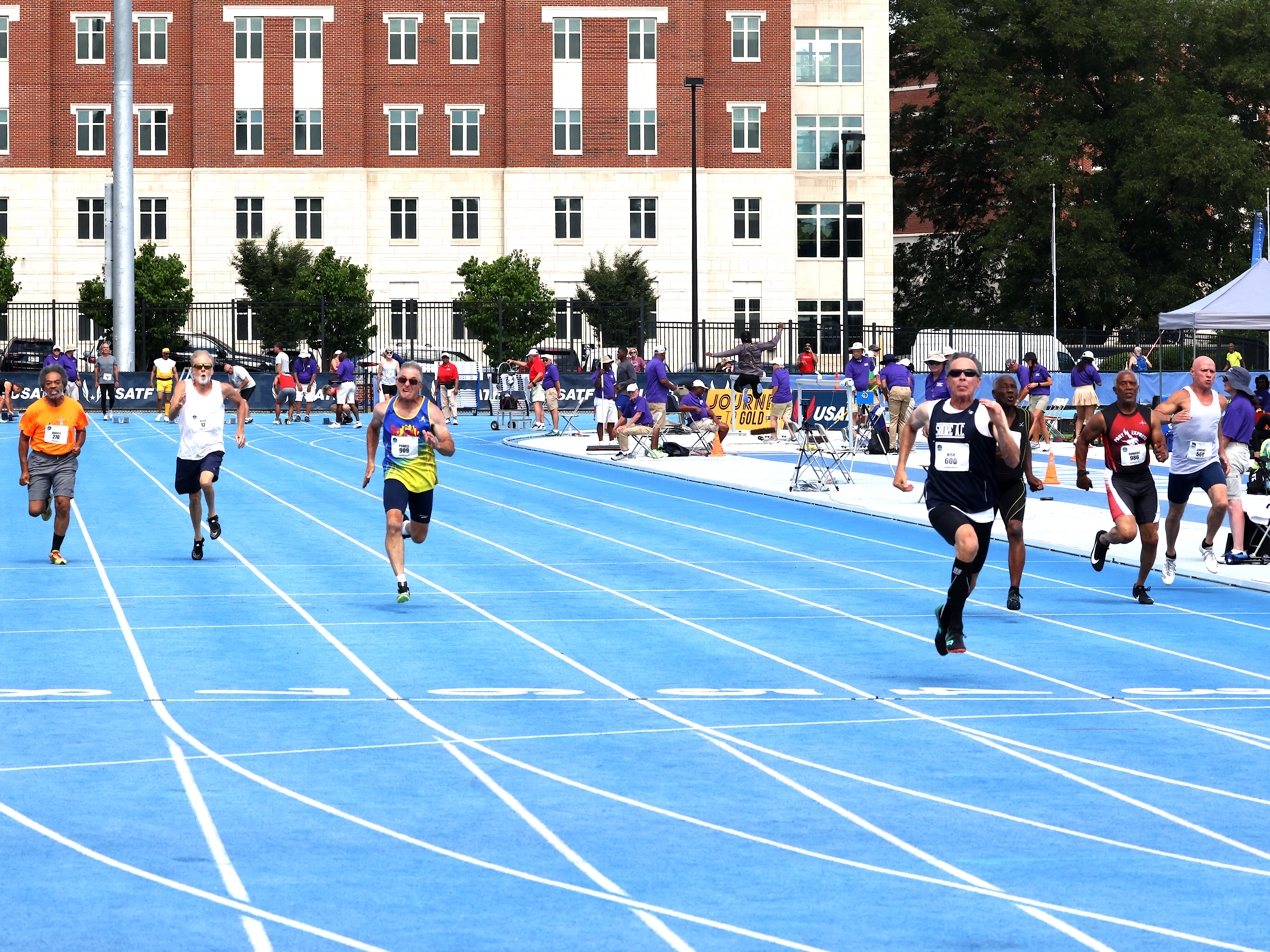
M70 100 Meters

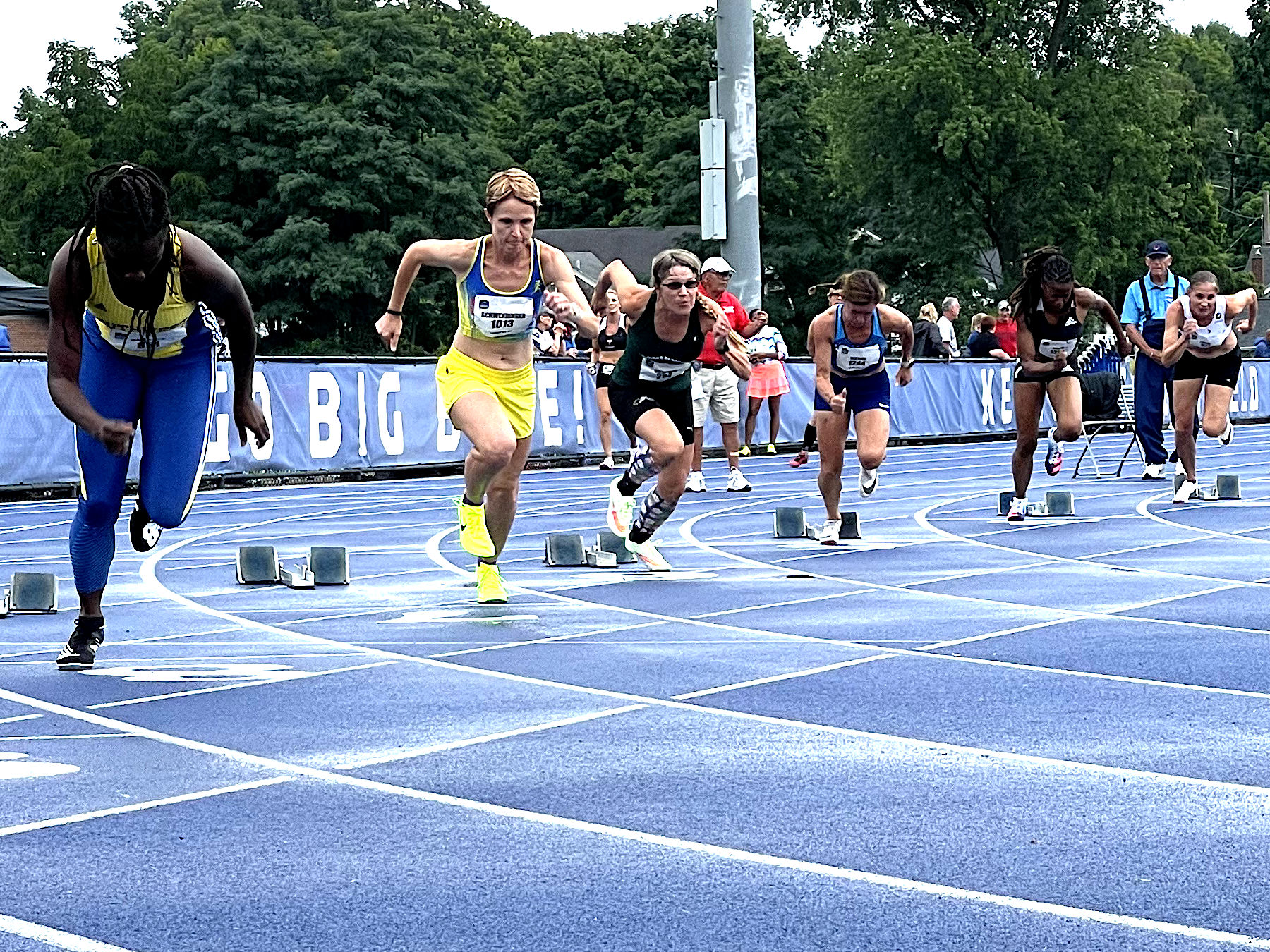
W45 200 Meters

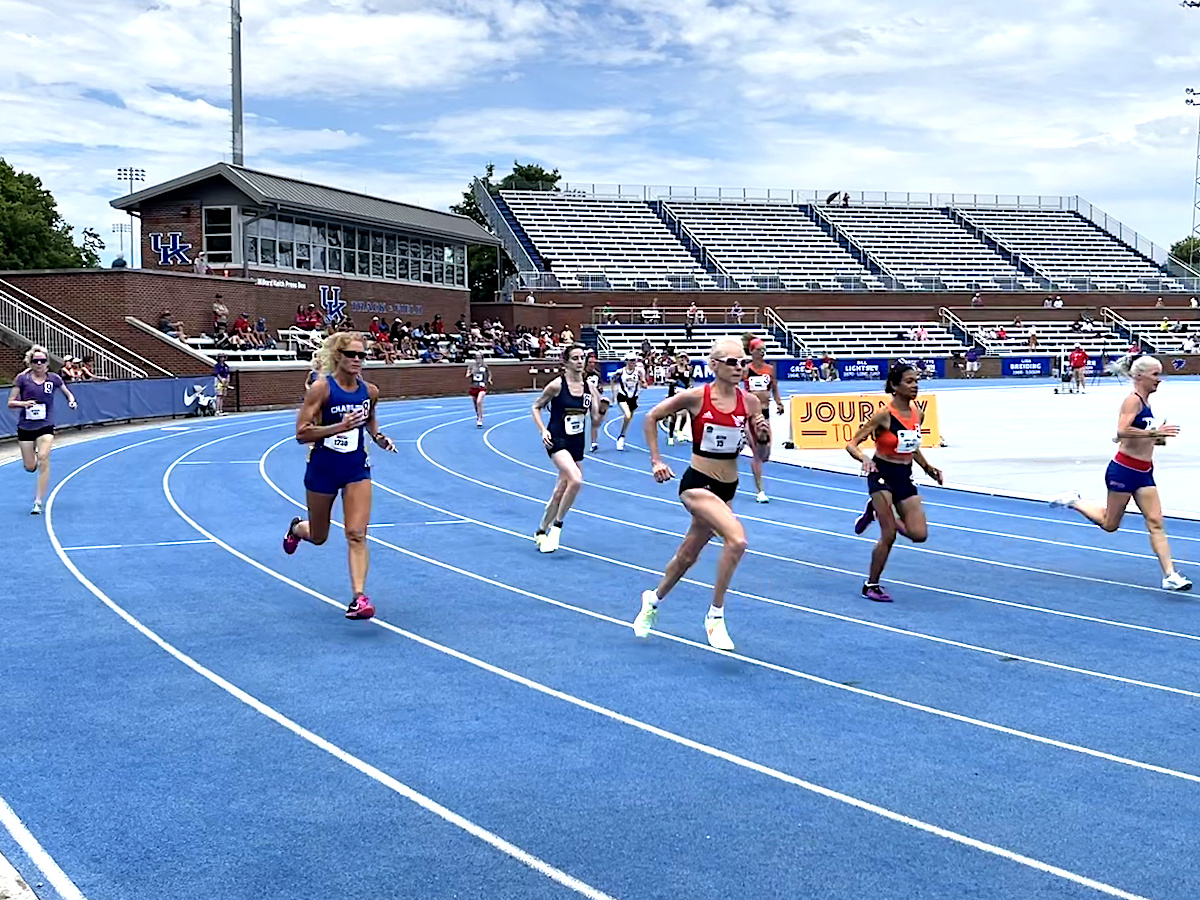
W55 800 Meters

== See also ==
- USA Masters Track and Field Hall of Fame
- List of masters athletes
- USATF Masters Indoor Championships
