= USATF Masters Indoor Championships =

American annual track and field competition

- Sport: Masters track and field
- Founded: 1975; 51 years ago
- Country: United States
- Related competitions: USATF Masters Outdoor Championships
- Website: USATF Official website

The USATF Masters Indoor Championships is an annual track and field competition which serves as the national indoor championship for the United States for athletes in masters age groups. Organized by USA Track & Field, the national governing body for the sport, the competition was first held in 1975. Athletes compete in 5-year age groups, beginning from 25 and up to 105 (where sufficient entries are made). Traditionally limited to athletes over 35, a "pre-masters" group was introduced from 2020 onwards to encourage post-collegiate athletes over 25 to continue competing.

== History ==
David Pain organized a masters mile run competition in 1966 at Balboa Stadium in San Diego, which grew into a wider track and field championship two years later in 1968. Seven years after, the first National Masters Indoor Track and Field Championship was held March 2, 1975 in Hightstown, NJ. The meet was for men and women athletes age 40 and older. Contact for the meet was Rudy Clarence of New York. The 1975 meet was held at the new Peddie School athletic center with a Tartan indoor track (built in 1972). The meet has continued annually since, with the exception of 2020 and 2021 which was cancelled due to the COVID-19 pandemic.

The 1975 meet included Jerry Donley, Bob Fine, Ray Gordon, George Puterbaugh, and George A. Sheehan all winning medals at the 1975 meet. Ed McComas broke the listed Masters indoor shot put record. George Braceland, Bud Deacon, Claude Hills, Len Olson, and Archie Messenger were competitors at the 1976 meet.

Atlanta Track Club won the 1986 meet, with Philipa Raschker winning seven of their fourteen medals. During the March 1988 meet, a major milestone was achieved when Raschker became the first female to pole vault at a major USA indoor track and field championship for any age category. She vaulted 2.44 (8’-0”) at age 40. Track & Field News magazine would not report women pole vault records or rankings until after 1988, and women's pole vault at the Olympics took a further twelve years.

Denver Smith (Over the Hill Track Club) won three medals at the 1989 meet. Other winners included Jack Greenwood, Buck Bradberry, Horace Hudson, and Barbara Stewart. Rose Thompson and Sue Tallard won four and three events at the 1990 meet.

In 2005, June Machala won two gold medals, her husband Joe Machala won two medals, Thad Wilson (M50) won gold in the long jump, and Sean Maye (M35) set an American Indoor Record in the 200 meter dash.

March 2009 Henry Rono competed at the Landover, Maryland meet.

The 2019 meet included a full range of running, field, and relay events (including the pentathlon). Betty Lindberg (age 94), Dixon Hemphill (94) and George Roudebush (93) each won several medals at the 2019 meet. A full history of past results of the competition is held by Mastershistory.org, while a full list of organizer bids for the event is held at the USATF website.

Reggie Lewis Track and Athletic Center in Massachusetts has held the meet on several occasions.

USATF reports the 2022 meet included ten Masters American Records on the last day of competition.

== Participants ==
=== Olympians ===
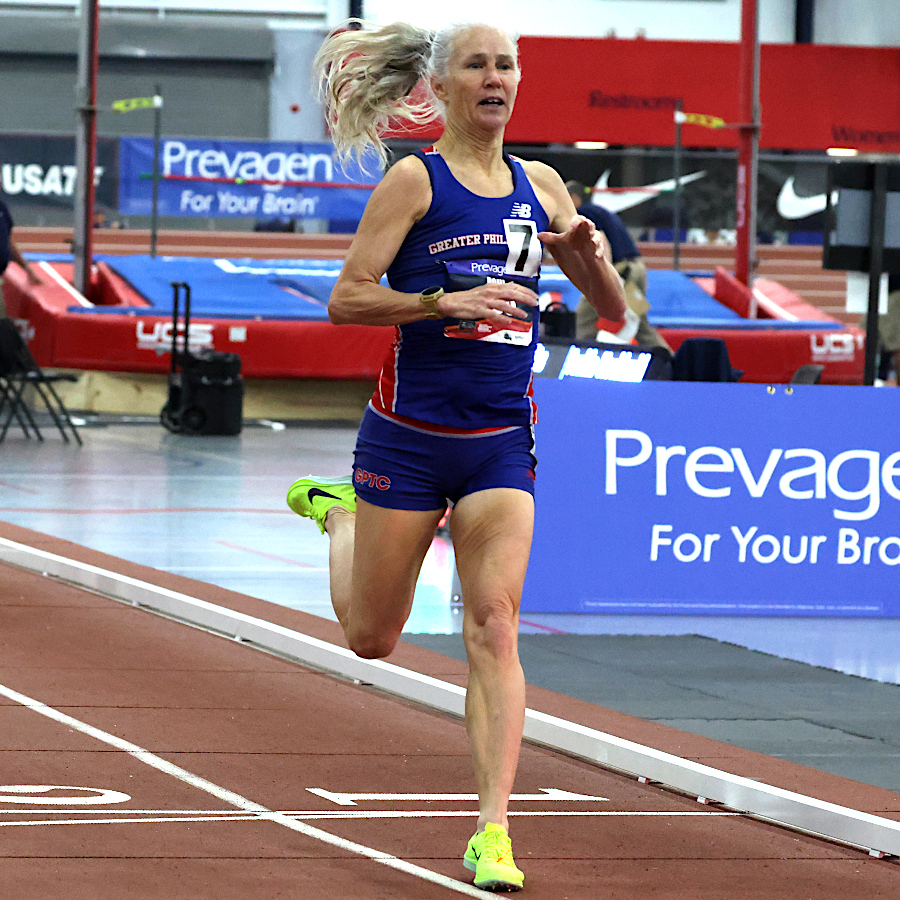
Michelle Rohl 2025

Numerous Olympians have competed at the USA Masters Indoor Championships.

In 1975 Bob Backus, Bruce MacDonald, and Bob Mimm each won gold at the first National AAU Masters Indoor Track and Field Championship. The 1976 meet included Bob Backus, Boo Morcom, and Phil Mulkey as competitors. Bill Toomey competed at the 1981 meet. Bob Mimm, Boo Morcom, Phil Mulkey, Bob Richards, Todd Scully and Fred Samara competed at the 1984 meet.

The 1986 meet included Bob Richards going head to head with Boo Morcom twice in the M60 division. Richards winning the PV, and Morcom winning the HJ. Thane Baker won two medals in the sprints. Bob Richards won a medal in the pole vault at the 1989 meet. Cliff Blair, Bob Richards, Cindy Bremser, and Sandy Knott won medals at the 1990 meet.

Eddie Hart, Phil Mulkey, Bob Richards, Jo Ann Terry Grissom, and Sandra Knott competed at the 1990 meet. Bill Rodgers and Joan Benoit Samuelson competed at the 2003 meet. Benoit Samuelson broke the 3000 meter Masters Record at the 2003 meet. Trish King (Patricia Porter) and Christopher Faulknor (Jamaican Olympian) won medals at the 2011 meet.

At the March 1994 meet Dwight Stones won the M40 high jump.

In March 2009, several Olympians competed at the Landover, Maryland meet, including Jim Barrineau, Renée Belanger (Canadian Olympian), and Howard Lindsay (Antiguan and Barbudan Olympian) March 2023 included multi-time winner Michelle Rohl (USA), and Jamaican Olympian Garth Robinson.

In February 2025, Joetta Clark Diggs won the W60 200 meter dash, setting an American indoor record of 28.62. Also, Michelle Rohl won 3 W55 races at 800, 1500, and 3000 meters. Nigerian Olympian Olutoyin Augustus "Toyin" also competed in 2025.

February 2026 Matthew Centrowitz Jr. - tentatively signed up - at age 36 - for the 2026 USATF Masters Indoor Championship.

February 2026 Joetta Clark Diggs and Michelle Rohl competed.

=== Others ===
Competitors Charles Allie and Rita Hanscom received the male and female masters international athlete of the year awards from the IAAF in 2013 and 2009, respectively.

Several former National Football League (NFL) football players have competed at this meet. Billy "White Shoes" Johnson competed at the 2002 meet. Willie Gault medaled at the 2003 meet. Todd Christensen competed at the 2004 meet. Henry Ellard medaled in the triple jump at the 2015. Phil McConkey competed at the 2017 meet. Competing as a M25 athlete: Tyreek Hill won the 60 meter dash at the 2023 Masters Indoor Championship.

=== Centenarians ===
Several Centenarians have competed at this meet. Everett Hosack (ages 100 and 101) competed at the 2002 and 2003 meets. Hosack set several records. March 2014 centenarian masters track and field athlete, Leland McPhie (age 100), won gold medals in the weight throw, superweight throw and shot put. Orville Rogers (100) and Julia “Hurricane” Hawkins (102) set Masters Records at the 2018 meet.

== Media coverage ==
The Championships are webcast on usatf.tv.

The competition receives mainstream coverage from American media outlets, typically focusing on the highest age brackets, as well as more detailed coverage from athletics-related media such as Runner's World.

1977, The Ashbury Park Press quoted a David Pain prediction, “there will be more Masters (40-plus) track athletes in the U.S. than younger athletes in less than 10 years”. 1985 the Baltimore Sun stated on M35 Mile winner Jim Shank, "Westminster man devotes life to running; won't quit as long as it's fun, competitive."

1990, Capital Times reports, “… take a back seat to the flood of world and American records that fell … four world records were broken, one world record was tied, and 22 American records were broken . . . “. Wisconsin State Journal quoted Bob Richards in 1990, “Boo Morcom . . . without a doubt the greatest star in Masters”. 1984 meet director Ron Salvio stated, “These Masters athletes are part of one of the most rapidly growing movements in sport”.

1998 Boston Globe reports, "The National Masters competition includes 17 track and field events and attracts more than 800 athletes from around the country ranging in age from 30 into the 90s". Fox TV News statement by Todd Christensen in 2004 “I’m impressed by the fact that it seems to me that you would think that at a certain age your competitiveness ends but it really doesn’t”.

2011 Albuquerque article on Nolan Shaheed shares his story on how playing jazz (horn) and distance running improves his music and his running. Shaheed is a multi-time National Champion and Record Holder.

== Editions ==
| Edition | Location | Date | Ref |
AAU
| 1975 | Hightstown, New Jersey | March 2, 1975 | |
| 1976 | Medford, Massachusetts Tufts Univ. | March 14, 1976 | |
| 1977 | New Haven, Connecticut | March 13, 1977 | |
| 1978 | East Stroudsburg, Pennsylvania | March 19, 1978 | |
| 1979 AAU | Ann Arbor, Michigan | March 17–18, 1979 | |
1980 & 1981 were transition years leaving the AAU
| 1980 AAU | Syracuse, New York | March 29, 1980 | |
| 1981 TFA | Liberty, Missouri | February 15, 1981 | |
| 1981 TAC | Ann Arbor, Michigan | February 28 – March 1, 1981 | |
TAC
| 1982 | Cambridge, Massachusetts | March 27–28, 1982 | |
| 1983 | Bethlehem, Pennsylvania | March 26–27, 1983 | |
| 1984 | Princeton, New Jersey | March 24–25, 1984 | |
| 1985 | Sterling, Illinois | March 30–31, 1985 | |
| 1986 | Baton Rouge, Louisiana | February 22–23, 1986 | |
| 1987 | Madison, Wisconsin | March 28–29, 1987 | |
| 1988 | Baton Rouge, Louisiana | March 19–20, 1988 | |
| 1989 | Columbus, Ohio | March 31 – April 2, 1989 | |
| 1990 | Madison, Wisconsin | March 24–25, 1990 | |
| 1991 | Blaine, Minnesota | March 22–24, 1991 | |
| 1992 | Columbus, Ohio | April 3–5, 1992 | |
USATF 1993 to Present
| 1993 | Bozeman, Montana | March 19–21, 1993 | |
| 1994 | Columbia, Missouri | March 25–27, 1994 | |
| 1995 | Reno, Nevada | February 24–26, 1995 | |
| 1996 | Greensboro, North Carolina | March 29–31, 1996 | |
| 1997 | Boston, MA | March 21–23, 1997 | |
| 1998 | Boston, MA | March 27–29, 1998 | |
| 1999 | Boston, MA | March 26–28, 1999 | |
| 2000 | Boston, MA | March 24–26, 2000 | |
| 2001 | Boston, MA | March 23–25, 2001 | |
| 2002 | Boston, MA | March 22–24, 2002 | |
| 2003 | Boston, MA | March 28–30, 2003 | |
| 2004 | Boston, MA | March 26–28, 2004 | |
| 2005 | Nampa, Idaho | March 11–13, 2005 | |
| 2006 | Boston, MA | March 24–26, 2006 | |
| 2007 | Boston, MA | March 23–25, 2007 | |
| 2008 | Boston, MA | March 28–30, 2008 | |
| 2009 | Landover, Maryland | March 20–22, 2009 | |
| 2010 | Boston, MA | March 26–28, 2010 | |
| 2011 | Albuquerque, New Mexico | March 4–6, 2011 | |
| 2012 | Bloomington, Indiana | March 16–18, 2012 | |
| 2013 | Landover, Maryland | March 22–24, 2013 | |
| 2014 | Boston, MA | March 14–16, 2014 | |
| 2015 | Winston-Salem, North Carolina | March 20–22, 2015 | |
| 2016 | Albuquerque, New Mexico | March 4–6, 2016 | |
| 2017 | Albuquerque, New Mexico | February 17–19, 2017 | |
| 2018 | Landover, Maryland | March 16–18, 2018 | |
| 2019 | Winston-Salem, North Carolina | March 1–4, 2019 | |
| 2020 | Cancelled due to COVID-19 pandemic | --- | |
| 2021 | Cancelled due to COVID-19 pandemic | --- | |
| 2022 | Fort Washington Avenue Armory, New York City, NY | March 18–20, 2022 | |
| 2023 | Norton Sports & Learning Center, Louisville, KY | March 10–12, 2023 | |
| 2024 | Chicago, IL | Mar 21–24, 2024 | |
| 2025 | Gainesville, Florida | Feb 20–23, 2025 | |
| 2026 | Albuquerque, New Mexico | Feb 19–22, 2026 | |
| 2027 | Gainesville, Florida | Feb 18–21, 2027 | |

- Source for Meet Dates and Locations confirmed: *=

== See also ==
- USA Masters Track and Field Hall of Fame
- List of masters athletes
- USATF Masters Outdoor Championships
