= Man Kaur =

Indian track-and-field athlete (1916–2021)

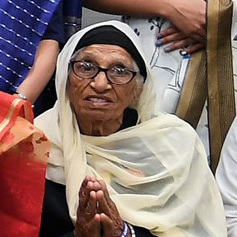
- Kaur in 2020
- Born: 1 March 1916; British Raj
- Died: 31 July 2021 (aged 105); India

Man Kaur (1 March 1916 – 31 July 2021) was an Indian track-and-field athlete. She holds the world records in the Over-100 years old categories for a variety of events. At the age of 103, she was given the Nari Shakti Puraskar award by the President of India.

== Life ==
Man Kaur's height was about five feet (150 cm) and she was a native Punjabi speaker. She won multiple gold medals at the World Masters Athletics Championships.

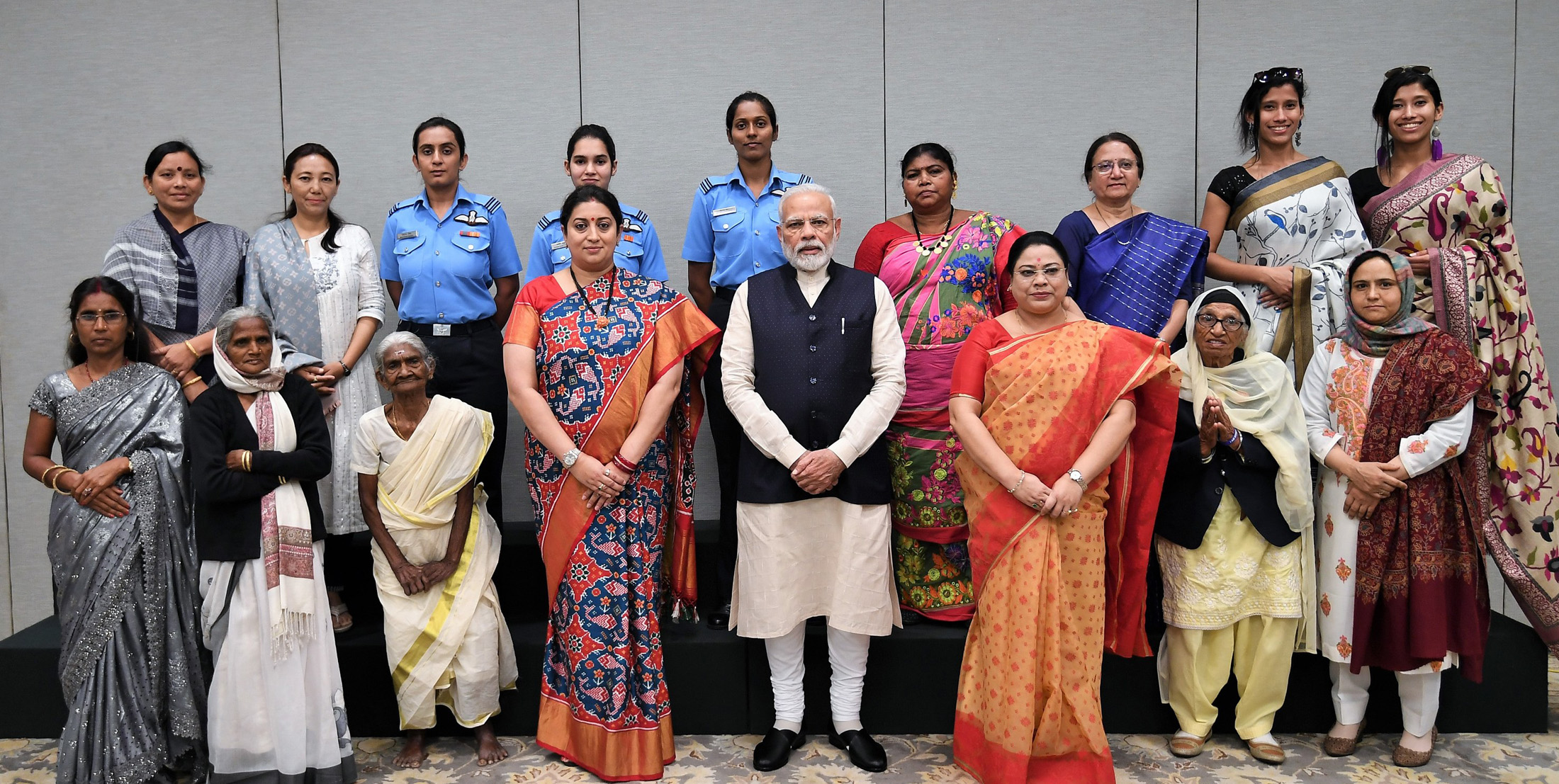
Prime Minister Narendra Modi with the Nari Shakti Awardees on International Women's Day in 2020. Kaur is the person on the 2nd right in the bottom row.

She did not start to pursue athletics until she was 93. In 2016 she became the fastest centenarian at a competition in the American Masters Games.

In anticipation of the 2017 World Masters Games, Kaur trained regularly at Punjabi University, in hopes of improving upon her own world record which she set over the years. Her coach was her own son Gurdev Singh, who was 79 years old at that time. In the 2017 games, held in Auckland, New Zealand she completed the 100 metre sprint in 74 seconds.

In 2019 she competed in Poland winning four events in her category - shot put, 60m sprint, 200m, and the javelin. She completed the 60m race in 36 seconds and "felt great" afterwards. After this she and Gurdev were invited to tour universities in Baru Sahib where they inspired students when they spoke about their achievements and the diet they follow. As per those speeches, their diet includes nuts and pulses, home grown soy milk, kefir, wheatgrass juice, and sprouted wheat which they turn into chapatis.

Late 2019, Kaur (age 103) won gold in the 200 meter dash at 3:01.61 and shot put at 2.21 m at the December 2019 Asian Masters Championship in Malaysia.

On 8 March (International Women's Day) 2020 she was handed the Nari Shakti Puraskar award. The award was presented at Rashtrapati Bhavan the Presidential Palace India in New Delhi by the President of India with the Prime Minister of India, Narendra Modi, in attendance. She was nicknamed the "Miracle from Chandigarh".

Kaur died on 31 July 2021, at the age of 105, after suffering from gallbladder cancer.

== See also ==
- List of centenarian masters track and field athletes
- List of masters athletes
