= Gerhard Windolf =

German athlete (1924–2018)

Gerhard Windolf (13 January 1924 – 3 November 2018) was a German Masters track and field athlete. He was the 1995 Masters World Champion in the decathlon, beating future world record holder Pekka Penttila. Four years later he returned to get a bronze medal behind Penttila. As a combined event athlete, he also has produced medal winning results in a range of other events, primarily jumping events. He won the world championship in the high jump in 1995, 2005, 2009, and 2015, while getting bronze in 1991 and 1999. He won the long jump in 2009 and 2015, with a bronze in 1999. He also picked up a silver in the triple jump and shot put in 2009, with bronze medals in 2005 and 2015.

Windolf was involved in Masters athletics since at least 1980, when he won a bronze medal in the high jump at the European Championships at the age of 56. With results across seven age groups, he is ranked the #6 long jumper in European history. Based on the age graded scale he has averaged a comparative 7.33 m (24 ft 1/2 in) throughout his career. On a similar average, he is ranked #5 in the high jump, averaging 2.08 m (6 ft 9 3/4 in) across 8 age divisions. As of 2006, he was tied for the European record in the M80 pole vault, set while winning the European Veterans Athletics Championships in Aarhus, Denmark.

He began participating in athletics and gymnastics at the age of 10. During World War II he was wounded, with extensive shrapnel to his lower jaw. But the injury, taking him out of the war, perhaps saved his athletic future. Into his 90s, he trained three days a week. He returned to the Championships because "there are great friendships. And it is always a pleasure to meet again." Windolf died in November 2018 at the age of 94.
