= Ida Keeling =

American athlete (1915–2021)

Personal information
- Nationality: American
- Born: Ida Olivia Potter; May 15, 1915
- Died: August 28, 2021 (aged 106)
- Height: 4 ft 6 in (137 cm)
- Weight: 83 lb (38 kg)

Sport
- Country: USA
- Sport: Track & Field
- Events: 60 meters (in 2011 in the 95-99 years division); 100 metres (on April 30, 2016, aged 100 in the M100 division)

Ida Olivia Keeling (née Potter, May 15, 1915 – August 28, 2021) was an American centenarian track and field athlete. Trained by her daughter Cheryl (Shelley) Keeling, herself a world record holder, Ida set Masters records in 60 meter and 100 meter distances for women in the 95-99 and 100-plus age groups.

She was featured in the HBO documentary If You're Not in the Obit, Eat Breakfast, and on Our America with Lisa Ling on the Oprah Winfrey Network.

== Sports records ==
=== 60 metres ===
In 2011, at 95 years old, Keeling set the world record in her age group for running 60 meters at 29.86 seconds at a track meet in Manhattan.

On February 24, 2018, Keeling set a world record in the 60-meter dash event at the Imperial Dade Track Classic, with a time of 58.34 seconds in the 100 to 104 age group.

=== 100 metres ===
In 2012, Keeling set the W95 American record in the 100-meter dash at the USATF Eastern Regional Open Championships with a time of 51.85. She was 97 years old at the time, which made her the oldest American female sprinter.

In 2014, at the 2014 Gay Games, Keeling set the fastest known time by a 99-year-old woman for the 100-meter dash at 59.80 seconds; at the time the relevant USA Track & Field webpage did not include a 100-meter record for US women older than the 90–94 age division.

On April 30, 2016, Keeling became the first woman in history to complete a 100-meter run at the age of 100. Her time of 1:17.33 was witnessed by a crowd of 44,469 at the 2016 Penn Relays.

== Personal life ==
Keeling's parents, Osborne and Mary Potter, emigrated to the United States from the island of Anegada in the British Virgin Islands. She was raised in Harlem, New York.

Keeling's mother died when Ida was young and her husband died of a heart attack when she was 42. She had four children, two of whom, Charles and Donald, died in drug-related killings in 1978 and 1980 respectively. Her elder daughter, Laura, worked as the CEO of two National Urban League affiliates. Her younger daughter, Shelley, is a lawyer and real estate investor who also coached for a local high school. Shelley also coached her mother and first convinced her to run in a "mini-run" at the age of 67.

In the book Can’t Nothing Bring Me Down: Chasing Myself in the Race against Time (2018), by Ida Keeling and Anita Diggs, Ida explained the secret to her health and fitness, stating she worked out 2-4 times a week and attended dancing classes. Her diet consisted of greens, fruit and cod liver oil, and she would have Hennessy with her coffee once a week.

She died in August 2021 at the age of 106.

== Additional ==
- List of centenarian masters track and field athletes
