= Stanisław Kowalski =

Polish athlete and supercentenarian (1910–2022)

Stanislaw Kowalski
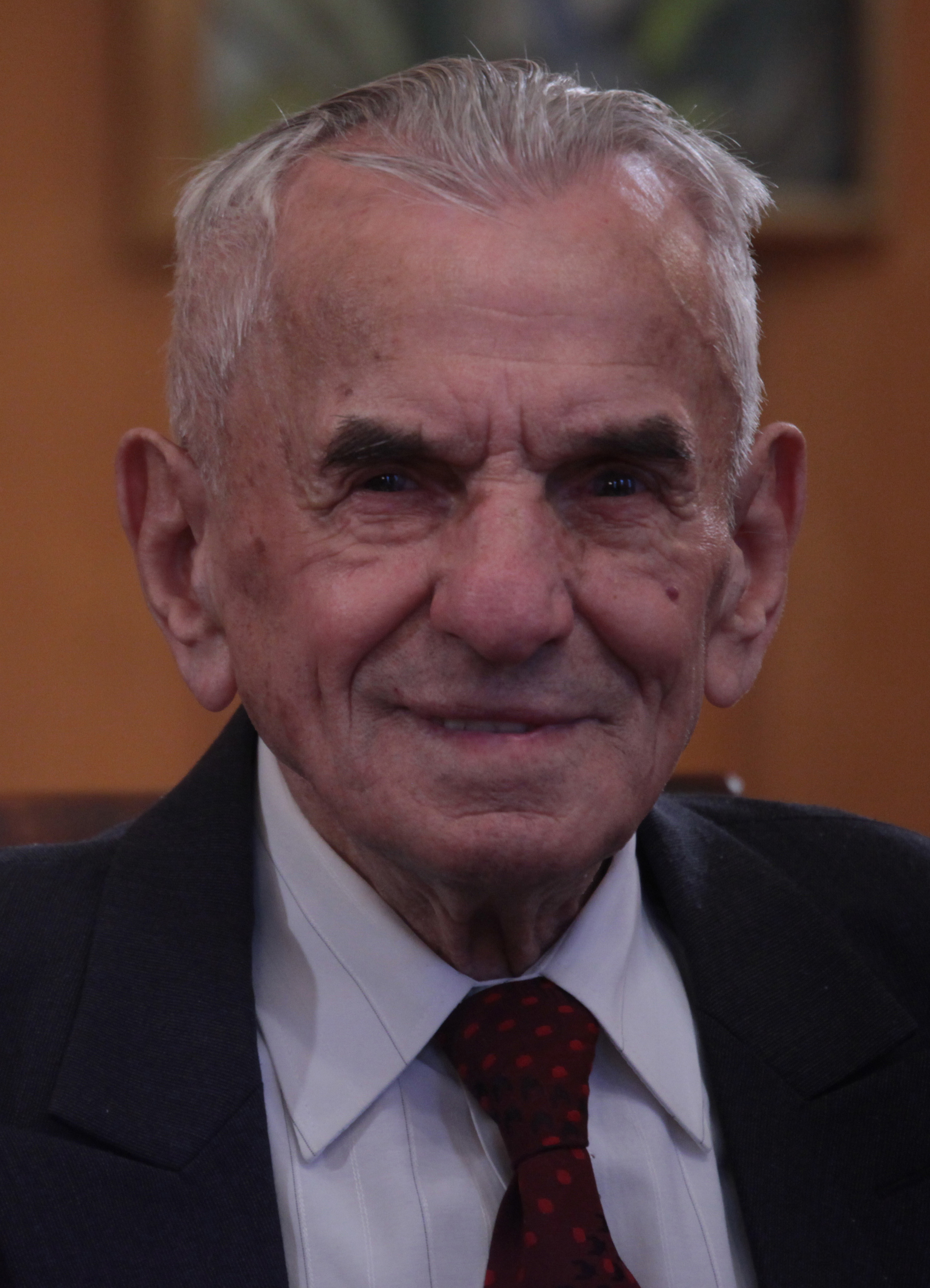
- Kowalski at age 105 in 2015

Personal information
- Born: 14 April 1910 Rogówek, Congress Poland
- Died: 5 April 2022 (aged 111 years, 356 days) Świdnica, Poland
- Occupation: Masters Athlete (M105 age division)

Sport
- Country: Poland
- Sport: sprinting; shot put; discus throw
- Events: Polish Veterans Championships in Toruń, 28 June 2015

Stanisław Kowalski (14 April 1910 – 5 April 2022) was a Polish supercentenarian masters athlete who, aged 105, became the oldest ever competing athlete in the newly formed M105 age division (ages 105–109) in sprinting, shot put, and discus throw.

== Early life ==
Kowalski was born on 14 April 1910, in the village of Rogówek, then part of Congress Poland within the Russian Empire, where he lived until the end of the 1930s. After his marriage, he moved to Brzeźnica. In 1952, due to the broadening of the boundaries of the military training ground, he had to move out of his newly built house and live in Lower Silesia, in the village of Krzydlina Wielka, where he ran a small farm and worked as a railroad lineman. He lived in Świdnica from 1979 until his death. Kowalski's mother lived to be 99. For decades, Kowalski rode to work on a bicycle regardless of the weather outside.

== Masters athlete career ==
When he competed at the Polish Veterans Championships on 28 June 2015 in Toruń, Poland, he became the world's oldest athlete. On that day, Kowalski ran the 100 metres in 34.50, put the shot 4.27 m (14 ft 0 in) and threw the discus 7.50 m (24 ft 7 1/4 in).

By competing in those events, he surpassed the accomplishments of American John Whittemore, who competed at 104 years 10 months. By virtue of his age being beyond 105 years old, he necessitated the creation of a new age division for World Masters Athletics, the M105 division was created and he was the only member to have competed. Thus all of his performances are world records. Hidekichi Miyazaki, a Japanese M100 sprinter, turned 105 on 22 September 2015 and two days later joined Kowalski as the second competitor in the division, although Kowalski was 77 days older when he competed. (Note: Guinness World Records has not certified Kowalski's record, but done Miyazaki's.) Miyazaki died on 23 January 2019.

Aged 104, Kowalski was lauded as the oldest person in Europe to run 100m after running a race in Wrocław, Poland, on 10 May 2014. He finished in 32.79 seconds, beating the previous record holder, aged 96 at the time, by over a second. He credited his longevity to never going to the physician and doing whatever he wanted. He also said not to eat much during the evening.

== Longevity ==
He became the oldest living man in Poland after the death of 108-year-old Józef Żurek on 20 March 2018. He died on 5 April 2022, aged 111 years and 356 days.

== World records ==
WMA OUTDOOR RECORDS - MEN
Age group	Discipline	Time	Wind	Distance	Date
M105	100m	34.50 sec	-0.1		June 27, 2015
M105	Discus			7.5 m	June 27, 2015

== See also ==
- List of centenarian masters track and field athletes
