= Takashi Shimokawara =

Japanese masters athlete

Personal information
- Born: July 25, 1906
- Died: March 11, 2011 (aged 104) Kamaishi, Japan
- Occupation: Master athlete

Sport
- Country: Japan
- Sport: shot put, discus, javelin

Takashi Shimokawara (July 25, 1906 – March 11, 2011) was a Japanese centenarian from Kamaishi, Iwate. He is the current M100 world record holder in the shot put, discus and javelin throw. He also holds the M95 Japanese national record in the javelin, set when he was at the age of 100. He was killed during the 2011 Tōhoku earthquake and tsunami at the age of 104.

Mr. Shimokawara would have a daily exercise routine that included a jog, press ups, squat thrusts and horizontal leg raises. He took up Masters athletics in 2004, at the age of 98.

The most important thing of all is to stay supple and flexible. The moment you will be most stiff is when you die – you never get stiffer than that. So you’ve got to sleep well, eat well and keep moving.
