= Rich Busa =

American long-distance runner

Richard Busa
- Born: October 30, 1929 (age 96)
- Occupation: Runner
- Known for: running, Busa Bushwhack

Richard Busa (born October 30, 1929) is an amateur runner from Marlborough, Massachusetts who has run in over 70 marathons and 61 ultra marathons. He ran the Vermont 100, which is 100 miles nonstop, at age 72, becoming the oldest person to complete the race.

== Biography ==
Busa attended Boston University. He was 53 years of age when he ran his first marathon. He also dropped out of his first race in 1948. Busa pitched for a Minor League Baseball team in Texas in 1950, then served in the U.S. Army for three years during the Korean War; for his service he was decorated with the Silver Star.

In addition to marathons, Busa has raced in over 60 snowshoe races. He is a local celebrity in Massachusetts. A 10- or 5.3-mile race named after him, the Busa Bushwhack Trail Race, has been held annually at Callahan State Park in Framingham since 2003.
