= Throws pentathlon =

Combined track and field event

The throws pentathlon also called the weight pentathlon is a combined event in track and field. Like all pentathlon events, it consists of five events; the four Olympic throwing events hammer throw, shot put, discus throw and javelin throw, plus the weight throw. Along with the Swedish Castorama (which includes only the four Olympic throws), it is the only combined event composed entirely of throwing events.

The event is a full World Championship event at the World Masters Athletics Championships and World Masters Athletics keeps world records for the event. There are domestic competitions all over the world. The oldest competitor to complete a throws pentathlon is Ruth Frith at the age of 101 years, 7 months and 24 days.

== Events ==
There is no difference between the events for either gender, however all gender and age division of masters athletics have different implement specifications, meaning older competitors and women throw lighter implements than younger men. Each athlete gets three attempts in each event, the best mark of each of those attempts is given performance points based on the age graded tables from World Masters Athletics. The current tables were modeled in 2010. Points calculators are available on line.

== Ultraweight pentathlon ==
Similar to the throws pentathlon is the ultraweight pentathlon, consisting of events usually spun from a circle. It starts with the Weight throw, then adds four more ultra weight throws increasing in size starting with the "Superweight throw." The exact rules for these events have been specified in the United States but have not yet been adopted on a global basis.
