= Women's athletics in Australia =

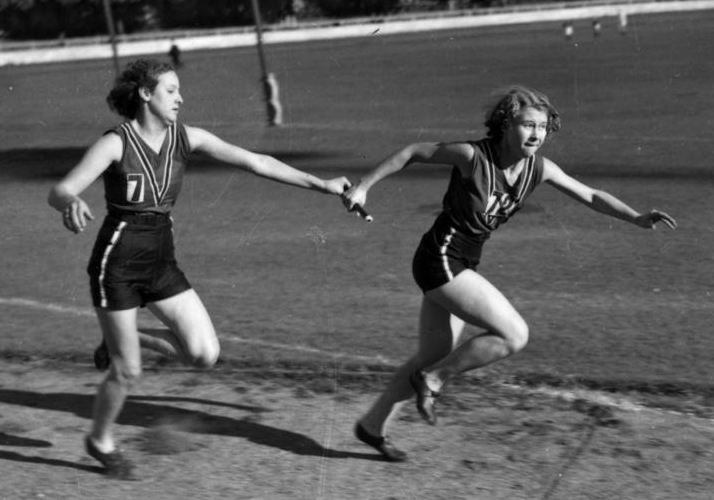
- Runners in a relay race, Brisbane, 1939 Val Weaver and Vera Askew passing the baton in a relay race, 1939.
- Country: Australia
- National team: Australia

While not being urged to avoid competition, women had few opportunities to compete in sport in Australia until the 1880s. After that date, new sporting facilities were being built around the country and many new sport clubs were created. Athletic events were being held in schools in Australia by the early part of the twentieth century. The Glennie School in Toowoomba was one school to host races for girls during their annual girls' sport day. During the 1920s, girls were able to run while wearing bloomers, instead of skirts. The first meeting for women's athletics took place in 1926 and was organised by the NSWAAA. The purpose of the meeting was to determine if it would be possible to send women to compete in the 1928 Summer Olympics based on merit. Only one female athlete was determined to be good enough to send. That was E.F. Robinson. The first women's national athletics body designed to govern the sport in Australia was founded in 1932 and was called the Australian Women's Amateur Athletic Union. It was designed to oversee state organisations in Victoria (1929), Queensland (1921), New South Wales (1932) and South Australia. (1932) The first Australian woman to travel overseas to compete was E.F. Robinson, who went to the 1928 Summer Olympics where she ran in the 100-metres. She came in third and was the only Australian female on the 1928 Australian Olympic team.

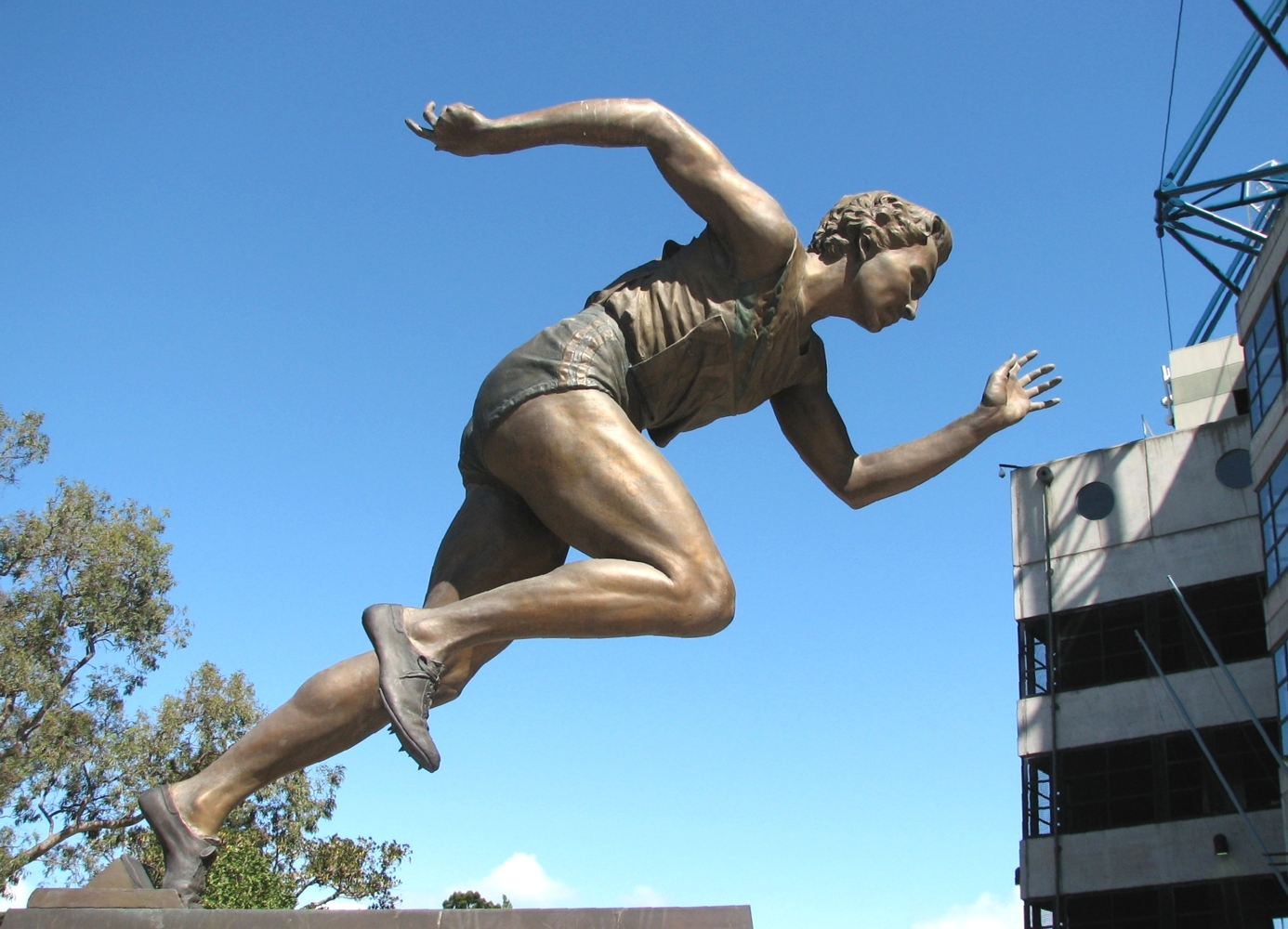
Statue of Shirley Strickland outside the Melbourne Cricket Ground

In 1934, the Victorian Women's Centennial Sports Carnival was held. The event was organised by the Victorian Women's Amateur Sports Council and held at the Melbourne Cricket Grounds. The purpose was to increase women's interest in sport by providing them opportunities to play. Sports that were included on the programme included cricket, field hockey, women's basketball, bowls, rowing, swimming, athletics, rifle shooting, baseball, golf, tennis and badminton. There were over 1,000 bowlers involved over the course a week. Cricket featured a match versus a visiting English side. Women's basketball featured a Victorian side playing against a representative all Australian side. There was a day for watersports such as swimming and rowing. A tennis tournament was held. A field hockey tournament featuring Australian, Kiwi and Fijian teams was played.

In 1935, a decision was made to allow women to compete in the 1938 Empire Games. The decision was made that year that the Australians were to host the event and they were the ones who would determine what events would be competed. The women's events that were to be included were swimming and athletics, events that Australia was to dominate in.

The second World War was disruptive to women's athletics in Australia. Some runners players, such as Shirley Strickland, joined up to help the war effort.

Australian women's sports had an advantage over many other women's sport organisations around the world in the period after World War II. Women's sport organisations had largely remained intact and were holding competitions during the war period. This structure survived in the post war period. Women's sport were not hurt because of food rationing, petrol rationing, population disbursement, and other issues facing post-war Europe.

During the 1950s, Australian women dominated the athletics competitions at the Empire Games.

Australians have competed in the British Athletics Championship and done well. In 1962, J. Berretta won at the mile. In 1961 and 1962, B. Moore won at the 80 metre hurdles. Historically, Australia's female athletics competitors have outperformed their male counterparts. They have won more Olympic medals. Their events are better organised.

At the 1974 Commonwealth Games, Raelene Boyle won two gold medals: 100 metres and 200 metres sprint medals. Australia won other athletics medals at these games. They won a gold medal in the 4 x 100 relay. Runners on the relay team included Boyle, Denise Robertson, Jenny Lamy and Robyn Boak. Charlene Rendina won a gold medal in the 800 metres. Petra Rivers won a gold medal in javelin.

== Bibliography ==
- Department of Sport, Recreation and Tourism; Australian Sport Commission (1985). Australian Sport, a profile. Canberra, Australia: Australian Government Publish Service. ISBN 0-644-03667-2.
- Howell, Max; Howell, Reet; Brown, David W. (1989). The Sporting Image, A pictorial history of Queenslanders at play. Brisbane: University of Queensland Press. ISBN 0-7022-2206-2.
- Pollard, Jack (1968). AMPOL book of Australian Sporting Records. Sydney: The Pollard Publishing Co. OCLC 71140.
- Stell, Marion K. (1991). Half the Race, A history of Australian women in sport. North Ryde, Australia: HarperCollins. ISBN 0-207-16971-3.
