= John Whittemore =

American athlete (1899–2005)

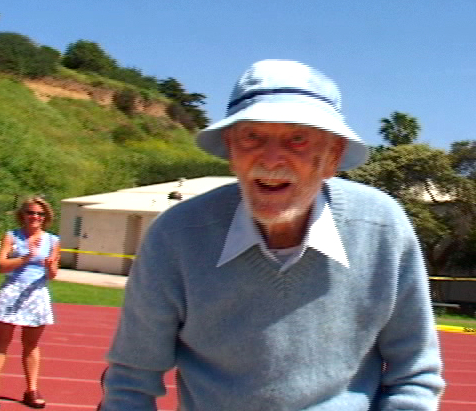
- John Whittemore after throwing the shot put at age 104 in the Santa Barbara Easter Relays, at Santa Barbara City College, Santa Barbara, California.

Personal information
- Born: November 20, 1899 Montecito, California, United States
- Died: April 13, 2005 (aged 105)
- Education: Santa Barbara High School, Stanford University
- Occupation(s): Track and Field Masters Athlete

Sport
- Country: USA
- Sport: Javelin - Discus
- Event: University of California, Santa Barbara Club West Master meet o October 5, 2004, 8 competing at 104 years Whittlemore was then the worlds oldest athlete

John Whittemore (November 20, 1899 – April 13, 2005) was an American centenarian from Montecito, California, who was previously credited as being the "world's oldest athlete" (held until June 28, 2015, before being surpassed by Stanisław Kowalski) A long time Masters Track athlete, his last competition was on October 5, 2004, just six weeks before his 105th birthday. He threw the javelin and discus on that occasion in the Club West Masters Meet held at the University of California, Santa Barbara.

== Biography ==
Whittemore said of his unique position in the athletic world "If I don't drop it on my foot, I set a world record." Had he competed after his birthday it would have necessitated a new age division in a sport divided by five-year age groups, a situation Whittemore continued to train for. When Whittemore threw the shot put, earlier on March 28, 2004, at the Santa Barbara Easter Relays, (at age 104 years, 4 months), it was covered on Good Morning America on March 29, 2004.

The only other reported instance of a 104-year-old participating in athletic events was Norwegian skier Herman "Jackrabbit" Smith-Johannsen, reported in 1979 and that was not in an organized event. The next active claimant to the title was Australian Ruth Frith, who competed in throwing events at the 2009 World Masters Games in Sydney. She was still active when celebrating her 104th birthday in August 2013, however she died in March 2014. Everett Hosack, who Jay Leno announced as the "world's oldest athlete" at the time, famously participated in the Penn Relays and USATF National Indoor Championships at age 101. On June 28, 2015, Stanisław Kowalski became the first athlete to compete in the M105 category.

Whittemore attended Santa Barbara High School, where he was a long and triple jumper, and graduated in 1917. He often described riding to high school on horseback. Later he attended Stanford University, where he played baseball and was an outstanding tennis player. He spent several decades competing for the Club West Track Club, which named an annual award for him.

== See also ==
- List of centenarian masters track and field athletes
