= Ruth Frith =

Australian masters athlete

Ruth Frith (OAM)
Personal information
- Born: Ruth Pursehouse; August 23, 1909 Goulburn, New South Wales
- Died: February 28, 2014 (aged 104) Algester, Queensland, Australia
- Education: Goulburn High School
- Occupations: Masters athlete; sports coach; sport officiator; club executive and secretary
- Children: Helen Frith (daughter)

Sport
- Country: AUS
- Sport: Throws pentathlon
- Events: Master World Record in: W85 Triple Jump; W100 Shot Put; W100 Discus; W100 hammer throw; W100 weight throw; W100 javelin; at the 2009 World Masters Games aged 100

Ruth Pauline Frith OAM (born Ruth Pursehouse, 23 August 1909 – 28 February 2014) was an Australian centenarian masters athlete, and was the oldest active athlete. She is the current holder of the masters world record in numerous events including the W85 Triple Jump, W100 Shot Put, Discus, Hammer Throw, Weight Throw and Javelin Throw and was the oldest competitor to complete a Throws Pentathlon and thus holds the record in that event. In younger age divisions, she held many more records that have been surpassed.

Her famous quote for longevity:

“Don’t eat vegetables, because I never eat vegetables. I know people that like diets that will scream at me, (but) don’t eat vegetables. I never have.”

She was the mother of Australian Olympic jumper and pentathlete Helen Frith, who under her married name of Searle is also a multiple masters world record holder.

== Early life ==
Ruth Pursehouse was born in Goulburn, New South Wales. She attended Goulburn High School, a NSW selective school, and was originally planning on becoming a solicitor. She won the state title in the 100 yard dash at the Sydney Cricket Ground and played field hockey as a girl. It was on a hockey trip to Dubbo that she met her future husband Ray Frith. They were married in 1933. She became active in sports administration as a young girl.

== Sports athlete ==
An accomplished musician with the Sydney Conservatorium of Music, she served as the student representative to the Sports Union for Athletics. After playing with the Gouldburn Hockey Club, she served on the team committee. Her husband's work as a civil engineer took them to Darwin where she was Secretary of the Darwin Golf Club. After 5 years in Lithgow, where Ray surveyed the athletics fields for Dubbo, Orange, Bathurst and Lithgow the couple lived in Sydney, where they were the power couple of athletics officiating. She was a leader with the Women's Amateur Athletics Association of NSW serving as Country Secretary, Records Officer, State Executive, and Secretary of the Northern Suburbs Women's club and Mid-west club. She also coached long jumping, in which her daughter excelled. She took up being an active athlete in 1982 at the age of 73.

== Recognition ==
Prior to her sporting career, she worked with the Northern Territory Indigenous Community in which she was given the Queen Elizabeth II Coronation Medal in 1953. She was awarded the Medal of the Order of Australia in recognition of service to athletics in the 1994 Australia Day Honours, and in 2000 was a recipient of the Australian Sports Medal.

== Later life ==
She moved to Queensland to be with her daughter. Helen estimates she set as many as 25 world records in her career. Ruth was featured in the ABC documentary about and entitled the 100+ Club.

She died in Algester in February 2014, aged 104.

== Additional ==
- List of centenarian masters track and field athletes
