= Leland McPhie =

American track and field athlete

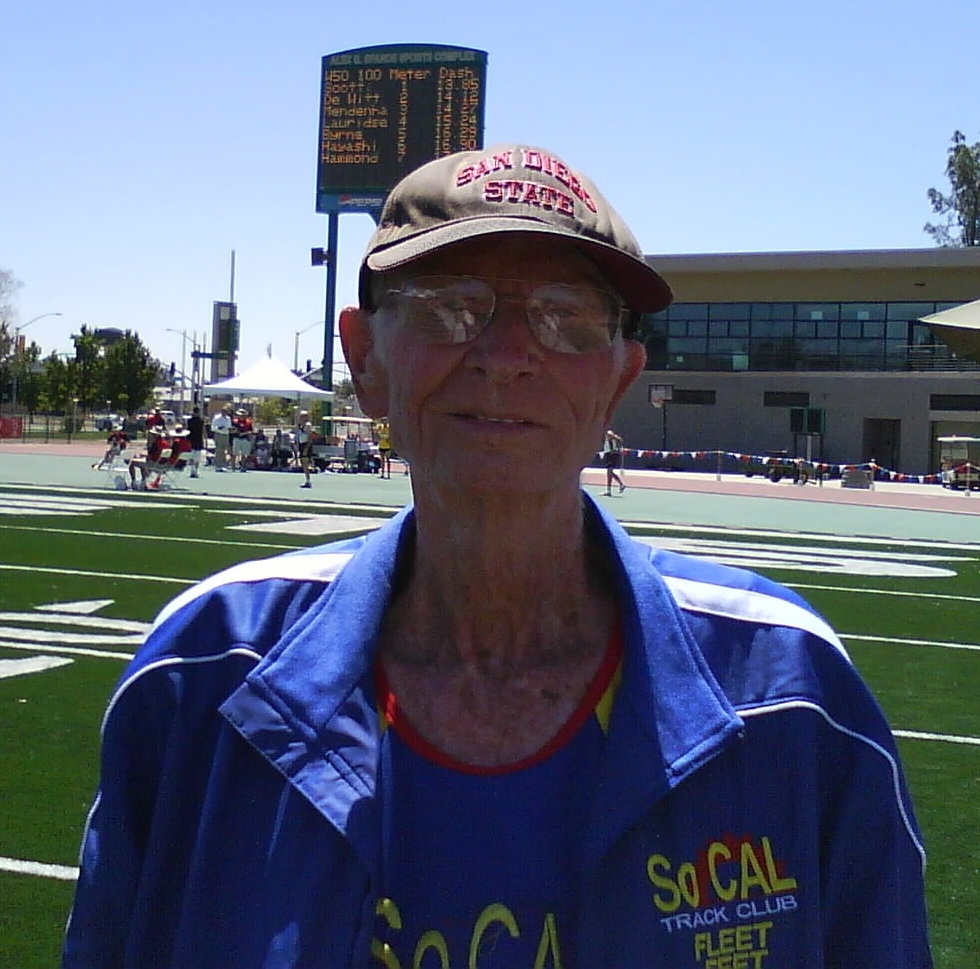
- Leland McPhie at the USATF Masters Championships in Sacramento, California

Personal information
- Full name: Leland McPhie
- Nationality: American
- Born: March 10, 1914 Salt Lake City, Utah
- Died: September 3, 2015 (aged 101) San Diego, California

Sport
- Country: United States of America
- Sport: Athletics
- Events: long jump, triple jump
- College team: San Diego State University

Leland McPhie (March 10, 1914 – September 3, 2015) was an American centenarian track and field athlete. He has found success in Masters athletics competitions. He also holds the currently ratified M95 American records in the long jump and triple jump. Just four days after his 100th birthday, competing in the USATF Masters Indoor Championships, McPhie was the first centenarian athlete to attempt the high jump, though he failed to clear the bar.

McPhie's first experience in the sport of track and field dates to his days at Colton Union High School in Colton, California where he taught himself to pole vault with a bamboo pole. In 1935 he set the school record at San Bernardino Valley College that lasted until the inception of fiberglass vaulting poles that radically changed the event in the 1960s. He continued to San Diego State College where he set the school record in the 220 yard dash and long jump in 1936. To this day, the jump is still ranked #9 in school history, a history that includes two Olympic gold medalists in the long jump, Willie Steele and Arnie Robinson.

McPhie joined the Army to fight in World War II, returning to San Diego State to complete his degree. From 1940 to 1969 he worked for the San Diego County Sheriff's Department, by 1954 becoming the youngest to attain the rank of captain. During the Vietnam War, he worked for the State Department and picked up the game of tennis. Still decades later he joined a tennis competition at the local Senior Olympics and noticed a track meet going on associated with the event. Since joining in that day, he has won over 200 gold medals and has set numerous American and world records.

Widowed in 2000, he survived open heart surgery in 2004 and a couple of forms of cancer. From his recollection, he has three living children, five or six grandchildren and "about 30″ great-grandchildren. He died from a rare form of E. coli bacterial infection.

== Additional ==
List of centenarian masters track and field athletes
