= Julia Hawkins =

American centenarian athlete (1916–2024)

Personal information
- Born: Julia Welles; February 10, 1916 Lake Geneva, Wisconsin, U.S.
- Died: October 22, 2024 (aged 108) Baton Rouge, Louisiana, U.S.
- Spouse: Murray Hawkins (m. 1942; died 2013)
- Children: 4

Sport
- Country: United States of America
- Sport: Track and field
- Event: 100m dash

Julia Hawkins (née Welles; February 10, 1916 – October 22, 2024) was an American sprinter and cyclist. She took up track and field after turning 100, and set world records in the 100-meter dash in her age category.

== Early life and education ==
Julia Welles was born in Lake Geneva, Wisconsin, on February 10, 1916. When she was a few months old, her family moved to Ponchatoula, Louisiana, where they ran a summer resort.

She attended Louisiana State University, where she studied teaching. She worked three jobs to fund her college education. After graduating college in 1938, she taught four grades in a one-room school on a banana plantation in Honduras. She returned to the United States with a pet monkey.

== Career ==
In 2016, she self-published the memoir It's Been Wondrous!, which she had handwritten over the course of 30 years.

Hawkins was interested in sport throughout her life, and took up competitive cycling at age 75. She competed in the National Senior Games as a cyclist for around a decade, beginning in 1995, winning six gold medals in their 5K and 10K cycling races.

She began running when she was 100, after her children encouraged her to enter the Louisiana Senior Games. At the 2016 Louisiana Senior Games, she completed the 50-meter sprint in 19.07 and biked in the 5K cycling race.

At the 2017 National Senior Games, she won the women's 100+ 100-meter sprint, with a record time of 36.62 seconds, and finished the 50-meter sprint in 18.31 seconds. In July 2017, she competed in the 100-meter sprint in the 100–104 age category of the USA Track and Field Outdoors Masters Championships, finishing with a time of 39.62.

In 2019, she participated in the National Senior Games, where she competed in shot put and the 50-meter and 100-meter sprints.

In 2021, she became the first female runner to record a time in the 100-meter sprint in the 105+ age category, with a time of 1:02.95.

== Personal life ==
Hawkins met her husband, Murray Hawkins (d. 2013) at an Episcopal Church party as a freshman at LSU. Murray was working as a physicist at Pearl Harbor in Hawaii when it was bombed in 1941. Following the attack, Julia and Murray married over the telephone on November 29, 1942, while he continued to work in Hawaii. The couple had four children. While her husband was deployed, Hawkins worked as an educator in Ponchatoula, cycling seven miles each day to the school.

In 1949, Hawkins and her husband built a home in Baton Rouge, Louisiana. Hawkins was an "avid gardener" who grew bonsai in her backyard.

Hawkins lived in Baton Rouge until her death there on October 22, 2024, at the age of 108.
