= Erwin Jaskulski =

- Ервін Яскульський
- Born: Ervin Yaskulskyi; September 24, 1902; Chernivtsi, Russian Empire
- Died: March 10, 2006 (aged 103); Honolulu, Hawaii, U.S.
- Occupation: Accountant

Erwin Jaskulski (Ukrainian: Ервін Яскульський, romanized: Ervin Yaskulskyi, September 24, 1902 – March 10, 2006) was a Ukrainian-American track athlete. Born in Chernivtsi, Russian Empire, he was a resident of Honolulu from 1954 until his death.

== Biography ==
For a period, Jaskulski was the world record holder for the 100 meters, 200 meters and 400 meters in the 95- to 99-year-old and the 100-plus age groups. However, the record for 100 meter for 100 plus age group, which he set on November 16, 2002, at 36.19 seconds, was later broken by Philip Rabinowitz who finished in a time of 30.86 seconds. According to fitness guru and friend Gilad Janklowicz, Jaskulski was a fan of classical music and his philosophy was "to be happy and joyful in life."

A retired accountant, Jaskulski worked as a comptroller at KHON-TV. He trained by doing chin ups and running down the hallways of his apartment building. With failing eyesight, he was forced to stop the workouts shortly before his death.

In the February 2002 edition of the National Masters News magazine he was listed as an Austrian citizen living in Honolulu.

He never gave an interview in his life. Both Jay Leno and David Letterman asked him to be on their shows but he turned the idea down.

Jaskulski died on March 10, 2006, aged 103. He was survived by two sons living in Austria.

== See also ==
List of centenarian masters track and field athletes
