= Donald Pellmann =

American masters athlete (1915–2020)

Donald Pellman

Personal information
- Born: August 12, 1915 Milwaukee, Wisconsin, U.S.
- Died: October 11, 2020 (aged 105) Santa Clara, California, U.S.
- Occupation: Masters athlete

Sport
- Country: USA
- Sport: Track and field
- Events: Long jump; high jump; discus; pole vaulting; triple jump; discus; shot put; sprinting; javelin

Donald Pellmann (August 12, 1915 – October 11, 2020) was an American centenarian multi world-record-setting masters athlete. He held the current M90 world record (for men aged 90 or above) in the long jump, high jump, discus throw, and indoor pole vault. Additionally, he also held the American records in the 100 metres, triple jump, shot put, and javelin throw. He lived in an assisted senior living facility in Santa Clara, California.

== Biography ==
Born in Milwaukee, Wisconsin, he grew up during the Great Depression. He had high jumped in high school, where he claimed he was "not great," but work soon took priority. He was a tool and die maker and remained at work during World War II. In 1970, he retired from his job at a subsidiary of General Electric. Other than occasional bowling, softball and golf, he was not involved in athletics for 58 years. Meanwhile, he watched his more athletic friends from the football team have failing ankles, knees and hearts. Pellmann never had those kinds of ailments.

Video on YouTube record day Video on YouTube 100 meters record

On September 20, 2015, Pellmann set five world records at the San Diego Senior Games. Competing in the 100 and older category, he ran the 100-meter dash in 26.99 seconds, beating the previous age-group world record held by Japan's Hidekichi Miyazaki by 2.84 seconds. Pellmann became the first centenarian to clear an official height in the high jump. Pellmann also set records in the shot put, discus throw and long jump. Later that week, Pellmann was named USATF "Athlete of the Week".

In 2018, his wife Marge, to whom he had been married for 71 years, died. In September 2020, Pellmann had hip surgery performed on him after a bad fall. On October 11, 2020, Pellmann died aged 105.

In 2020 he was voted to the USATF Masters Hall of Fame.

== Additional ==
List of centenarian masters track and field athletes
