= Orville Rogers =

American pilot (1917–2019)

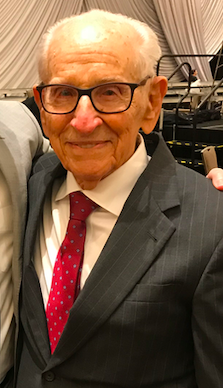
- Rogers in 2017
- Born: Orville Curtis Rogers; November 28, 1917; Hubbard, Texas, U.S.
- Died: November 14, 2019 (aged 101); Dallas, Texas, U.S.
- Education: University of Oklahoma
- Occupation: Pilot with Braniff Airways
- Spouse: Esther Beth Shannon (m. 1943; died 2008)

Orville Curtis Rogers (November 28, 1917 – November 14, 2019) was an American pilot, military veteran, and competitive runner.

== Early life ==
Rogers was born to Stephen Alfred Rogers and Lillie Leona Johnston at home in Hubbard, Texas. The family moved to Okemah, Oklahoma soon after. Orville's sister, Veva Jean, was born in 1922. After short stays in Oklahoma City and Edmond, Oklahoma, Stephen left, and Lillie moved her family back to Okemah to live with her parents, Rueben Jefferson Daniel Johnston and Mary Elizabeth Gilbreath. When Orville was 10, Rueben moved the family to Sulphur, Oklahoma. Lillie had five brothers, including William (Bill) Green Johnston and Ralph A. Johnston. Both found success in the oil industry. Orville graduated with a degree in Mechanical Engineering from the University of Oklahoma in 1940, where he met his future wife, Esther Beth Shannon (class of 1941). Rogers was a veteran of WWII and the Korean War as a member of the U.S. Army Air Corps and U.S. Air Force, respectively.

== Career ==
Based in Dallas, Orville Rogers was a Braniff International Airways commercial pilot for more than three decades. He was hired by Braniff Airways, Inc., in 1945 and retired after 32 years of service in 1977. During the late 1960s, he flew the famed McDonnell-Douglas DC-8-62 Intercontinental four-engine jet over the company's vast route system between the US Mainland and South America. His favorite Braniff aircraft was the Boeing 727-200 Trijet airliner.

Braniff Airways Foundation awarded Mr. Rogers, its coveted Braniff Airways Foundation Hall of Fame Award. He was inducted into the Hall of Fame in June 2017. In 2020, Braniff Airways Foundation will place Captain Rogers name along with the other Hall of Fame Recipients on a special plaque at The University of Texas at Dallas History of Aviation Collection in Richardson, Texas.

== Competitive running ==
Rogers set multiple world records, shown in the List of world records in masters athletics. At the age of 50, Rogers took up running after reading the book Aerobics by Dr. Kenneth H. Cooper. Rogers credited Dr. Cooper with saving his life, "at least once, probably twice," first by kickstarting his running career, and again when Dr. Cooper discovered blockage in his heart during a Cooper test. Orville competed in Masters athletics races, setting records at the age of 90 and 95. In 2015, Orville teamed up with other nonagenarians to set multiple relay running records. He made national news after a video of his sprint against then 92 year old Dixon Hemphill went viral. Rogers, 99 at the time, won the race by 0.05 seconds. To celebrate his 100th birthday, Orville and his family ran a combined 100 miles. He then set two 100-year-old age group records in the 60m at 19.13 and 400m at 4:16:90 while competing at the 2018 USATF Masters Indoor Championships. In 2020 was voted to the USATF Masters Hall of Fame.

== Later life and death ==
Orville, and his wife, were donors to many organizations, including Dallas Baptist University and the Frontiers of Flight Museum.

A heart condition was found in early 2019, for which he underwent surgery. Rogers died on November 14, 2019, while in hospice care at the age of 101.

== See also ==
- List of centenarian masters track and field athletes
