= 1995 World Masters Athletics Championships =

Coordinates: 42.9991427°N 78.7775225°W

- Dates: 13 - 23 July 1995
- Host city: Buffalo, New York, United States
- Venue: University at Buffalo Stadium
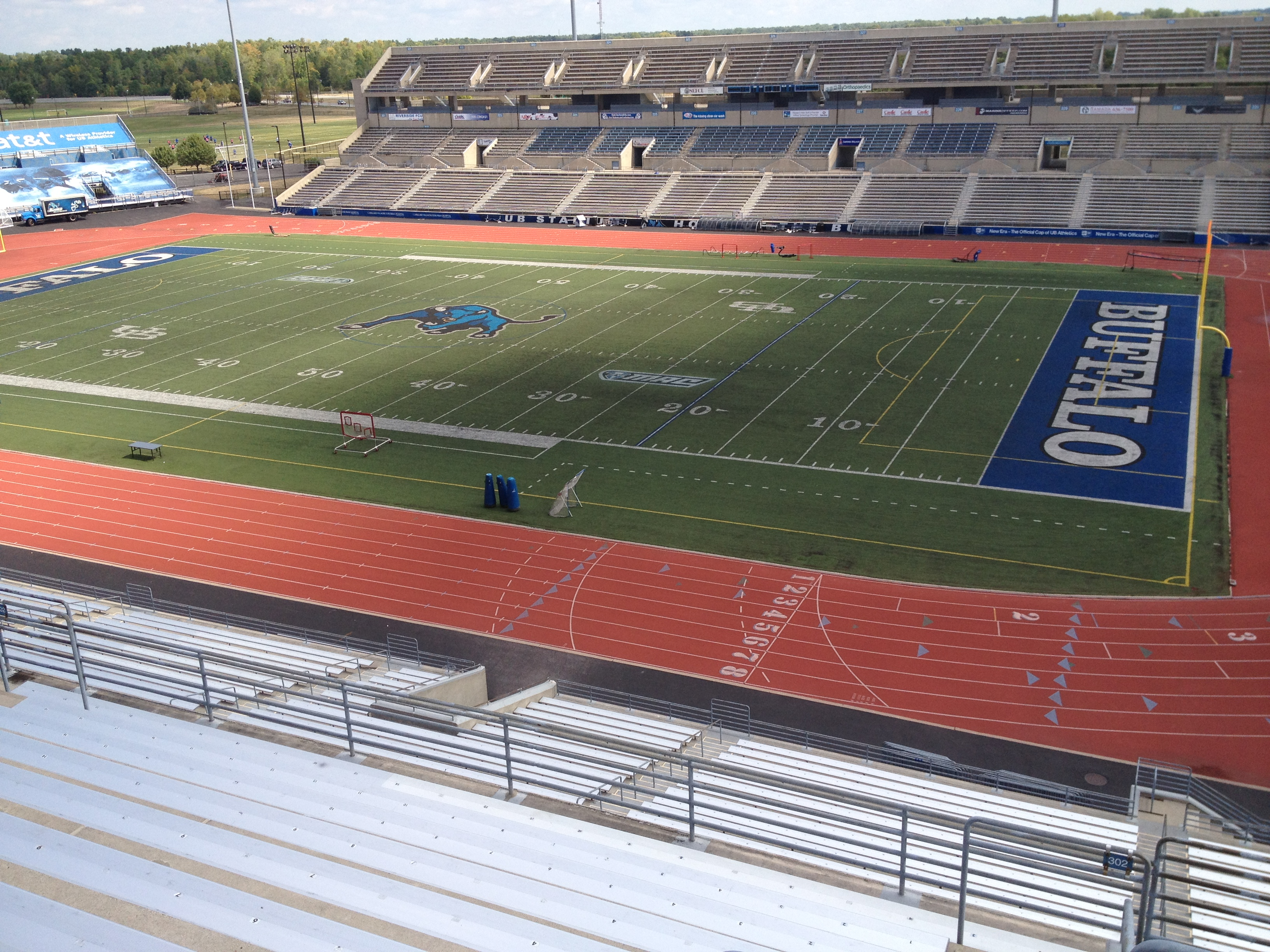
- Level: Masters
- Type: Outdoor
- Participation: 5335 athletes from 81 nations

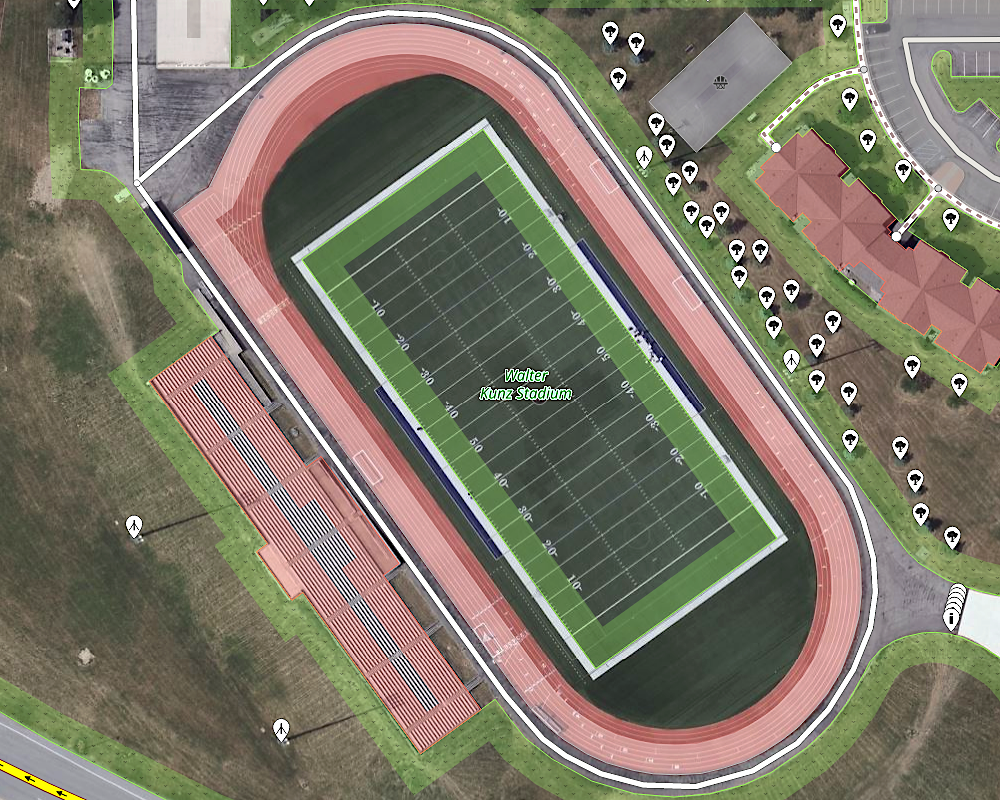
Walter Kunz Stadium

1995 World Masters Athletics Championships is the eleventh in a series of World Masters Athletics Outdoor Championships (called World Veterans Championships, World Veterans Athletic Championships, or World Veterans Games at the time) that took place in Buffalo, New York, United States from 13 to 23 July 1995.

The main venue was University at Buffalo Stadium, which had been built 2 years prior to host the 1993 World University Games. Supplemental venues included Walter Kunz Stadium, also located on the campus of University at Buffalo. American masters athlete Ruth Anderson (65), who had participated in all eleven Championships in this series, carried a friendship torch into the stadium to light an Olympic-style flame during opening ceremonies on Friday, 14 July.

This edition of masters athletics Championships had a minimum age limit of 35 years for women and 40 years for men.

The governing body of this series is World Association of Veteran Athletes (WAVA). WAVA was formed during meeting at the inaugural edition of this series at Toronto in 1975, then officially founded during the second edition in 1977, then renamed as World Masters Athletics (WMA) at the Brisbane Championships in 2001.

This Championships was organized by WAVA in coordination with a Local Organising Committee (LOC) of Vito J. Borrello, Neal Fatin, Robert Greene.

In addition to a full range of track and field events, non-stadia events included 10K Cross Country, 10K Race Walk (women), 20K Race Walk (men), and Marathon. This may be the hottest Championships in the series so far, with temperatures around 104 °F (40 °C). Due to a shortage of ambulances and dangers from heat exhaustion, some Cross Country races were postponed. Due to an accidental detour, the W55 Cross Country was run short of the 10K distance.

== Results ==
Past Championships results are archived at WMA. Additional archives are available from Museum of Masters Track & Field as a searchable pdf and in pdf newsletters from National Masters News.

Several masters world records were set at this Championships. World records for 1985 are from the list of World Records in the Museum of Masters Track & Field searchable pdf unless otherwise noted. Top 3 medal winners are listed only for selected age groups. World records are indicated by WR .

=== Women ===
| Event | Pos | Athlete | Country | Results |
|---|---|---|---|---|
| W50 100 Meters | 1st place, gold medalist(s) | Marge Allison | AUS | 13.06 WR |
| W55 100 Meters | 1st place, gold medalist(s) | Brunhilde Hoffmann | GER | 13.41 WR |
| W60 100 Meters | 1st place, gold medalist(s) | Irene Obera | USA | 13.51 WR |
| W50 200 Meters | 1st place, gold medalist(s) | Marge Allison | AUS | 26.56 WR |
| W55 200 Meters | 1st place, gold medalist(s) | Brunhilde Hoffmann | GER | 28.40 WR |
| W85 200 Meters | 1st place, gold medalist(s) | Judit Forero Geona | COL | 69.28 WR |
| W45 400 Meters | 1st place, gold medalist(s) | Mary Libal | USA | 56.82 WR |
| W50 400 Meters | 1st place, gold medalist(s) | Marge Allison | AUS | 58.51 WR |
| W55 400 Meters | 1st place, gold medalist(s) | Brunhilde Hoffmann | GER | 64.50 WR |
| W60 400 Meters | 1st place, gold medalist(s) | Irene Obera | USA | 67.80 WR |
| W60 800 Meters | 1st place, gold medalist(s) | Vicki Bigelow | USA | 2:46.20 WR |
| W70 800 Meters | 1st place, gold medalist(s) | Nina Naumenko | RUS | 3:13.33 WR |
| W60 1500 Meters | 1st place, gold medalist(s) | Vicki Bigelow | USA | 5:39.96 WR |
| W70 1500 Meters | 1st place, gold medalist(s) | Nina Naumenko | RUS | 6:14.52 WR |
| W60 80 Meters Hurdles | 1st place, gold medalist(s) | Corrie Roovers-van den Bosch | NED | 13.91 WR |
| W65 80 Meters Hurdles | 1st place, gold medalist(s) | Colleen Blair | NZL | 17.35 WR |
| W60 300 Meters Hurdles | 1st place, gold medalist(s) | Corrie Roovers-van den Bosch | NED | 53.05 WR |
| W40 400 Meters Hurdles | 1st place, gold medalist(s) | Maria Espina | ESP | 63.04 WR |
| W85 Long Jump | 1st place, gold medalist(s) | Ruth Frith | AUS | 2.08 WR |
| W45 Triple Jump | 1st place, gold medalist(s) | Akiko Oohinata | JPN | 11.98 WR |
| W40 High Jump | 1st place, gold medalist(s) | Carmen Karg | GER | 1.72 WR |
| W50 High Jump | 1st place, gold medalist(s) | Renate Vogen | GER | 1.53 WR |
| W80 High Jump | 1st place, gold medalist(s) | Shiela Evans | USA | 0.88 WR |
| W35 Pole Vault | 1st place, gold medalist(s) | Petra Henmann | GER | 3.00 WR |
| W40 Pole Vault | 1st place, gold medalist(s) | Marie LeJeune | FRA | 3.00 WR |
| W60 Shot Put | 1st place, gold medalist(s) | Sigrun Kofink | GER | 12.52 WR |
| W70 Shot Put | 1st place, gold medalist(s) | Hanna Kiehr | GER | 8.92 WR |
| W65 Discus Throw | 1st place, gold medalist(s) | Marianne Hamm | GER | 29.98 WR |
| W40 Hammer throw | 1st place, gold medalist(s) | Ana Edith Acuna | CHI | 42.72 WR |
| W55 Hammer throw | 1st place, gold medalist(s) | Helen Ray Searle | AUS | 45.86 WR |
| W60 Hammer throw | 1st place, gold medalist(s) | Jutta Schaefer | GER | 46.04 WR |
| W85 Hammer throw | 1st place, gold medalist(s) | Ruth Frith | AUS | 18.26 WR |
| W50 Javelin Throw | 1st place, gold medalist(s) | Mary Thomas | AUS | 48.56 WR |
| W50 4 x 100 Meters Relay | 1st place, gold medalist(s) | Anne-Kathrin Eriksen | GER | 53.41 WR |
| W50 4 x 100 Meters Relay | 1st place, gold medalist(s) | Friderun Kümmerle-Valk | GER | 53.41 WR |
| W50 4 x 100 Meters Relay | 1st place, gold medalist(s) | Doris Gallep | GER | 53.41 WR |
| W50 4 x 100 Meters Relay | 1st place, gold medalist(s) | Martha Behrendt | GER | 53.41 WR |
| W70 4 x 100 Meters Relay | 1st place, gold medalist(s) | Ingrid Lorenz | GER | 68.72 WR |
| W70 4 x 100 Meters Relay | 1st place, gold medalist(s) | Paula Schneiderhan | GER | 68.72 WR |
| W70 4 x 100 Meters Relay | 1st place, gold medalist(s) | Elizabeth Haule | GER | 68.72 WR |
| W70 4 x 100 Meters Relay | 1st place, gold medalist(s) | Anna Mangler | GER | 68.72 WR |
| W50 4 x 400 Meters Relay | 1st place, gold medalist(s) | Gerda Seibert | GER | 4:35.27 WR |
| W50 4 x 400 Meters Relay | 1st place, gold medalist(s) | Doris Gallep | GER | 4:35.27 WR |
| W50 4 x 400 Meters Relay | 1st place, gold medalist(s) | Hannelore Venn | GER | 4:35.27 WR |
| W50 4 x 400 Meters Relay | 1st place, gold medalist(s) | Friderun Kümmerle-Valk | GER | 4:35.27 WR |
| W60 4 x 400 Meters Relay | 1st place, gold medalist(s) | Janet Freeman | USA | 5:14.94 WR |
| W60 4 x 400 Meters Relay | 1st place, gold medalist(s) | Joyce Hals | USA | 5:14.94 WR |
| W60 4 x 400 Meters Relay | 1st place, gold medalist(s) | Rita Kerr | USA | 5:14.94 WR |
| W60 4 x 400 Meters Relay | 1st place, gold medalist(s) | Irene Obera | USA | 5:14.94 WR |
| W70 4 x 400 Meters Relay | 1st place, gold medalist(s) | Emilia de Fontán | COL | 7:07.90 WR |
| W70 4 x 400 Meters Relay | 1st place, gold medalist(s) | Anarita Pinto de Lugo | COL | 7:07.90 WR |
| W70 4 x 400 Meters Relay | 1st place, gold medalist(s) | Maria Suarez deBernal | COL | 7:07.90 WR |
| W70 4 x 400 Meters Relay | 1st place, gold medalist(s) | Mary Garcia de Lires | COL | 7:07.90 WR |
| W70 5K Race Walk | 1st place, gold medalist(s) | Margaret Walker | USA | 35:05.11 WR |

=== Men ===
==== M40 ====
| Event | Pos | Athlete | Country | Results |
|---|---|---|---|---|
| M40 100 Meters | 1st place, gold medalist(s) | Bill Collins | USA | 11.33 |
| M40 100 Meters | 2nd place, silver medalist(s) | Jesse Thomas | USA | 11.34 |
| M40 100 Meters | 3rd place, bronze medalist(s) | Rolf Gisler | SUI | 11.48 |
| M40 200 Meters | 1st place, gold medalist(s) | Rolf Gisler | SUI | 22.74 |
| M40 200 Meters | 2nd place, silver medalist(s) | Jesse Thomas | USA | 22.99 |
| M40 200 Meters | 3rd place, bronze medalist(s) | Anders Mathiesen | DEN | 23.11 |
| M40 200 Meters | 3rd place, bronze medalist(s) | Bill Collins | USA | 23.11 |
| M40 400 Meters | 1st place, gold medalist(s) | Rolf Gisler | SUI | 48.10 WR |
| M40 400 Meters | 2nd place, silver medalist(s) | Clifton McKenzie | USA | 48.79 |
| M40 400 Meters | 3rd place, bronze medalist(s) | Jesse Thomas | USA | 49.92 |
| M40 800 Meters | 1st place, gold medalist(s) | Terence Brown | RSA | 2:06.75 |
| M40 800 Meters | 2nd place, silver medalist(s) | David Wilcock | GBR | 2:06.80 |
| M40 800 Meters | 3rd place, bronze medalist(s) | Carlos Cabral (athlete) | POR | 2:06.81 |
| M40 1500 Meters | 1st place, gold medalist(s) | Alexandre Gonzalez | FRA | 3:57.68 |
| M40 1500 Meters | 2nd place, silver medalist(s) | Carlos Cabral (athlete) | POR | 3:59.12 |
| M40 1500 Meters | 3rd place, bronze medalist(s) | Terence Brown | RSA | 3:59.94 |
| M40 5000 Meters | 1st place, gold medalist(s) | Barry Harwick | USA | 15:08.80 |
| M40 5000 Meters | 2nd place, silver medalist(s) | Eduardo A Castellano | VEN | 15:12.77 |
| M40 5000 Meters | 3rd place, bronze medalist(s) | Marjan Krempl | SLO | 15:14.01 |
| M40 10000 Meters | 1st place, gold medalist(s) | Eduardo A Castellano | VEN | 31:32.60 |
| M40 10000 Meters | 2nd place, silver medalist(s) | Rainer Muhlberg | GER | 32:06.04 |
| M40 10000 Meters | 3rd place, bronze medalist(s) | Marjan Krempl | SLO | 32:18.10 |
| M40 5K Race Walk | 1st place, gold medalist(s) | Warrick Yeager | USA | 22:59.70 |
| M40 5K Race Walk | 2nd place, silver medalist(s) | Claudio Penolazzi | ITA | 23:13.79 |
| M40 5K Race Walk | 3rd place, bronze medalist(s) | Jürgen Albrecht | GER | 24:00.75 |
| M40 110 Meters Hurdles | 1st place, gold medalist(s) | Colin Williams | USA | 15.50 |
| M40 110 Meters Hurdles | 2nd place, silver medalist(s) | Nicolas Frylinck | RSA | 16.19 |
| M40 110 Meters Hurdles | 3rd place, bronze medalist(s) | Robert Zahn | USA | 16.22 |
| M40 400 Meters Hurdles | 1st place, gold medalist(s) | Mike Pannell | USA | 56.77 |
| M40 400 Meters Hurdles | 2nd place, silver medalist(s) | Albert Meier | SUI | 56.92 |
| M40 400 Meters Hurdles | 3rd place, bronze medalist(s) | Alexander Poselenov | RUS | 57.19 |
| M40 3000 Meters Steeplechase | 1st place, gold medalist(s) | John Greig Underwood | USA | 9:44.98 |
| M40 3000 Meters Steeplechase | 2nd place, silver medalist(s) | Patrick Allard | FRA | 9:49.56 |
| M40 3000 Meters Steeplechase | 3rd place, bronze medalist(s) | Michel Claire | FRA | 9:52.93 |
| M40 4 x 100 Meters Relay | 1st place, gold medalist(s) | Walwyn Franklin | GBR | 43.01 |
| M40 4 x 100 Meters Relay | 1st place, gold medalist(s) | Joseph Caines | GBR | 43.01 |
| M40 4 x 100 Meters Relay | 1st place, gold medalist(s) | Stephen Peters | GBR | 43.01 |
| M40 4 x 100 Meters Relay | 1st place, gold medalist(s) | Alasdair Ross | GBR | 43.01 |
| M40 4 x 100 Meters Relay | 2nd place, silver medalist(s) | Richard Thomas | USA | 43.74 |
| M40 4 x 100 Meters Relay | 2nd place, silver medalist(s) | Thomas A Jones | USA | 43.74 |
| M40 4 x 100 Meters Relay | 2nd place, silver medalist(s) | Robert Bowen | USA | 43.74 |
| M40 4 x 100 Meters Relay | 2nd place, silver medalist(s) | Jesse Thomas | USA | 43.74 |
| M40 4 x 100 Meters Relay | 3rd place, bronze medalist(s) | Jean Pierre Dassonvill | FRA | 44.68 |
| M40 4 x 100 Meters Relay | 3rd place, bronze medalist(s) | Pierre Simon | FRA | 44.68 |
| M40 4 x 100 Meters Relay | 3rd place, bronze medalist(s) | Guy Marguin | FRA | 44.68 |
| M40 4 x 100 Meters Relay | 3rd place, bronze medalist(s) | Andre Drutinus | FRA | 44.68 |
| M40 4 x 400 Meters Relay | 1st place, gold medalist(s) | Jon Ireland | GBR | 3:25.81 |
| M40 4 x 400 Meters Relay | 1st place, gold medalist(s) | Alasdair Ross | GBR | 3:25.81 |
| M40 4 x 400 Meters Relay | 1st place, gold medalist(s) | Stephen Peters | GBR | 3:25.81 |
| M40 4 x 400 Meters Relay | 1st place, gold medalist(s) | Joseph Caines | GBR | 3:25.81 |
| | 2nd place, silver medalist(s) | Rick Easley | USA | 3:26.03 |
| | 2nd place, silver medalist(s) | Michael Radiff | USA | 3:26.03 |
| | 2nd place, silver medalist(s) | Ralph Penn | USA | 3:26.03 |
| | 2nd place, silver medalist(s) | Jesse Thomas | USA | 3:26.03 |
| | 3rd place, bronze medalist(s) | Jean Pierre Dassonvill | FRA | 3:31.80 |
| | 3rd place, bronze medalist(s) | Jean Claude Andre | FRA | 3:31.80 |
| | 3rd place, bronze medalist(s) | Guy Marguin | FRA | 3:31.80 |
| | 3rd place, bronze medalist(s) | Andre Drutinus | FRA | 3:31.80 |
| M40 High Jump | 1st place, gold medalist(s) | Jim Barrineau | USA | 2.11 WR |
| M40 High Jump | 2nd place, silver medalist(s) | Dwight Stones | USA | 2.08 WR |
| M40 High Jump | 3rd place, bronze medalist(s) | Reinhard Heidemann | GER | 1.90 |
| M40 Pole Vault | 1st place, gold medalist(s) | Larry Jessee | USA | 4.60 |
| M40 Pole Vault | 2nd place, silver medalist(s) | Erno Mako | HUN | 4.60 |
| M40 Pole Vault | 3rd place, bronze medalist(s) | Mike Hogan | USA | 4.45 |
| M40 Long Jump | 1st place, gold medalist(s) | Richard Thomas | USA | 6.91 |
| M40 Long Jump | 2nd place, silver medalist(s) | Jaroslav Calda | TCH | 6.81 |
| M40 Long Jump | 3rd place, bronze medalist(s) | Keith Witherspoon | USA | 6.77 |
| M40 Triple Jump | 1st place, gold medalist(s) | Wolfram Walter | GER | 14.54 |
| M40 Triple Jump | 2nd place, silver medalist(s) | Keith Witherspoon | USA | 14.30 |
| M40 Triple Jump | 3rd place, bronze medalist(s) | Heinz-Arno Küppers | GER | 14.07 |
| M40 Shot Put | 1st place, gold medalist(s) | Claus-Dieker Fohrenbach | GER | 17.17 |
| M40 Shot Put | 2nd place, silver medalist(s) | Vassilios Maganas | GRE | 16.26 |
| M40 Shot Put | 3rd place, bronze medalist(s) | Uno Ojano | EST | 15.02 |
| M40 Discus Throw | 1st place, gold medalist(s) | Kazimierz Jankowski | POL | 47.78 |
| M40 Discus Throw | 2nd place, silver medalist(s) | Roger Kamla | USA | 46.50 |
| M40 Discus Throw | 3rd place, bronze medalist(s) | Dennis Umshler | USA | 45.62 |
| M40 Hammer throw | 1st place, gold medalist(s) | Vassilios Maganas | GRE | 60.06 |
| M40 Hammer throw | 2nd place, silver medalist(s) | Peter Farmer | USA | 57.22 |
| M40 Hammer throw | 3rd place, bronze medalist(s) | Dominique Bonal | FRA | 52.78 |
| M40 Javelin Throw | 1st place, gold medalist(s) | Michael Brown | USA | 61.00 |
| M40 Javelin Throw | 2nd place, silver medalist(s) | Stanislaw Zabinski | POL | 60.32 |
| M40 Javelin Throw | 3rd place, bronze medalist(s) | James Kirby | USA | 60.18 |
| M40 Decathlon | 1st place, gold medalist(s) | Stan Vegar | USA | 7473 |
| M40 Decathlon | 2nd place, silver medalist(s) | Roland Hepperle | GER | 6870 |
| M40 Decathlon | 3rd place, bronze medalist(s) | Klaus-Peter Neuendorf | GER | 6728 |
| M40 Weight Pentathlon | 1st place, gold medalist(s) | Vassilios Maganas | GRE | 3914 |
| M40 Weight Pentathlon | 2nd place, silver medalist(s) | Gary England | USA | 3833 |
| M40 Weight Pentathlon | 3rd place, bronze medalist(s) | Kazimierz Jankowski | POL | 3247 |
| M40 10K Cross Country | 1st place, gold medalist(s) | Grenville Wood | AUS | 33:25 |
| M40 10K Cross Country | 2nd place, silver medalist(s) | Joaquim Pereira | POR | 33:37 |
| M40 10K Cross Country | 3rd place, bronze medalist(s) | Francisc Gravito Ribeiro | POR | 33:46 |
| M40 10K Cross Country team | 1st place, gold medalist(s) | Joaquim Pereira | POR | 33:37 |
| M40 10K Cross Country team | 1st place, gold medalist(s) | Francisc Gravito Ribeiro | POR | 33:46 |
| M40 10K Cross Country team | 1st place, gold medalist(s) | Luis Fil Lopes Silva Pires | POR | 33:49 |
| M40 10K Cross Country team | 1st place, gold medalist(s) | team | POR | 1:41:32 |
| M40 10K Cross Country team | 2nd place, silver medalist(s) | Jonathan Kermiet | USA | 34:57 |
| M40 10K Cross Country team | 2nd place, silver medalist(s) | Robert Chasen | USA | 35:22 |
| M40 10K Cross Country team | 2nd place, silver medalist(s) | Sadot Mendez | USA | 35:31 |
| M40 10K Cross Country team | 2nd place, silver medalist(s) | team | USA | 1:45:50 |
| M40 10K Cross Country team | 3rd place, bronze medalist(s) | Ray Curran | GBR | 34:22 |
| M40 10K Cross Country team | 3rd place, bronze medalist(s) | Stuart Nice | GBR | 36:25 |
| M40 10K Cross Country team | 3rd place, bronze medalist(s) | William Doherty | GBR | 38:07 |
| M40 10K Cross Country team | 3rd place, bronze medalist(s) | team | GBR | 1:48:55 |
| M40 20K Race Walk | 1st place, gold medalist(s) | Christos Karagiorgos | GRE | 1:36:42 |
| M40 20K Race Walk | 2nd place, silver medalist(s) | Warrick Yeager | USA | 1:38:19 |
| M40 20K Race Walk | 3rd place, bronze medalist(s) | Claudio Penolazzi | ITA | 1:39:36 |
| M40 20K Race Walk team | 1st place, gold medalist(s) | Warrick Yeager | USA | 1:38:19 |
| M40 20K Race Walk team | 1st place, gold medalist(s) | Mike De Witt | USA | 1:46:14 |
| M40 20K Race Walk team | 1st place, gold medalist(s) | Curt Sheller | USA | 1:52:13 |
| M40 20K Race Walk team | 1st place, gold medalist(s) | team | USA | 5:16:56 |
| M40 20K Race Walk team | 2nd place, silver medalist(s) | Claudio Penolazzi | ITA | 1:39:36 |
| M40 20K Race Walk team | 2nd place, silver medalist(s) | Pizrangelo Fortunati | ITA | 1:47:00 |
| M40 20K Race Walk team | 2nd place, silver medalist(s) | Piergiorgio Andreotti | ITA | 1:52:17 |
| M40 20K Race Walk team | 2nd place, silver medalist(s) | team | ITA | 5:18:53 |
| M40 20K Race Walk team | 3rd place, bronze medalist(s) | Rene Corpataux | SUI | 1:54:03 |
| M40 20K Race Walk team | 3rd place, bronze medalist(s) | Daniel Brot | SUI | 1:58:02 |
| M40 20K Race Walk team | 3rd place, bronze medalist(s) | Michel Jomini | SUI | 2:01:14 |
| M40 20K Race Walk team | 3rd place, bronze medalist(s) | team | SUI | 5:53:19 |
| M40 Marathon | 1st place, gold medalist(s) | Eduardo A Castellano | VEN | 2:30:29 |
| M40 Marathon | 2nd place, silver medalist(s) | Americo De Jesus Ferreira | POR | 2:30:39 |
| M40 Marathon | 3rd place, bronze medalist(s) | Gerard Hendriks | NED | 2:30:50 |
| M40 Marathon team | 1st place, gold medalist(s) | Americo De Jesus Ferreira | POR | 2:30:39 |
| M40 Marathon team | 1st place, gold medalist(s) | Luis Fil Lopes Silva Pires | POR | 2:34:54 |
| M40 Marathon team | 1st place, gold medalist(s) | Antonio Ferro | POR | 2:35:49 |
| M40 Marathon team | 1st place, gold medalist(s) | team | POR | 7:41:22 |
| M40 Marathon team | 2nd place, silver medalist(s) | Terry Stanley | USA | 2:34:22 |
| M40 Marathon team | 2nd place, silver medalist(s) | Joseph Schieffer | USA | 2:38:59 |
| M40 Marathon team | 2nd place, silver medalist(s) | Sadot Mendez | USA | 2:39:45 |
| M40 Marathon team | 2nd place, silver medalist(s) | team | USA | 7:53:06 |
| M40 Marathon team | 3rd place, bronze medalist(s) | Alex Tcherednitchenk | RUS | 2:35:40 |
| M40 Marathon team | 3rd place, bronze medalist(s) | Alexander Tsukanov | RUS | 2:36:59 |
| M40 Marathon team | 3rd place, bronze medalist(s) | Viacheslav Imeninnik | RUS | 2:51:13 |
| M40 Marathon team | 3rd place, bronze medalist(s) | team | RUS | 8:03:52 |

==== M45 ====
| Event | Pos | Athlete | Country | Results |
|---|---|---|---|---|
| M45 100 Meters | 1st place, gold medalist(s) | Marion McCoy | USA | 11.70 |
| M45 100 Meters | 2nd place, silver medalist(s) | Stan Whitley | USA | 11.75 |
| M45 100 Meters | 3rd place, bronze medalist(s) | Robert Mitchell | USA | 11.90 |
| M45 200 Meters | 1st place, gold medalist(s) | Robert Mitchell | USA | 24.08 |
| M45 200 Meters | 2nd place, silver medalist(s) | Stan Whitley | USA | 24.27 |
| M45 200 Meters | 3rd place, bronze medalist(s) | Laurence Malcolmson | NZL | 24.38 |
| M45 400 Meters | 1st place, gold medalist(s) | Fred Sowerby | USA | 50.72 WR |
| M45 400 Meters | 2nd place, silver medalist(s) | Peter Browne | GBR | 50.99 |
| M45 400 Meters | 3rd place, bronze medalist(s) | Eddy J Neyts | BEL | 51.68 |
| M45 800 Meters | 1st place, gold medalist(s) | Peter Browne | GBR | 2:00.08 |
| M45 800 Meters | 2nd place, silver medalist(s) | Nolan Shaheed | USA | 2:00.79 |
| M45 800 Meters | 3rd place, bronze medalist(s) | Norman Cornwell | USA | 2:01.61 |
| M45 1500 Meters | 1st place, gold medalist(s) | Rod Dixon | NZL | 4:01.21 |
| M45 1500 Meters | 2nd place, silver medalist(s) | Nolan Shaheed | USA | 4:01.67 |
| M45 1500 Meters | 3rd place, bronze medalist(s) | John Serrao | USA | 4:03.49 |
| M45 5000 Meters | 1st place, gold medalist(s) | Rod Dixon | NZL | 15:12.00 |
| M45 5000 Meters | 2nd place, silver medalist(s) | Antonio Matias Riscado | POR | 15:31.39 |
| M45 5000 Meters | 3rd place, bronze medalist(s) | Earl Owens | USA | 15:36.09 |
| M45 10000 Meters | 1st place, gold medalist(s) | Ingo Sensburg | GER | 32:14.63 |
| M45 10000 Meters | 2nd place, silver medalist(s) | Earl Owens | USA | 32:33.33 |
| M45 10000 Meters | 3rd place, bronze medalist(s) | Alexander Tsukanov | RUS | 32:53.24 |
| M45 5K Race Walk | 1st place, gold medalist(s) | Bohdan Bułakowski | POL | 23:01.81 |
| M45 5K Race Walk | 2nd place, silver medalist(s) | Robert Care | GBR | 23:16.76 |
| M45 5K Race Walk | 3rd place, bronze medalist(s) | Robert Keating | USA | 23:33.31 |
| M45 110 Meters Hurdles | 1st place, gold medalist(s) | Stan Druckrey | USA | 15.94 |
| M45 110 Meters Hurdles | 2nd place, silver medalist(s) | Tony Wells | GBR | 16.07 |
| M45 110 Meters Hurdles | 3rd place, bronze medalist(s) | Jack Craig | USA | 16.08 |
| M45 400 Meters Hurdles | 1st place, gold medalist(s) | Stan Druckrey | USA | 56.80 |
| M45 400 Meters Hurdles | 2nd place, silver medalist(s) | Rodney Wiltshire | USA | 58.97 |
| M45 400 Meters Hurdles | 3rd place, bronze medalist(s) | Tony Wells | GBR | 58.98 |
| M45 3000 Meters Steeplechase | 1st place, gold medalist(s) | Steef Kyne | NED | 9:58.46 |
| M45 3000 Meters Steeplechase | 2nd place, silver medalist(s) | Valery Aristov | RUS | 10:05.64 |
| M45 3000 Meters Steeplechase | 3rd place, bronze medalist(s) | Harald Odegard | NOR | 10:33.42 |
| M45 4 x 100 Meters Relay | 1st place, gold medalist(s) | Jim Dolezel | USA | 45.45 |
| M45 4 x 100 Meters Relay | 1st place, gold medalist(s) | Kenneth Brinker | USA | 45.45 |
| M45 4 x 100 Meters Relay | 1st place, gold medalist(s) | Mac Azuogo | USA | 45.45 |
| M45 4 x 100 Meters Relay | 1st place, gold medalist(s) | Humbart Santillo | USA | 45.45 |
| M45 4 x 100 Meters Relay | 2nd place, silver medalist(s) | Tony Wells | GBR | 47.44 |
| M45 4 x 100 Meters Relay | 2nd place, silver medalist(s) | John Charlton | GBR | 47.44 |
| M45 4 x 100 Meters Relay | 2nd place, silver medalist(s) | David Woolley | GBR | 47.44 |
| M45 4 x 100 Meters Relay | 2nd place, silver medalist(s) | Tyrone Lewis | GBR | 47.44 |
| M45 4 x 100 Meters Relay | 3rd place, bronze medalist(s) | Gideon Breytenbach | RSA | 47.48 |
| M45 4 x 100 Meters Relay | 3rd place, bronze medalist(s) | Monty Hacker | RSA | 47.48 |
| M45 4 x 100 Meters Relay | 3rd place, bronze medalist(s) | Ockert Smit | RSA | 47.48 |
| M45 4 x 100 Meters Relay | 3rd place, bronze medalist(s) | David R Appollis | RSA | 47.48 |
| M45 4 x 400 Meters Relay | 1st place, gold medalist(s) | Philip Felton | USA | 3:36.47 |
| M45 4 x 400 Meters Relay | 1st place, gold medalist(s) | Jim Dolezel | USA | 3:36.47 |
| M45 4 x 400 Meters Relay | 1st place, gold medalist(s) | Kenneth Brinker | USA | 3:36.47 |
| M45 4 x 400 Meters Relay | 1st place, gold medalist(s) | Fred Sowerby | USA | 3:36.47 |
| M45 4 x 400 Meters Relay | 2nd place, silver medalist(s) | David Woolley | GBR | 3:38.18 |
| M45 4 x 400 Meters Relay | 2nd place, silver medalist(s) | Tony Wells | GBR | 3:38.18 |
| M45 4 x 400 Meters Relay | 2nd place, silver medalist(s) | Tyrone Lewis | GBR | 3:38.18 |
| M45 4 x 400 Meters Relay | 2nd place, silver medalist(s) | Peter Browne | GBR | 3:38.18 |
| M45 4 x 400 Meters Relay | 3rd place, bronze medalist(s) | Robert Zimmerman | CAN | 3:41.77 |
| M45 4 x 400 Meters Relay | 3rd place, bronze medalist(s) | Bill McIlwane | CAN | 3:41.77 |
| M45 4 x 400 Meters Relay | 3rd place, bronze medalist(s) | Steve Bogatek | CAN | 3:41.77 |
| M45 4 x 400 Meters Relay | 3rd place, bronze medalist(s) | Harold Isao Morioka | CAN | 3:41.77 |
| M45 High Jump | 1st place, gold medalist(s) | Charlie Rader | USA | 1.88 |
| M45 High Jump | 2nd place, silver medalist(s) | Dusan Prezelj | SLO | 1.88 |
| M45 High Jump | 3rd place, bronze medalist(s) | James Sauers | USA | 1.80 |
| M45 Pole Vault | 1st place, gold medalist(s) | Daniel Borrey | USA | 4.60 |
| M45 Pole Vault | 2nd place, silver medalist(s) | Jerry Cash | USA | 4.45 |
| M45 Pole Vault | 3rd place, bronze medalist(s) | Flemming Johansen | DEN | 4.30 |
| M45 Pole Vault | 3rd place, bronze medalist(s) | Greg Miguel | USA | 4.30 |
| M45 Long Jump | 1st place, gold medalist(s) | Anatoly Bebrov | RUS | 6.61 |
| M45 Long Jump | 2nd place, silver medalist(s) | Svatoslav Sauliak | RUS | 6.48 |
| M45 Long Jump | 3rd place, bronze medalist(s) | Pertti Ahomaki | FIN | 6.48 |
| M45 Triple Jump | 1st place, gold medalist(s) | Valodimir Chernyatevich | UKR | 14.11 |
| M45 Triple Jump | 2nd place, silver medalist(s) | Pertti Ahomaki | FIN | 13.28 |
| M45 Triple Jump | 3rd place, bronze medalist(s) | Bernard Lejeune | FRA | 13.25 |
| M45 Shot Put | 1st place, gold medalist(s) | Celso Angulo Aragon | COL | 15.15 |
| M45 Shot Put | 2nd place, silver medalist(s) | Vlavtimil Koca | TCH | 14.74 |
| M45 Shot Put | 3rd place, bronze medalist(s) | Francesco Carcioffo | ITA | 13.84 |
| M45 Discus Throw | 1st place, gold medalist(s) | Luciano Baraldo | ITA | 47.56 |
| M45 Discus Throw | 2nd place, silver medalist(s) | Ferenc Tégla | HUN | 46.30 |
| M45 Discus Throw | 3rd place, bronze medalist(s) | Bengt Nilsson | SWE | 45.62 |
| M45 Hammer throw | 1st place, gold medalist(s) | Boris Zaychuk | CAN | 57.80 |
| M45 Hammer throw | 2nd place, silver medalist(s) | Roger Schneider | SUI | 50.90 |
| M45 Hammer throw | 3rd place, bronze medalist(s) | Jan Roodt | RSA | 50.82 |
| M45 Javelin Throw | 1st place, gold medalist(s) | Joseph Greenberg | USA | 63.02 |
| M45 Javelin Throw | 2nd place, silver medalist(s) | Jürgen Brandt | GER | 59.66 |
| M45 Javelin Throw | 3rd place, bronze medalist(s) | Frantisek Drab | TCH | 57.68 |
| M45 Decathlon | 1st place, gold medalist(s) | Finar Johan Svendgard | NOR | 7289 |
| M45 Decathlon | 2nd place, silver medalist(s) | Brant Tolsma | USA | 6987 |
| M45 Decathlon | 3rd place, bronze medalist(s) | Tyrone Lewis | GBR | 6757 |
| M45 Weight Pentathlon | 1st place, gold medalist(s) | Jan Roodt | RSA | 3782 |
| M45 Weight Pentathlon | 2nd place, silver medalist(s) | Marten Regtop | NED | 3721 |
| M45 Weight Pentathlon | 3rd place, bronze medalist(s) | Vlavtimil Koca | TCH | 3651 |
| M45 10K Cross Country | 1st place, gold medalist(s) | Alexander Tsukanov | RUS | 33:58 |
| M45 10K Cross Country | 2nd place, silver medalist(s) | Antonio Matias Riscado | POR | 34:14 |
| M45 10K Cross Country | 3rd place, bronze medalist(s) | Alexey Gavrilov | RUS | 34:56 |
| M45 10K Cross Country team | 1st place, gold medalist(s) | Alexander Tsukanov | RUS | 33:58 |
| M45 10K Cross Country team | 1st place, gold medalist(s) | Alexey Gavrilov | RUS | 34:56 |
| M45 10K Cross Country team | 1st place, gold medalist(s) | Valery Aristov | RUS | 35:10 |
| M45 10K Cross Country team | 1st place, gold medalist(s) | team | RUS | 1:44:04 |
| M45 10K Cross Country team | 2nd place, silver medalist(s) | Denis A Noonan | IRE | 35:13 |
| M45 10K Cross Country team | 2nd place, silver medalist(s) | Brendan Sherlock | IRE | 35:21 |
| M45 10K Cross Country team | 2nd place, silver medalist(s) | John Sheridan | IRE | 35:26 |
| M45 10K Cross Country team | 2nd place, silver medalist(s) | team | IRE | 1:46:00 |
| M45 10K Cross Country team | 3rd place, bronze medalist(s) | Antonio Matias Riscado | POR | 34:14 |
| M45 10K Cross Country team | 3rd place, bronze medalist(s) | Ivo Silva | POR | 36:56 |
| M45 10K Cross Country team | 3rd place, bronze medalist(s) | Jose F Muchado | POR | 36:57 |
| M45 10K Cross Country team | 3rd place, bronze medalist(s) | team | POR | 1:48:07 |
| M45 20K Race Walk | 1st place, gold medalist(s) | Alexander Oleinik | RUS | 1:36:50 |
| M45 20K Race Walk | 2nd place, silver medalist(s) | Bohdan Bułakowski | POL | 1:40:22 |
| M45 20K Race Walk | 3rd place, bronze medalist(s) | Bernard Binggeli | SUI | 1:42:37 |
| M45 20K Race Walk team | 1st place, gold medalist(s) | Robert Keating | USA | 1:48:22 |
| M45 20K Race Walk team | 1st place, gold medalist(s) | Brian Savilonis | USA | 1:50:05 |
| M45 20K Race Walk team | 1st place, gold medalist(s) | Taka Amano | USA | 1:54:42 |
| M45 20K Race Walk team | 1st place, gold medalist(s) | team | USA | 5:33:09 |
| M45 20K Race Walk team | 2nd place, silver medalist(s) | Bernard Binggeli | SUI | 1:42:37 |
| M45 20K Race Walk team | 2nd place, silver medalist(s) | Roland Borgmann | SUI | 1:55:25 |
| M45 20K Race Walk team | 2nd place, silver medalist(s) | Michel Schneider | SUI | 1:56:05 |
| M45 20K Race Walk team | 2nd place, silver medalist(s) | team | SUI | 5:34:07 |
| M45 20K Race Walk team | 3rd place, bronze medalist(s) | Alexander Oleinik | RUS | 1:36:50 |
| M45 20K Race Walk team | 3rd place, bronze medalist(s) | Yury Sokolov | RUS | 2:10:23 |
| M45 20K Race Walk team | 3rd place, bronze medalist(s) | Yury Liutikov | RUS | 2:38:19 |
| M45 20K Race Walk team | 3rd place, bronze medalist(s) | team | RUS | 6:25:32 |
| M45 Marathon | 1st place, gold medalist(s) | Felix Hernando-Nieto | ESP | 2:31:00 |
| M45 Marathon | 2nd place, silver medalist(s) | Charles Thompson | USA | 2:36:37 |
| M45 Marathon | 3rd place, bronze medalist(s) | Alexander Tsukanov | RUS | 2:36:59 |
| M45 Marathon team | 1st place, gold medalist(s) | Charles Thompson | USA | 2:36:37 |
| M45 Marathon team | 1st place, gold medalist(s) | Robert Briglio | USA | 2:45:04 |
| M45 Marathon team | 1st place, gold medalist(s) | Ric Perry | USA | 2:46:55 |
| M45 Marathon team | 1st place, gold medalist(s) | team | USA | 8:08:36 |
| M45 Marathon team | 2nd place, silver medalist(s) | Rainer Lindemann | GER | 2:41:15 |
| M45 Marathon team | 2nd place, silver medalist(s) | Herbert Raabe | GER | 2:45:47 |
| M45 Marathon team | 2nd place, silver medalist(s) | Willi Maertens | GER | 2:46:11 |
| M45 Marathon team | 2nd place, silver medalist(s) | team | GER | 8:13:13 |
| M45 Marathon team | 3rd place, bronze medalist(s) | Armand Metenier | FRA | 2:54:17 |
| M45 Marathon team | 3rd place, bronze medalist(s) | Jean Bisson | FRA | 2:56:06 |
| M45 Marathon team | 3rd place, bronze medalist(s) | Jean Lemort | FRA | 2:56:08 |
| M45 Marathon team | 3rd place, bronze medalist(s) | team | FRA | 8:46:31 |

==== M50 ====
| Event | Pos | Athlete | Country | Results |
|---|---|---|---|---|
| M50 100 Meters | 1st place, gold medalist(s) | Stephen Robbins | USA | 11.24 WR |
| M50 100 Meters | 2nd place, silver medalist(s) | Peter Crombie | AUS | 11.47 |
| M50 100 Meters | 3rd place, bronze medalist(s) | Stanley J Wald | RSA | 11.55 |
| M50 200 Meters | 1st place, gold medalist(s) | Stephen Robbins | USA | 23.6? |
| M50 200 Meters | 2nd place, silver medalist(s) | Peter Crombie | AUS | 24.?? |
| M50 200 Meters | 3rd place, bronze medalist(s) | Roy Fearnall | AUS | 24.?? |
| M50 400 Meters | 1st place, gold medalist(s) | Stephen Robbins | USA | 51.63 WR |
| M50 400 Meters | 2nd place, silver medalist(s) | Peter Crombie | AUS | 52.03 |
| M50 400 Meters | 3rd place, bronze medalist(s) | Harold Isao Morioka | CAN | 52.16 |
| M50 800 Meters | 1st place, gold medalist(s) | Reginald Phipps | GBR | 2:03.62 |
| M50 800 Meters | 2nd place, silver medalist(s) | Kenneth Sparks | USA | 2:04.01 |
| M50 800 Meters | 3rd place, bronze medalist(s) | Harold MacDonald | AUS | 2:08.77 |
| M50 1500 Meters | 1st place, gold medalist(s) | Reginald Phipps | GBR | 4:12.60 |
| M50 1500 Meters | 2nd place, silver medalist(s) | Kenneth Sparks | USA | 4:12.87 |
| M50 1500 Meters | 3rd place, bronze medalist(s) | John Potts | GBR | 4:15.68 |
| M50 5000 Meters | 1st place, gold medalist(s) | Jose Bastos | BRA | 15:43.14 |
| M50 5000 Meters | 2nd place, silver medalist(s) | Jiri Kindl | TCH | 16:17.71 |
| M50 5000 Meters | 3rd place, bronze medalist(s) | Alan Galbraith | NZL | 16:20.28 |
| M50 10000 Meters | 1st place, gold medalist(s) | Ron Robertson | NZL | 32:39.67 |
| M50 10000 Meters | 2nd place, silver medalist(s) | Jose Bastos | BRA | 32:42.58 |
| M50 10000 Meters | 3rd place, bronze medalist(s) | Manuel Carvalho Da Silva | POR | 34:07.26 |
| M50 5K Race Walk | 1st place, gold medalist(s) | George White | AUS | 23:46.75 |
| M50 5K Race Walk | 2nd place, silver medalist(s) | James Carmines | USA | 24:01.07 |
| M50 5K Race Walk | 3rd place, bronze medalist(s) | Donald L Denoon | USA | 24:12.95 |
| M50 100 Meters Hurdles | 1st place, gold medalist(s) | Courtland Gray | USA | 14.97 |
| M50 100 Meters Hurdles | 2nd place, silver medalist(s) | Micholis Malatidis | GRE | 14.97 |
| M50 100 Meters Hurdles | 3rd place, bronze medalist(s) | Barry Ferguson | GBR | 16.07 |
| M50 400 Meters Hurdles | 1st place, gold medalist(s) | Courtland Gray | USA | 59.?? |
| M50 400 Meters Hurdles | 2nd place, silver medalist(s) | Alberto Oliveira | BRA | 1:00.?? |
| M50 400 Meters Hurdles | 3rd place, bronze medalist(s) | Klaus Wucherer | GER | 1:00.?? |
| M50 3000 Meters Steeplechase | 1st place, gold medalist(s) | Ron Robertson | NZL | 9:52.?? |
| M50 3000 Meters Steeplechase | 2nd place, silver medalist(s) | Victor Smith | GBR | 10:45.?? |
| M50 3000 Meters Steeplechase | 3rd place, bronze medalist(s) | John Walker | AUS | 10:47.?? |
| M50 4 x 100 Meters Relay | 1st place, gold medalist(s) | Melvin Fields | USA | 45.04 WR |
| M50 4 x 100 Meters Relay | 1st place, gold medalist(s) | Thaddeus Bell | USA | 45.04 WR |
| M50 4 x 100 Meters Relay | 1st place, gold medalist(s) | Edward Jones Jr | USA | 45.04 WR |
| M50 4 x 100 Meters Relay | 1st place, gold medalist(s) | Stephen Robbins | USA | 45.04 WR |
| M50 4 x 100 Meters Relay | 2nd place, silver medalist(s) | Ross Kent | AUS | 46.?? |
| M50 4 x 100 Meters Relay | 2nd place, silver medalist(s) | Roy Fearnall | AUS | 46.?? |
| M50 4 x 100 Meters Relay | 2nd place, silver medalist(s) | Fred Turner | AUS | 46.?? |
| M50 4 x 100 Meters Relay | 2nd place, silver medalist(s) | Peter Crombie | AUS | 46.?? |
| M50 4 x 100 Meters Relay | 3rd place, bronze medalist(s) | Peter Scholz | GER | 46.?? |
| M50 4 x 100 Meters Relay | 3rd place, bronze medalist(s) | Theodor Lenk | GER | 46.?? |
| M50 4 x 100 Meters Relay | 3rd place, bronze medalist(s) | Gerold Schmitt | GER | 46.?? |
| M50 4 x 100 Meters Relay | 3rd place, bronze medalist(s) | Norbert Meyer-Hartmann | GER | 46.?? |
| M50 4 x 400 Meters Relay | 1st place, gold medalist(s) | Lloyd Hart | USA | 3:37.27 |
| M50 4 x 400 Meters Relay | 1st place, gold medalist(s) | Roger Pierce | USA | 3:37.27 |
| M50 4 x 400 Meters Relay | 1st place, gold medalist(s) | Dennis Duffy | USA | 3:37.27 |
| M50 4 x 400 Meters Relay | 1st place, gold medalist(s) | Melvin Fields | USA | 3:37.27 |
| M50 4 x 400 Meters Relay | 2nd place, silver medalist(s) | Roy Fearnall | AUS | 3:37.86 |
| M50 4 x 400 Meters Relay | 2nd place, silver medalist(s) | Keith Martin | AUS | 3:37.86 |
| M50 4 x 400 Meters Relay | 2nd place, silver medalist(s) | Fred Turner | AUS | 3:37.86 |
| M50 4 x 400 Meters Relay | 2nd place, silver medalist(s) | Peter Crombie | AUS | 3:37.86 |
| M50 4 x 400 Meters Relay | 3rd place, bronze medalist(s) | Norbert Meyer-Hartmann | GER | 3:45.06 |
| M50 4 x 400 Meters Relay | 3rd place, bronze medalist(s) | Volker Peitzmeier | GER | 3:45.06 |
| M50 4 x 400 Meters Relay | 3rd place, bronze medalist(s) | Dieter Millbradt | GER | 3:45.06 |
| M50 4 x 400 Meters Relay | 3rd place, bronze medalist(s) | Peter Scholz | GER | 3:45.06 |
| M50 High Jump | 1st place, gold medalist(s) | Jaroslav Hanus | TCH | 1.78 |
| M50 High Jump | 2nd place, silver medalist(s) | Gunther Spielvogel | GER | 1.78 |
| M50 High Jump | 3rd place, bronze medalist(s) | Dieter Wille | GER | 1.74 |
| M50 Pole Vault | 1st place, gold medalist(s) | Robert Neutzling | USA | 4.00 |
| M50 Pole Vault | 2nd place, silver medalist(s) | Heinz Beat Wyss | SUI | 4.00 |
| M50 Pole Vault | 3rd place, bronze medalist(s) | Michael Morris | USA | 3.85 |
| M50 Long Jump | 1st place, gold medalist(s) | Tapani Taavitsainen | FIN | 6.59 WR |
| M50 Long Jump | 2nd place, silver medalist(s) | John Hartfield | USA | 6.24 |
| M50 Long Jump | 3rd place, bronze medalist(s) | Edward Jones Jr | USA | 5.95 |
| M50 Triple Jump | 1st place, gold medalist(s) | Jurgen Lamp | EST | 13.41 |
| M50 Triple Jump | 2nd place, silver medalist(s) | Claus Werner Kreft | GER | 13.08 |
| M50 Triple Jump | 3rd place, bronze medalist(s) | Leonel Carvalho | POR | 12.73 |
| M50 Shot Put | 1st place, gold medalist(s) | Wolfgang Hamel | GER | 16.01 |
| M50 Shot Put | 2nd place, silver medalist(s) | Thomas Gage | USA | 15.25 |
| M50 Shot Put | 3rd place, bronze medalist(s) | Robert Mead | USA | 14.87 |
| M50 Discus Throw | 1st place, gold medalist(s) | Art Swarts | USA | 59.10 |
| M50 Discus Throw | 2nd place, silver medalist(s) | Lloyd Higgins | USA | 55.80 |
| M50 Discus Throw | 3rd place, bronze medalist(s) | Larry Pratt | USA | 54.62 |
| M50 Hammer throw | 1st place, gold medalist(s) | Thomas Gage | USA | 61.08 |
| M50 Hammer throw | 2nd place, silver medalist(s) | Heimo Viertbauer | AUT | 56.28 |
| M50 Hammer throw | 3rd place, bronze medalist(s) | Srećko Štiglić | CRO | 55.98 |
| M50 Javelin Throw | 1st place, gold medalist(s) | Josef Kolar | TCH | 59.86 |
| M50 Javelin Throw | 2nd place, silver medalist(s) | Russell White | USA | 56.52 |
| M50 Javelin Throw | 3rd place, bronze medalist(s) | Salomon Robbins Williams | MEX | 54.48 |
| M50 Decathlon | 1st place, gold medalist(s) | Rolf Geese | GER | 7947 |
| M50 Decathlon | 2nd place, silver medalist(s) | Snowy Brooks | GBR | 7288 |
| M50 Decathlon | 3rd place, bronze medalist(s) | Wilhelm Kraatz | GER | 7138 |
| M50 Weight Pentathlon | 1st place, gold medalist(s) | Thomas Gage | USA | 4701 |
| M50 Weight Pentathlon | 2nd place, silver medalist(s) | Graeme Rose | AUS | 4356 |
| M50 Weight Pentathlon | 3rd place, bronze medalist(s) | Ryszard Krzesinski | POL | 4137 |
| M50 10K Cross Country | 1st place, gold medalist(s) | Ron Robertson | NZL | 35:00 |
| M50 10K Cross Country | 2nd place, silver medalist(s) | Devaldino De Souza | BRA | 36:41 |
| M50 10K Cross Country | 3rd place, bronze medalist(s) | Peter Lessing | GER | 37:10 |
| M50 10K Cross Country team | 1st place, gold medalist(s) | Peter Lessing | GER | 37:10 |
| M50 10K Cross Country team | 1st place, gold medalist(s) | Karl Horst Klee | GER | 38:52 |
| M50 10K Cross Country team | 1st place, gold medalist(s) | Elias Dobre | GER | 39:27 |
| M50 10K Cross Country team | 1st place, gold medalist(s) | team | GER | 1:55:29 |
| M50 10K Cross Country team | 2nd place, silver medalist(s) | Jeff Corkill | USA | 37:27 |
| M50 10K Cross Country team | 2nd place, silver medalist(s) | Wally Herrala | USA | 37:43 |
| M50 10K Cross Country team | 2nd place, silver medalist(s) | James Lombardi | USA | 41:03 |
| M50 10K Cross Country team | 2nd place, silver medalist(s) | team | USA | 1:56:13 |
| M50 10K Cross Country team | 3rd place, bronze medalist(s) | Devaldino De Souza | BRA | 36:41 |
| M50 10K Cross Country team | 3rd place, bronze medalist(s) | Renato Severo | BRA | 37:25 |
| M50 10K Cross Country team | 3rd place, bronze medalist(s) | Pedro Gomes De Oliveira | BRA | 44:20 |
| M50 10K Cross Country team | 3rd place, bronze medalist(s) | team | BRA | 1:58:26 |
| M50 20K Race Walk | 1st place, gold medalist(s) | George White | AUS | 1:44:28 |
| M50 20K Race Walk | 2nd place, silver medalist(s) | Edgar Kousky | USA | 1:51:33 |
| M50 20K Race Walk | 3rd place, bronze medalist(s) | Piergiorgio Andreotti | ITA | 1:52:17 |
| M50 20K Race Walk team | 1st place, gold medalist(s) | Edgar Kousky | USA | 1:51:33 |
| M50 20K Race Walk team | 1st place, gold medalist(s) | James Carmines | USA | 1:52:24 |
| M50 20K Race Walk team | 1st place, gold medalist(s) | Alan Yap | USA | 1:59:18 |
| M50 20K Race Walk team | 1st place, gold medalist(s) | team | USA | 5:43:15 |
| M50 20K Race Walk team | 2nd place, silver medalist(s) | Jean Moussine | FRA | 1:57:41 |
| M50 20K Race Walk team | 2nd place, silver medalist(s) | Constant Briere | FRA | 2:03:21 |
| M50 20K Race Walk team | 2nd place, silver medalist(s) | Marcel Oliet | FRA | 2:04:20 |
| M50 20K Race Walk team | 2nd place, silver medalist(s) | team | FRA | 6:05:22 |
| M50 20K Race Walk team | 3rd place, bronze medalist(s) | Rainer Heidemann | GER | 1:57:04 |
| M50 20K Race Walk team | 3rd place, bronze medalist(s) | Alfred Ludwig | GER | 2:03:50 |
| M50 20K Race Walk team | 3rd place, bronze medalist(s) | Heinz Jurgen Ullrich | GER | 2:09:03 |
| M50 20K Race Walk team | 3rd place, bronze medalist(s) | team | GER | 6:09:57 |
| M50 Marathon | 1st place, gold medalist(s) | Jose Bastos | BRA | 2:34:37 |
| M50 Marathon | 2nd place, silver medalist(s) | Juvenal Costa | POR | 2:43:37 |
| M50 Marathon | 3rd place, bronze medalist(s) | Herman Tadeo Cortinez | ARG | 2:43:44 |
| M50 Marathon team | 1st place, gold medalist(s) | Peter Lessing | GER | 2:44:45 |
| M50 Marathon team | 1st place, gold medalist(s) | Karl Horst Klee | GER | 2:57:03 |
| M50 Marathon team | 1st place, gold medalist(s) | Siegfried Vosshenrich | GER | 2:58:00 |
| M50 Marathon team | 1st place, gold medalist(s) | team | GER | 8:39:48 |
| M50 Marathon team | 2nd place, silver medalist(s) | Terry Van Natta | USA | 2:49:20 |
| M50 Marathon team | 2nd place, silver medalist(s) | Richard Webb | USA | 2:49:36 |
| M50 Marathon team | 2nd place, silver medalist(s) | Hector Rodriguez | USA | 3:12:20 |
| M50 Marathon team | 2nd place, silver medalist(s) | team | USA | 8:51:16 |
| M50 Marathon team | 3rd place, bronze medalist(s) | Michele Bassi | ITA | 2:46:33 |
| M50 Marathon team | 3rd place, bronze medalist(s) | Alfredo Stella | ITA | 3:07:59 |
| M50 Marathon team | 3rd place, bronze medalist(s) | Bruno Baggia | ITA | 3:10:01 |
| M50 Marathon team | 3rd place, bronze medalist(s) | team | ITA | 9:04:33 |

==== M55 ====
| Event | Pos | Athlete | Country | Results |
|---|---|---|---|---|
| M55 100 Meters Hurdles | 1st place, gold medalist(s) | Hugh Adams | USA | 15.21 WR |
| M55 400 Meters Hurdles | 1st place, gold medalist(s) | Guido Müller | GER | 58.92 WR |
| M55 Pole Vault | 1st place, gold medalist(s) | Hans Lagerqvist | SWE | 4.15 WR |
| M55 Long Jump | 1st place, gold medalist(s) | Stig Bäcklund | FIN | 6.35 WR |
| M55 Triple Jump | 1st place, gold medalist(s) | Stig Bäcklund | FIN | 13.69 WR |
| M55 Decathlon | 1st place, gold medalist(s) | Dale Lance | USA | 8179 WR |

==== M60 ====
| Event | Pos | Athlete | Country | Results |
|---|---|---|---|---|
| M60 400 Meters | 1st place, gold medalist(s) | Ralph Romain | TTO | 53.88 WR |
| M60 Shot Put | 1st place, gold medalist(s) | Peter Speckens | GER | 15.42 WR |
| M60 Decathlon | 1st place, gold medalist(s) | Phil Mulkey | USA | 8025 WR |

==== M65 ====
| Event | Pos | Athlete | Country | Results |
|---|---|---|---|---|
| M65 400 Meters | 1st place, gold medalist(s) | Earl Fee | CAN | 57.97 WR |
| M65 800 Meters | 1st place, gold medalist(s) | Earl Fee | CAN | 2:14.33 WR |
| M65 300 Meters Hurdles | 1st place, gold medalist(s) | Earl Fee | CAN | 45.71 WR |
| M65 5K Race Walk | 1st place, gold medalist(s) | Douglas Fotheringham | GBR | 27:41.83 WR |
| M65 Shot Put | 1st place, gold medalist(s) | Torsten Von Wachenfeldt | SWE | 14.71 WR |

==== M70 ====
| Event | Pos | Athlete | Country | Results |
|---|---|---|---|---|
| M70 5K Race Walk | 1st place, gold medalist(s) | Len Creo | GBR | 29:37.86 WR |

==== M75 ====
| Event | Pos | Athlete | Country | Results |
|---|---|---|---|---|
| M75 5K Race Walk | 1st place, gold medalist(s) | Reidar Jordell | NOR | 33:17.05 WR |

==== M80 ====
| Event | Pos | Athlete | Country | Results |
|---|---|---|---|---|
| M80 100 Meters | 1st place, gold medalist(s) | Giichi Suda | JPN | 16.0? |
| M80 100 Meters | 2nd place, silver medalist(s) | Giovanni Di Guardo | ITA | 16.4? |
| M80 100 Meters | 3rd place, bronze medalist(s) | Yoshio Okazaki | JPN | 16.5? |
| M80 200 Meters | 1st place, gold medalist(s) | Giichi Suda | JPN | 34.?? |
| M80 200 Meters | 2nd place, silver medalist(s) | Antonio Ant. De Fonseca | BRA | 34.?? |
| M80 200 Meters | 3rd place, bronze medalist(s) | Giovanni Di Guardo | ITA | 35.?? |
| M80 400 Meters | 1st place, gold medalist(s) | Antonio Ant. De Fonseca | BRA | 1:18.00 |
| M80 400 Meters | 2nd place, silver medalist(s) | Freidrich-E Mahlo | GER | 1:22.72 |
| M80 400 Meters | 3rd place, bronze medalist(s) | Giovanni Di Guardo | ITA | 1:24.41 |
| M80 800 Meters | 1st place, gold medalist(s) | Antonio Ant. De Fonseca | BRA | 3:16.21 |
| M80 800 Meters | 2nd place, silver medalist(s) | William Dyer | USA | 3:18.85 |
| M80 800 Meters | 3rd place, bronze medalist(s) | Giichi Suda | JPN | 3:46.64 |
| M80 1500 Meters | 1st place, gold medalist(s) | William Dyer | USA | 6:48.51 |
| M80 1500 Meters | 2nd place, silver medalist(s) | Panagiotis Gakis | GRE | 6:48.56 |
| M80 1500 Meters | 3rd place, bronze medalist(s) | Eugene Keller | USA | 7:15.05 |
| M80 5000 Meters | 1st place, gold medalist(s) | Panagiotis Gakis | GRE | 26:01.07 |
| M80 5000 Meters | 2nd place, silver medalist(s) | Tuplete Vasconcellos | BRA | 26:37.77 |
| M80 5000 Meters | 3rd place, bronze medalist(s) | Eugene Keller | USA | 27:22.55 |
| M80 10000 Meters | 1st place, gold medalist(s) | Tuplete Vasconcellos | BRA | 55:20.25 |
| M80 10000 Meters | 2nd place, silver medalist(s) | Frank Levine | USA | 56:48.77 |
| M80 10000 Meters | 3rd place, bronze medalist(s) | Eugene Keller | USA | 57:50.24 |
| M80 5K Race Walk | 1st place, gold medalist(s) | Bill Patterson | USA | 36:41.56 |
| M80 5K Race Walk | 2nd place, silver medalist(s) | Viljo Hallikainen | FIN | 36:59.49 |
| M80 5K Race Walk | 3rd place, bronze medalist(s) | Harry Drazin | USA | 37:37.47 |
| M80 80 Meters Hurdles | 1st place, gold medalist(s) | Frank Finger | USA | 18.42 |
| M80 80 Meters Hurdles | 2nd place, silver medalist(s) | Robert Boal | USA | 23.30 |
| M80 80 Meters Hurdles | 3rd place, bronze medalist(s) | Bert Morrow | USA | 25.07 |
| M80 300 Meters Hurdles | 1st place, gold medalist(s) | Freidrich-E Mahlo | GER | 1:14.38 |
| M80 300 Meters Hurdles | 2nd place, silver medalist(s) | Bert Morrow | USA | 1:23.01 |
| M80 300 Meters Hurdles | 3rd place, bronze medalist(s) | Robert Boal | USA | 1:24.55 |
| M80 2000 Meters Steeplechase | 1st place, gold medalist(s) | Eugene Keller | USA | 11:39.03 WR |
| M80 2000 Meters Steeplechase | 2nd place, silver medalist(s) | Giovanni Bonora | ITA | 12:27.00 |
| M80 4 x 100 Meters Relay | 1st place, gold medalist(s) | Mazumi Morita | JPN | 1:05.75 WR |
| M80 4 x 100 Meters Relay | 1st place, gold medalist(s) | Yoshio Okazaki | JPN | 1:05.75 WR |
| M80 4 x 100 Meters Relay | 1st place, gold medalist(s) | Yuichi Tateishi | JPN | 1:05.75 WR |
| M80 4 x 100 Meters Relay | 1st place, gold medalist(s) | Giichi Suda | JPN | 1:05.75 WR |
| M80 4 x 100 Meters Relay | 2nd place, silver medalist(s) | Robert Boal | USA | 1:15.58 |
| M80 4 x 100 Meters Relay | 2nd place, silver medalist(s) | Milo Lightfoot | USA | 1:15.58 |
| M80 4 x 100 Meters Relay | 2nd place, silver medalist(s) | Herman Mlotek | USA | 1:15.58 |
| M80 4 x 100 Meters Relay | 2nd place, silver medalist(s) | Bert Morrow | USA | 1:15.58 |
| M80 4 x 100 Meters Relay | 3rd place, bronze medalist(s) | Ahti Pajunen | FIN | 1:26.54 |
| M80 4 x 100 Meters Relay | 3rd place, bronze medalist(s) | Viljo Hallikainen | FIN | 1:26.54 |
| M80 4 x 100 Meters Relay | 3rd place, bronze medalist(s) | Tauno Raskinen | FIN | 1:26.54 |
| M80 4 x 100 Meters Relay | 3rd place, bronze medalist(s) | Tatu Pohja | FIN | 1:26.54 |
| M80 4 x 400 Meters Relay | 1st place, gold medalist(s) | Fumitaka Yamada | JPN | 6:54.86 WR |
| M80 4 x 400 Meters Relay | 1st place, gold medalist(s) | Yoshio Okazaki | JPN | 6:54.86 WR |
| M80 4 x 400 Meters Relay | 1st place, gold medalist(s) | Yuichi Tateishi | JPN | 6:54.86 WR |
| M80 4 x 400 Meters Relay | 1st place, gold medalist(s) | Giichi Suda | JPN | 6:54.86 WR |
| M80 4 x 400 Meters Relay | 2nd place, silver medalist(s) | Tauno Raskinen | FIN | 7:02.42 |
| M80 4 x 400 Meters Relay | 2nd place, silver medalist(s) | Erkki Haapalainen | FIN | 7:02.42 |
| M80 4 x 400 Meters Relay | 2nd place, silver medalist(s) | Viljo Hallikainen | FIN | 7:02.42 |
| M80 4 x 400 Meters Relay | 2nd place, silver medalist(s) | Ahti Pajunen | FIN | 7:02.42 |
| M80 4 x 400 Meters Relay | 3rd place, bronze medalist(s) | Charles Espy | USA | 7:59.03 |
| M80 4 x 400 Meters Relay | 3rd place, bronze medalist(s) | Robert Boal | USA | 7:59.03 |
| M80 4 x 400 Meters Relay | 3rd place, bronze medalist(s) | Chen-Ling Wang | USA | 7:59.03 |
| M80 4 x 400 Meters Relay | 3rd place, bronze medalist(s) | Milo Lightfoot | USA | 7:59.03 |
| M80 High Jump | 1st place, gold medalist(s) | Mazumi Morita | JPN | 1.14 |
| M80 High Jump | 2nd place, silver medalist(s) | Charles Roloff | USA | 1.06 |
| M80 High Jump | 2nd place, silver medalist(s) | Milo Lightfoot | USA | 1.06 |
| M80 Pole Vault | 1st place, gold medalist(s) | Carol Johnston | USA | 2.30 |
| M80 Pole Vault | 2nd place, silver medalist(s) | Kizo Kimura | JPN | 1.70 |
| M80 Pole Vault | 3rd place, bronze medalist(s) | Robert Boal | USA | 1.50 |
| M80 Long Jump | 1st place, gold medalist(s) | Mazumi Morita | JPN | 4.06 |
| M80 Long Jump | 2nd place, silver medalist(s) | Giichi Suda | JPN | 3.63 |
| M80 Long Jump | 3rd place, bronze medalist(s) | Yoshio Okazaki | JPN | 3.41 |
| M80 Triple Jump | 1st place, gold medalist(s) | Mazumi Morita | JPN | 8.69 |
| M80 Triple Jump | 2nd place, silver medalist(s) | Yuichi Tateishi | JPN | 7.63 |
| M80 Triple Jump | 3rd place, bronze medalist(s) | Giichi Suda | JPN | 7.58 |
| M80 Shot Put | 1st place, gold medalist(s) | Ross Carter | USA | 11.49 WR |
| M80 Shot Put | 2nd place, silver medalist(s) | Gerhard Schepe | GER | 10.73 |
| M80 Shot Put | 3rd place, bronze medalist(s) | Emil Schottle | GER | 9.27 |
| M80 Discus Throw | 1st place, gold medalist(s) | Ross Carter | USA | 35.44 |
| M80 Discus Throw | 2nd place, silver medalist(s) | Mario Riboni | ITA | 31.04 |
| M80 Discus Throw | 3rd place, bronze medalist(s) | Kurt Claass | GER | 29.30 |
| M80 Hammer throw | 1st place, gold medalist(s) | Artur Fleischhauer | GER | 29.76 |
| M80 Hammer throw | 2nd place, silver medalist(s) | Emil Schottle | GER | 29.74 |
| M80 Hammer throw | 3rd place, bronze medalist(s) | Berno Wischmann | GER | 28.18 |
| M80 Javelin Throw | 1st place, gold medalist(s) | Gerhard Schepe | GER | 32.56 WR |
| M80 Javelin Throw | 2nd place, silver medalist(s) | Charles Roloff | USA | 23.56 |
| M80 Javelin Throw | 3rd place, bronze medalist(s) | Yoshio Okazaki | JPN | 23.44 |
| M80 Decathlon | 1st place, gold medalist(s) | Kizo Kimura | JPN | 5499 |
| M80 Decathlon | 2nd place, silver medalist(s) | Giichi Suda | JPN | 5412 |
| M80 Decathlon | 3rd place, bronze medalist(s) | Kichisuke Ishikawa | JPN | 4916 |
| M80 Weight Pentathlon | 1st place, gold medalist(s) | Emil Schottle | GER | 3744 |
| M80 Weight Pentathlon | 2nd place, silver medalist(s) | Artur Fleischhauer | GER | 3431 |
| M80 Weight Pentathlon | 3rd place, bronze medalist(s) | Gerhard Schepe | GER | 3301 |
| M80 10K Cross Country | 1st place, gold medalist(s) | Tuplete Vasconcellos | BRA | 58:53 |
| M80 10K Cross Country | 2nd place, silver medalist(s) | Giovanni Bonora | ITA | 1:02:25 |
| M80 10K Cross Country | 3rd place, bronze medalist(s) | Eugene Keller | USA | 1:02:44 |
| M80 10K Cross Country team | 1st place, gold medalist(s) | Hugo Hoppen | GER | 1:22:29 |
| M80 10K Cross Country team | 1st place, gold medalist(s) | Gerhard Theune | GER | 1:22:29 |
| M80 10K Cross Country team | 1st place, gold medalist(s) | Johannes Luther | GER | 1:34:22 |
| M80 10K Cross Country team | 1st place, gold medalist(s) | team | GER | 4:19:20 |
| M80 20K Race Walk | 1st place, gold medalist(s) | Viljo Hallikainen | FIN | 2:40:16 |
| M80 20K Race Walk | 2nd place, silver medalist(s) | Bill Patterson | USA | 2:51:16 |
| M80 20K Race Walk | 3rd place, bronze medalist(s) | Mario Brivio | ITA | 2:55:15 |
| M80 20K Race Walk team | 1st place, gold medalist(s) | Gerhard Theune | GER | 3:11:56 |
| M80 20K Race Walk team | 1st place, gold medalist(s) | Johannes Luther | GER | 3:14:13 |
| M80 20K Race Walk team | 1st place, gold medalist(s) | Heinrich Busch | GER | 3:14:14 |
| M80 20K Race Walk team | 1st place, gold medalist(s) | team | GER | 9:40:23 |
| M80 Marathon | 1st place, gold medalist(s) | Tuplete Vasconcellos | BRA | 4:38:43 |
| M80 Marathon | 2nd place, silver medalist(s) | Dudley Healy | USA | 5:01:38 |

==== M85 ====
| Event | Pos | Athlete | Country | Results |
|---|---|---|---|---|
| M85 100 Meters | 1st place, gold medalist(s) | Kozo Haraguchi | JPN | 17.95 |
| M85 100 Meters | 2nd place, silver medalist(s) | Ahti Pajunen | FIN | 18.39 |
| M85 100 Meters | 3rd place, bronze medalist(s) | Russell Randall | USA | 18.41 |
| M85 200 Meters | 1st place, gold medalist(s) | Ahti Pajunen | FIN | 39.42 |
| M85 200 Meters | 2nd place, silver medalist(s) | Russell Randall | USA | 40.90 |
| M85 200 Meters | 3rd place, bronze medalist(s) | Jehanbax Kepadia | IND | 54.30 |
| M85 400 Meters | 1st place, gold medalist(s) | Russell Randall | USA | 1:38.34 |
| M85 400 Meters | 2nd place, silver medalist(s) | Erkki Haapalainen | FIN | 1:42.35 |
| M85 400 Meters | 3rd place, bronze medalist(s) | Jehanbax Kepadia | IND | 1:54.16 |
| M85 800 Meters | 1st place, gold medalist(s) | Erkki Haapalainen | FIN | 4:36.30 |
| M85 800 Meters | 2nd place, silver medalist(s) | Charles Espy | USA | 5:45.50 |
| M85 1500 Meters | 1st place, gold medalist(s) | Alipio Santos | POR | 9:13.52 |
| M85 1500 Meters | 2nd place, silver medalist(s) | Charles Espy | USA | 14:47.59 |
| M85 5000 Meters | 1st place, gold medalist(s) | Alipio Santos | POR | 34:28.95 |
| M85 5000 Meters | 2nd place, silver medalist(s) | Charles Espy | USA | 55:33.44 |
| M85 10000 Meters | 1st place, gold medalist(s) | Alipio Santos | POR | 1:13:01.90 |
| M85 10000 Meters | 2nd place, silver medalist(s) | Charles Espy | USA | 2:00:15.20 |
| M85 5K Race Walk | 1st place, gold medalist(s) | John Hanna | USA | 38:38.77 |
| M85 5K Race Walk | 2nd place, silver medalist(s) | Kurt Strauss | USA | 38:40.51 |
| M85 5K Race Walk | 3rd place, bronze medalist(s) | Sam Gadless | USA | 38:45.58 |
| M85 High Jump | 1st place, gold medalist(s) | Karl Trei | CAN | 0.98 |
| M85 Pole Vault | 1st place, gold medalist(s) | Ahti Pajunen | FIN | 1.90 WR |
| M85 Long Jump | 1st place, gold medalist(s) | Kameo Jin | JPN | 3.04 |
| M85 Long Jump | 2nd place, silver medalist(s) | Ahti Pajunen | FIN | 3.04 |
| M85 Long Jump | 3rd place, bronze medalist(s) | Sant Singh | IND | 2.85 |
| M85 Triple Jump | 1st place, gold medalist(s) | Karl Trei | CAN | 6.71 |
| M85 Triple Jump | 2nd place, silver medalist(s) | Ahti Pajunen | FIN | 6.57 |
| M85 Triple Jump | 3rd place, bronze medalist(s) | Sant Singh | IND | 6.03 |
| M85 Shot Put | 1st place, gold medalist(s) | Paavo Parinen | FIN | 7.80 |
| M85 Shot Put | 2nd place, silver medalist(s) | Robert Sattler | GER | 7.49 |
| M85 Shot Put | 3rd place, bronze medalist(s) | Ernst Schmidt | GER | 6.79 |
| M85 Discus Throw | 1st place, gold medalist(s) | Paavo Patinen | FIN | 22.44 |
| M85 Discus Throw | 2nd place, silver medalist(s) | Alfred Proksch | AUT | 22.38 |
| M85 Discus Throw | 3rd place, bronze medalist(s) | Robert Sattler | GER | 19.68 |
| M85 Hammer throw | 1st place, gold medalist(s) | Paavo Patinen | FIN | 20.42 |
| M85 Hammer throw | 2nd place, silver medalist(s) | Ernst Schmidt | GER | 15.26 |
| M85 Javelin Throw | 1st place, gold medalist(s) | Karl Trei | CAN | 20.78 |
| M85 Javelin Throw | 2nd place, silver medalist(s) | Robert Sattler | GER | 20.38 |
| M85 Javelin Throw | 3rd place, bronze medalist(s) | Kameo Jin | JPN | 16.12 |
| M85 Decathlon | 1st place, gold medalist(s) | Erkki Haapalainen | FIN | 3493 |
| M85 Weight Pentathlon | 1st place, gold medalist(s) | Paavo Patinen | FIN | 3079 |
| M85 10K Cross Country | 1st place, gold medalist(s) | Charles Espy | USA | 2:03.10 |
| M85 Marathon | 1st place, gold medalist(s) | Sam Gadless | USA | 6:23.18 |

==== M90 ====
| Event | Pos | Athlete | Country | Results |
|---|---|---|---|---|
| M90 100 Meters | 1st place, gold medalist(s) | Asdrubal Capo | URU | 23.43 |
| M90 100 Meters | 2nd place, silver medalist(s) | Federico Briones | ARG | 25.28 |
| M90 100 Meters | 3rd place, bronze medalist(s) | Konrad Boas | USA | 30.32 |
| M90 200 Meters | 1st place, gold medalist(s) | Asdrubal Capo | URU | 52.69 WR |
| M90 200 Meters | 2nd place, silver medalist(s) | Federico Briones | ARG | 53.46 |
| M90 200 Meters | 3rd place, bronze medalist(s) | Waldo McBurney | USA | 1:00.70 |
| M90 400 Meters | 1st place, gold medalist(s) | Asdrubal Capo | URU | 2:24.13 |
| M90 800 Meters | 1st place, gold medalist(s) | Waldo McBurney | USA | 5:50.27 |
| M90 5000 Meters | 1st place, gold medalist(s) | Alfred Althaus | GER | 43:48.03 |
| M90 10000 Meters | 1st place, gold medalist(s) | Alfred Althaus | GER | 1:25:33.80 |
| M90 10000 Meters | 2nd place, silver medalist(s) | Kazuo Morikawa | JPN | 1:46:52.10 |
| M90 5K Race Walk | 1st place, gold medalist(s) | Kazuo Morikawa | JPN | 49:42.70 |
| M90 High Jump | 1st place, gold medalist(s) | Waldo McBurney | USA | 0.98 |
| M90 Long Jump | 1st place, gold medalist(s) | Everett W Hosack | USA | 2.18 |
| M90 Triple Jump | 1st place, gold medalist(s) | Waldo McBurney | USA | 4.04 |
| M90 Shot Put | 1st place, gold medalist(s) | Lamberto Cicconi | ITA | 6.94 |
| M90 Shot Put | 2nd place, silver medalist(s) | Waldo McBurney | USA | 6.70 |
| M90 Discus Throw | 1st place, gold medalist(s) | Lamberto Cicconi | ITA | 22.06 WR |
| M90 Discus Throw | 2nd place, silver medalist(s) | Konrad Boas | USA | 9.84 |
| M90 Javelin Throw | 1st place, gold medalist(s) | Asdrubal Capo | URU | 8.90 |
| M90 Weight Pentathlon | 1st place, gold medalist(s) | Everett W Hosack | USA | 2225 |
