= Masters W50 high jump world record progression =

This is the progression of world record improvements of the high jump W50 division of Masters athletics.

Key

Incomplete information Pending

Height	Athlete	Nationality	Birthdate	Location	Date
1.60	Debbie Brill	Canada	10.03.1953	Langley	19.06.2004
1.57	Weia Reinboud	Netherlands	11.03.1950	Krommenie	06.08.2000
1.56	Weia Reinboud	Netherlands	11.03.1950	Eindhoven	29.07.2000
1.55	Weia Reinboud	Netherlands	11.03.1950	Haarlem	14.05.2000
1.55	Phil Raschker	United States	21.02.1947	Tucson	25.05.1997
1.53	Renate Vogen	Germany	26.11.1943	Buffalo	18.07.1995
1.47	Dorothy Tyler	United Kingdom	14.03.1920	Carshalton	14.06.1970
