= Oxley Barn =

- U.S. National Register of Historic Places
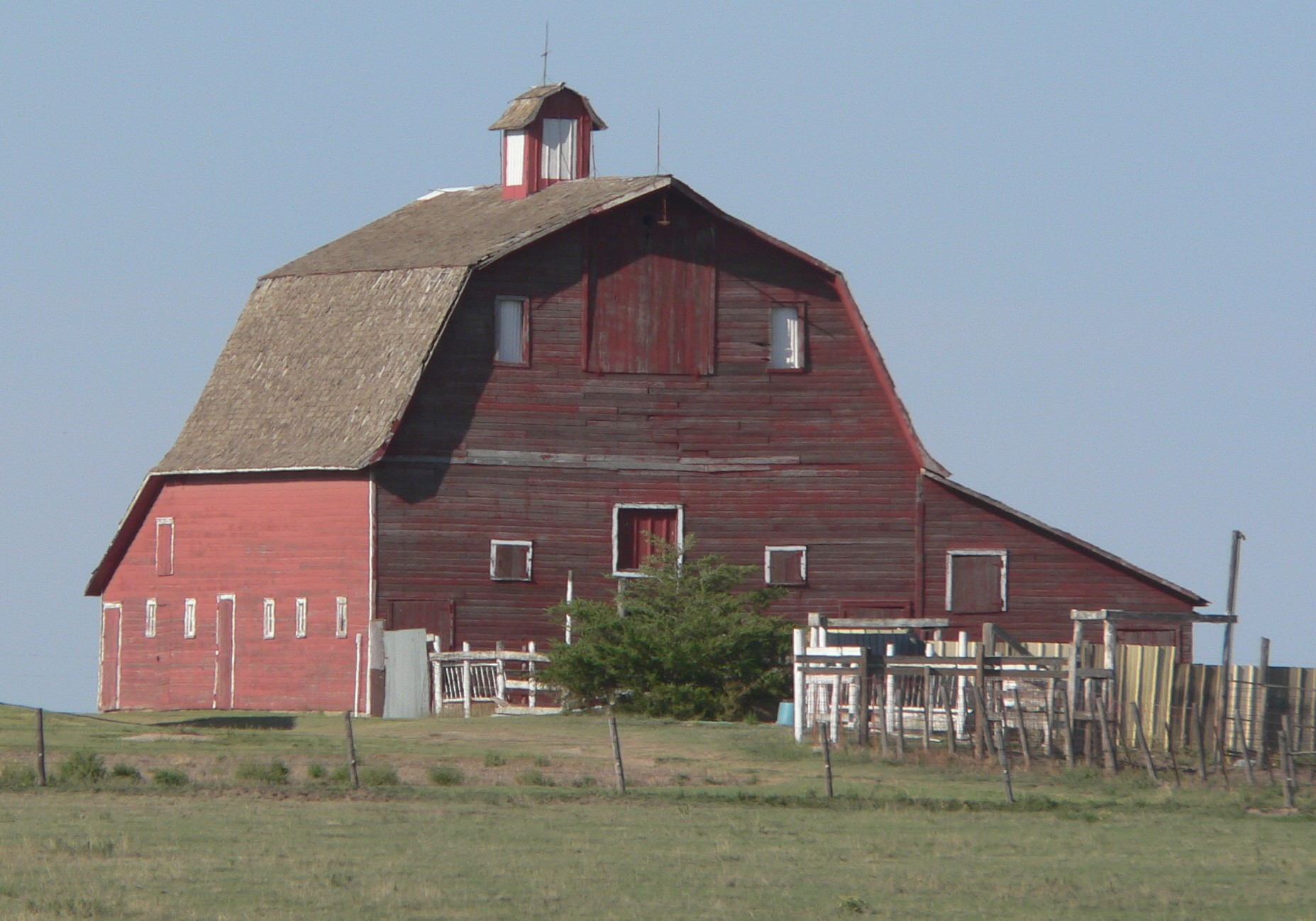

- Location within Kansas
- Location: 2740 County Road 74, Gove County, Kansas, near Quinter, Kansas
- Coordinates: 39.08042°N 100.22163°W
- Area: less than one acre
- Built: 1911
- Built by: Oxley Benjamin Franklin
- Architectural style: Gambrel roof wood barn
- NRHP reference No.: 08000303
- Added to NRHP: April 16, 2008

The Oxley Barn, near Quinter in Gove County, Kansas, is a wood-framed barn with a Gambrel roof. It was built in 1911 and expanded later. It was listed on the National Register of Historic Places in 2008.

It was built by Benjamin Franklin Oxley upon a concrete foundation.

The barn is 54 by 68 feet (16 m × 21 m) in plan, rising to 42 feet (13 m) and topped by a cupola with one of five lightning rods along the peak of the roof. It was expanded by construction of a lean-to a few years after its original construction in 1911.

It has also been known as the Big Red Barn. A black and white photo from the 1930s shows a farmer and horses in front of the large barn.

It is located about 1.5 miles (2.4 km) northeast of Quinter. It can be seen for miles, including from the Interstate 70.
