= Vaughn Flora =

American politician (1945–2022)

Member of the Kansas House of Representatives from the 57th district
- In office 1995 – January 12, 2009
- Succeeded by: Sean Gatewood

Personal details
- Born: January 17, 1945 Quinter, Kansas
- Died: March 17, 2022
- Party: Democratic
- Spouse(s): Rose Owen (m. 1963; div.); Julie Michael (m. 2013)
- Children: 3
- Education: Kansas State University

Vaughn Leonard Flora (January 17, 1945 – March 17, 2022) was an American politician who served in the Kansas House of Representatives for 14 years.

Flora was born in Quinter, Kansas, where he attended local public schools, and later attended Kansas State University, where he met his first wife, Rose Owen. He was involved with the real estate business, farmers union, and agricultural movement.

Flora served as a Democrat in the Kansas House of Representatives from 1995 to 2008 . He declined to run for re-election in 2008, and was succeeded by fellow Democrat Sean Gatewood. He died on March 17, 2022.
