= Broadview Stadium =

College football and track stadium

- "The Bullpen"

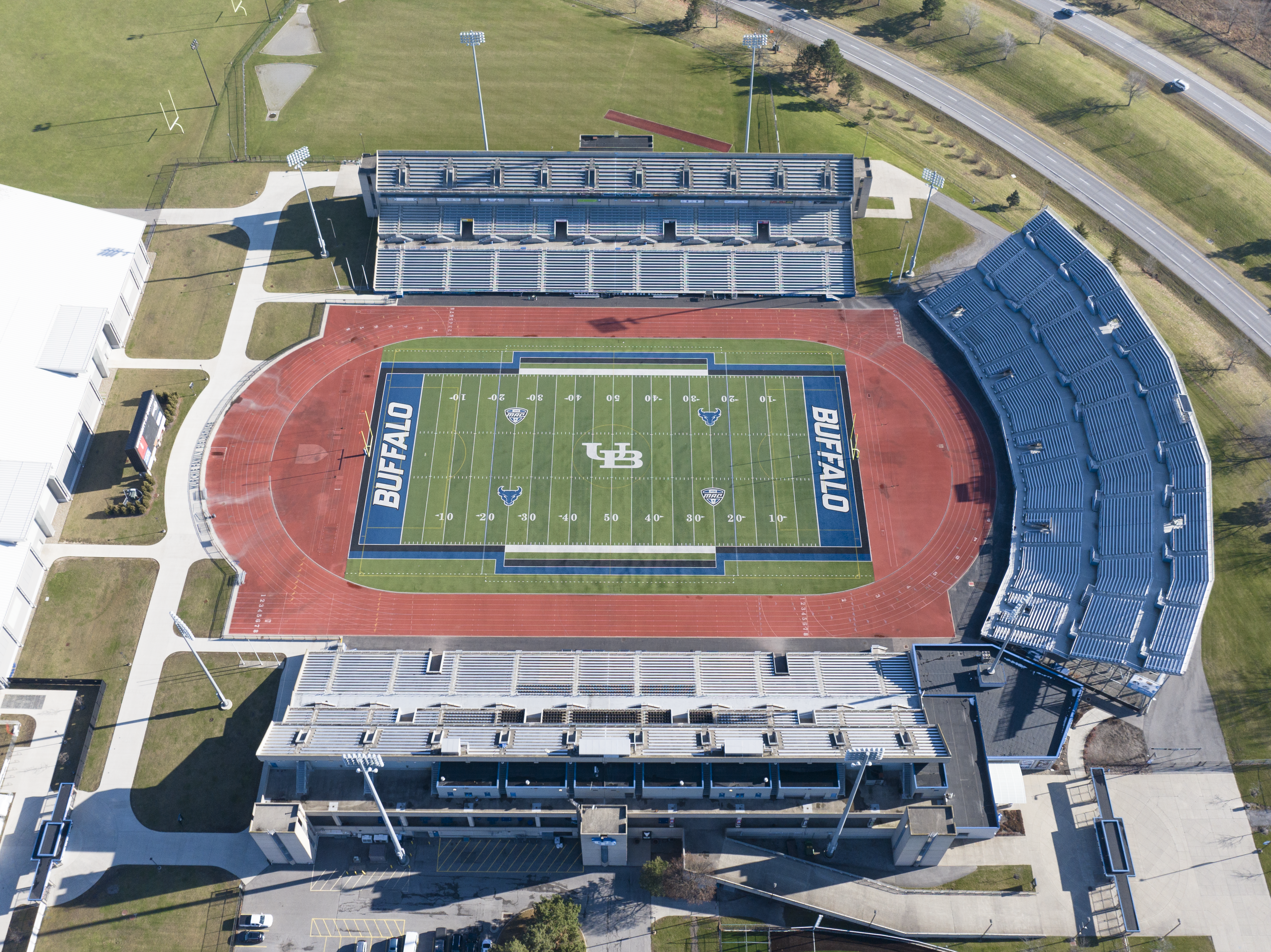
- Aerial view of the stadium in 2023
- Interactive map of Broadview Stadium
- Former names: University at Buffalo Stadium (1993–2026)
- Address: Webster Road; Amherst, NY; United States
- Coordinates: 42°59′57″N 78°46′39″W
- Owner: University at Buffalo
- Operator: Univ. at Buffalo Athletics
- Capacity: 25,013 (2017–present); 29,013 (1999–2017); 15,000 (1993–1999)
- Type: Stadium
- Surface: A-Turf Titan (2014–present); Momentum Turf (2005–2013); Natural grass (1993–2004)
- Current use: Football; Soccer

Construction
- Groundbreaking: September 17, 1991
- Opened: September 4, 1993; 33 years ago
- Expanded: 1999
- Cost: $23 million ($51.3 million in 2025 dollars)
- Architect: HOK Sport

Tenants
- Buffalo Bulls (NCAA) teams: football (1993–present); men's soccer (1993–2017); women's soccer (1993–present); men's and women's track and field (1993–present)

Website
- ubbulls.com/ub-stadium

Broadview Stadium (formerly UB Stadium) is a stadium in Amherst, New York, United States, on the campus of the University at Buffalo. It is primarily used for football, soccer, and track and field events, and is the home field of the Buffalo Bulls. The Stadium hosted the athletics events and the closing ceremonies of the 1993 World University Games held in July 1993. The first football game was held between the Bulls and Maine Black Bears on September 4, 1993.

== History ==
The stadium was built from 1991 to 1993 as the final piece of the school's "Run to Division I" drive, meant to bring UB football back to Division I status and as the feature athletics venue for the 1993 Summer Universiade. The program had been dropped for seven years in the 1970s, but returned at a lower level. The team had played at a much smaller, 4,000-seat UB Stadium (now known as Walter Kunz Stadium) from the time of its move to the town of Amherst north of Buffalo in 1985 until 1992. The current stadium opened in the summer of 1993, hosting the World University Games. The Bulls played their first six years in the stadium as a member of Division I-AA, finally making their return to Division I-A in 1999.

Jim Kelly hosted his third-annual StarGaze charity event at the venue in 1994. The stadium was the primary venue for the 1995 World Masters Athletics Championships. The stadium hosted the opening ceremonies of the 2010 Empire State Games on July 21, 2010.

On March 11, 2026, Broadview Federal Credit Union bought the naming rights and the stadium was renamed to Broadview Stadium.

== Location and configuration ==
The stadium consists of a north-south field surrounded by an eight-lane track. There are the original double-decked grandstands on either sideline spanning the entire length of the football field, a large bleacher grandstand around the south end of the track, and two shorter bleacher sections on the north side with the free-standing scoreboard located between them. The stadium is lit by the four large light towers near the corners of the stadium.

The stadium is located at the east side of UB's North Campus. Students living on the North Campus typically walk to the stadium from their on-campus housing or take the UB Stampede shuttle buses directly to Alumni Arena, which is nearby.

Broadview Stadium has a capacity of approximately 25,000. The sideline seating areas consist of two main grandstands which hold 15,000 (7,500 each). A large bleacher grandstand in the southern end of the stadium has a seating capacity of approximately 10,000. There is additional space on the north and south ends of the field level that is utilized as a standing room only space which accommodates approximately 3,000, though this is not factored into the capacity of the stadium.

In 1999, the school added two rounded bleacher sections to UB Stadium, raising the capacity to above 29,000. The southern section holds 10,000. Two half-sections were constructed in the north endzone, both with a capacity of 3,000 each (6,000 total). In October 2017, demolition work commenced on the northern endzones of the stadium in preparation for the program's new 92,000-square-foot (8,500 m^{2}), $18 million field house. The demolition of the bleachers brought the stadium's capacity down to about 25,000.

== Attendance records (football) ==
Rank	Attend.	Date	Opponent	Score
1	29,795	August 31, 2006	Temple	9–3 (OT)
2	29,013	September 11, 2004	Syracuse	17–37
3	26,511	November 18, 2000	Miami (OH)	16–17
4	24,714	September 12, 2014	Baylor	21–63
5	24,013	September 14, 2013	Stony Brook	26–23 (OT)
6	23,671	September 29, 2018	Army	13–42
7	23,602	October 5, 2013	Eastern Michigan	42–14
8	22,918	November 5, 2013	Ohio	30–3
9	22,676	September 22, 2007	Baylor	21–34
10	22,658	August 30, 2001	Rutgers	15–31
11	21,933	September 10, 2011	Stony Brook	35–7
12	21,870	September 12, 2009	Pittsburgh	27–54
13	21,719	October 18, 2008	Army	27–24 (OT)
14	21,139	September 20, 2014	Norfolk State	36–7
15	21,103	August 29, 2002	Lehigh	26–37
16	20,952	September 28, 2013	UConn	41–12
17	20,872	September 5, 2015	Albany	51–14
18	20,843	October 3, 2015	Bowling Green	22–28
19	20,841	September 27, 2014	Miami (OH)	35–27
20	20,835	September 11, 1999	Akron	10–17

== See also ==
- Broadview Arena
- Amherst Audubon Field
- List of NCAA Division I FBS football stadiums
