= Masters M65 800 metres world record progression =

This is the progression of world record improvements of the 800 metres M65 division of Masters athletics.

Key

Incomplete information Pending

Hand	Auto	Athlete	Nationality	Birthdate	Age	Location	Date	Ref
	2:13.74	Paul Forbes	Great Britain	20 November 1956	66 years, 313 days	Pescara	29 September 2023	
	2:14.33	Earl Fee	Canada	22 March 1929	66 years, 118 days	Buffalo	18 July 1995	
2:17.8 h		Derek Turnbull	New Zealand	5 December 1926	65 years, 101 days	Christchurch	15 March 1992	
2:20.5 h		Jack Stevens	Australia	23 November 1916	65 years, 263 days	Philadelphia	13 August 1982	
2:25.3 h		Frank Finger	United States	16 April 1915	65 years, 80 days	Philadelphia	5 July 1980	
