= Sean Gatewood =

American politician

Member of the Kansas House of Representatives from the 57th district
- In office January 12, 2009 – January 14, 2013
- Preceded by: Vaughn Flora
- Succeeded by: John Alcala

Personal details
- Born: August 7, 1980 (age 45)
- Party: Democratic
- Spouse: Tercia
- Education: Fort Hays State University

Sean Gatewood (born August 7, 1980) was a Democratic member of the Kansas House of Representatives, representing the 57th district in Kansas, from 2009 to 2013. He is a graduate of Fort Hays State University.
