= Trish King =

American high jumper

Patricia Morley "Trish" Porter (née King) (born August 27, 1962, in Atherton, California) is an American track and field athlete, specializing in the high jump. She represented her native country at the 1988 Olympics. She was married to Pat Porter also a 1988 and 1984 Olympian in 1991. Both her husband and her 15-year-old son Connor were killed in a private plane crash in Sedona, Arizona on July 26, 2012

== Early career ==
King claims she was always athletic. She was one of the first girls to play in Little League under threat of lawsuit.

"A lot of the boys resented me. They called me a tomboy. But I liked the competition. I was good, too."

An eighth grade coach advised her to avoid the high jump, but that was the event she aimed at. King attended Menlo-Atherton High School, finishing third at the 1979 CIF California State Meet and fourth the following year. Next she went to the University of Oregon but she struggled there as a freshman, not taking the sport seriously enough. With failure, she quit the sport as a sophomore and gained weight. When she decided to return to the sport, even her parents advised her to "put the toys away." When she returned she broadened her training to the multi event heptathlon. She graduated Oregon without any success with the team. She continued to train there where she "felt the condescending stares of her former coaches." 1986 showed signs of improvement. She cleared 6 feet in the high jump and finished 6th in the National Championships in the heptathlon.

== Olympic dreams ==
She continued training while working a full-time job, aiming at the 1988 Olympic Trials in Indianapolis. She slept on friends' couches and bounced between small meets trying to qualify. She made the minimum qualifying mark, exactly. Four days before the trials, she was informed her high jump mark was not accepted, it took two days of phone calls to fix the issue. When she arrived, she discovered the hotel room was only booked for 3 days of the 12-day meet. Her heptathlon started with her in fifth place after the first day, but she faded to finish in seventh place. With two days of rest, she qualified for the finals of the high jump, but her name was left off the list of eighteen other qualifiers. Left out of the press coverage, even her parents didn't know she had qualified.

In the final she stayed with the leaders to 1.90 m (6 ft 2 3/4 in). Her position on the team was assured with a second attempt clearance of 1.93 m (6 ft 3 3/4 in), which equalled the Olympic Trials record set by the other two qualifiers moments earlier. The bar went up and King was the first to clear a new record of 1.96 m (6 ft 5 in), which shocked the crowd, putting her in first place, her third personal record of the competition. The other two team members equalled her on their second attempts. That was as high as she would go, eventually finishing second when Louise Ritter set another record at 1.99 m (6 ft 6 1/4 in) in the competition. Ritter would surprise again winning the Gold medal later in the summer. Standing 8 cm shorter than the other two qualifiers (and most of the rest of the elite high jumpers) King was such an unknown commodity, third place jumper Coleen Sommer asked "Who are you?" Ritter told her she had made a lot of high jumpers angry by coming out of nowhere.

== Masters ==
As Patricia Porter, she has continued to compete in masters athletics. At a local meet in Albuquerque, she set the Masters W40 high jump world record at 1.76 m (5 ft 9 1/4 in), surpassing the nearly eight-year-old record of Debbie Brill of Canada. Porter's record would stand for six years. Her mark remains the American record. Four years later, she added the American W45 record.
