= Masters M55 long jump world record progression =

This is the progression of world record improvements of the long jump M55 division of Masters athletics.

Key

Incomplete information Pending

Distance	Wind	Athlete	Nationality	Birthdate	Location	Date
6.35	0.8	Stig Bäcklund	Finland	27.10.1939	Buffalo	21.07.1995
6.30		Tom Patsalis	United States	06.12.1921	Santa Ana	18.06.1977
6.01		Richmond "Boo" Morcom	United States	01.05.1921	Philadelphia	03.05.1976
