= Masters W85 long jump world record progression =

This is the progression of world record improvements of the long jump W85 division of Masters athletics.

Key

Incomplete information Pending

Distance	Wind	Athlete	Nationality	Birthdate	Age	Location	Date
3.11 m	-0.7	Christa Bortignon	Canada	29 January 1937	86 years, 207 days	Abbotsford	24 August 2023
3.08 m	-0.3	Christa Bortignon	Canada	29 January 1937	86 years, 195 days	Langley	12 August 2023
3.03 m	0.0	Christa Bortignon	Canada	29 January 1937	85 years, 211 days	Surrey	28 August 2022
3.01 m	-1.9	Christa Bortignon	Canada	29 January 1937	85 years, 113 days	Delta	22 May 2022
2.93 m	-0.3	Rosa Pedersen	Denmark	25 February 1930	85 years, 168 days	Lyon	12 August 2015
2.54 m	+1.1	Masako Hasegawa	Japan	1926	85	Wakayama	26 August 2011
2.39 m	-1.5	Norma Creais	Australia	1924	85	Sydney	11 October 2009
2.31 m	0.0	Helen Beauchamp	United States	1920	86	Louisville	27 June 2007
2.19 m	NWI	Ruth Frith	Australia	23 August 1909	85 years, 217 days	Sydney	28 March 1995
2.08 m	-1.0	Ruth Frith	Australia	23 August 1909	85	Buffalo	1995
