= Waldo McBurney =

American centenarian

Ralph Waldo McBurney
- Born: October 3, 1902; Quinter, Kansas
- Died: July 8, 2009 (aged 106); Quinter, Kansas
- Other name: Waldo McBurney
- Occupation: Beekeeper

Ralph Waldo McBurney (October 3, 1902 – July 8, 2009) was said to be the oldest worker in the United States. Until a relatively short time before his death at age 106, he lived and worked as a beekeeper in the city of Quinter, Kansas. He was born in Quinter and had lived in the Quinter area for many years. He also lived near the Kansas cities of Sterling and Beloit. In his last years, he was recognized nationwide for his longevity.

== Personal life ==
He was the third of six children born to George R. and Mary B. (Huston) McBurney. After two years at Sterling College, he transferred to the Kansas State Agricultural College (now Kansas State University), from which he graduated in 1927. Two years later, he married the former Irene Spear; together, they had three children. After her death in 1960, he married the former Vernice Forman in 1962, twelve years younger than he; Vernice died in 2016 at the age of 102. He suffered a heart attack in 1994, but continued competing afterward. He died at the Gove County Medical Center in Quinter on July 8, 2009.

McBurney served as an elder in the Quinter congregation of the Reformed Presbyterian Church of North America, and his father and his son Kenneth (who survived him) both served as ministers in the same denomination. His father, too, was long-lived, being the oldest minister in the denomination at his death.

== Sports ==
He held multiple Masters athletics world records for track and field events for his age level. In 2004, he published an autobiography entitled My First 100 Years. He credited his success partially to his age; as he said in his autobiography, "It is easy to earn gold medals when one has no competition in one's age group!" His continued competition at his age attracted the attention of gerontologists.

== Recognition ==
In October 2006, McBurney was recognized as the oldest worker in America by Experience Works. As a result, he was featured in newspapers nationwide and on the CBS television program Assignment America. He is also a past recipient of the "Hometown Health Hero" award given by the Governor of Kansas.
