= Earl Owens =

American long-distance runner

Earl Owens is a long-distance runner. He attended the University of North Carolina from 1967 to 1971 and participated in Cross-Country and Indoor and Outdoor Track & Field Coached by Joe Hilton, Head Coach, and Boyd Newnam, Running Coach.

Now running from Dunwoody, Georgia, he is the American Record Holder in three long-distance track events; the 15,000 meter, 10 mile and one hour runs, plus he claims the World Record in the obscure 100 x 1 mile relay and 10 x 10 mile relay.

== Achievements ==
- North Carolina Triathlete of the Year
- 1995 World Veterans Championships - 2nd 10,000 meters, 3rd 5,000 meters
- American record holder - 15,000 meters, 10 mile run, 1 hour run (all on track)
- National Road Racing and Track & Field Champion - 10,000 meters
- World record holder men's 100 x 1 mile relay and 10 x 10 mile relay
