= Masters W70 1500 metres world record progression =

This is the progression of world record improvements of the 1500 metres W70 division of Masters athletics.

Key

Incomplete information Pending

Hand	Auto	Athlete	Nationality	Birthdate	Location	Date
	6:00.50	Rimma Vasina	Russia	23.10.1940	Lignano	15.09.2011
	6:04.59	Cecilia Morrison	United Kingdom	27.06.1940	Cardiff	03.07.2010
	6:12.14	Elfriede Hodapp	Germany	15.06.1935	Vaterstetten	17.07.2005
	6:14.52	Nina Naumenko	Russia	15.06.1925	Buffalo	22.07.1995
	6:34.48	Britta Tibbling	Sweden	19.03.1918	Verona	29.06.1988
	6:45.49	Johanna Luther	Germany	02.08.1913	Brighton	25.08.1984
