= Quinter, Kansas =

City in Gove County, Kansas

- City
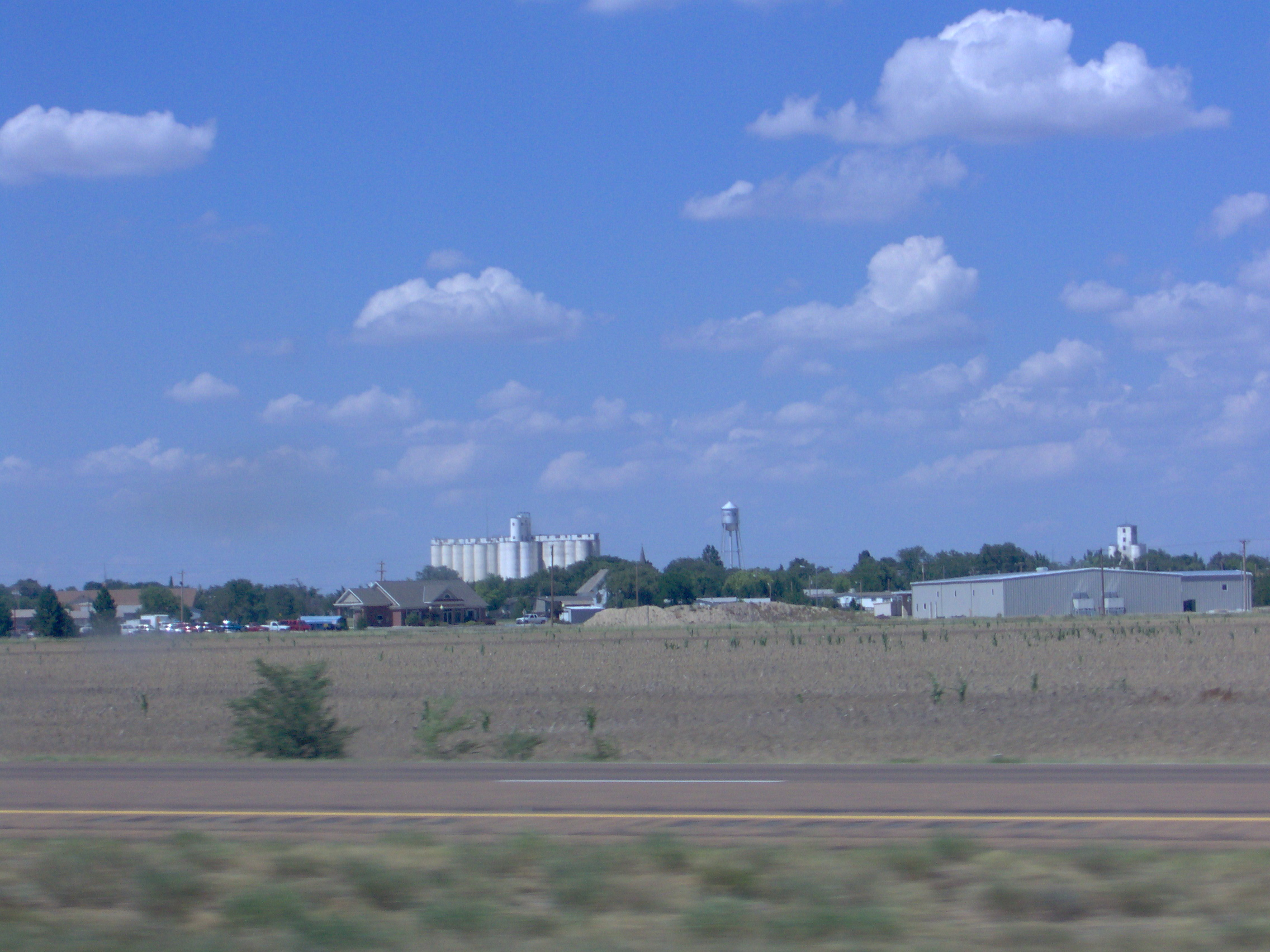
- View from Interstate 70 (2006)

- Location within Gove County and Kansas

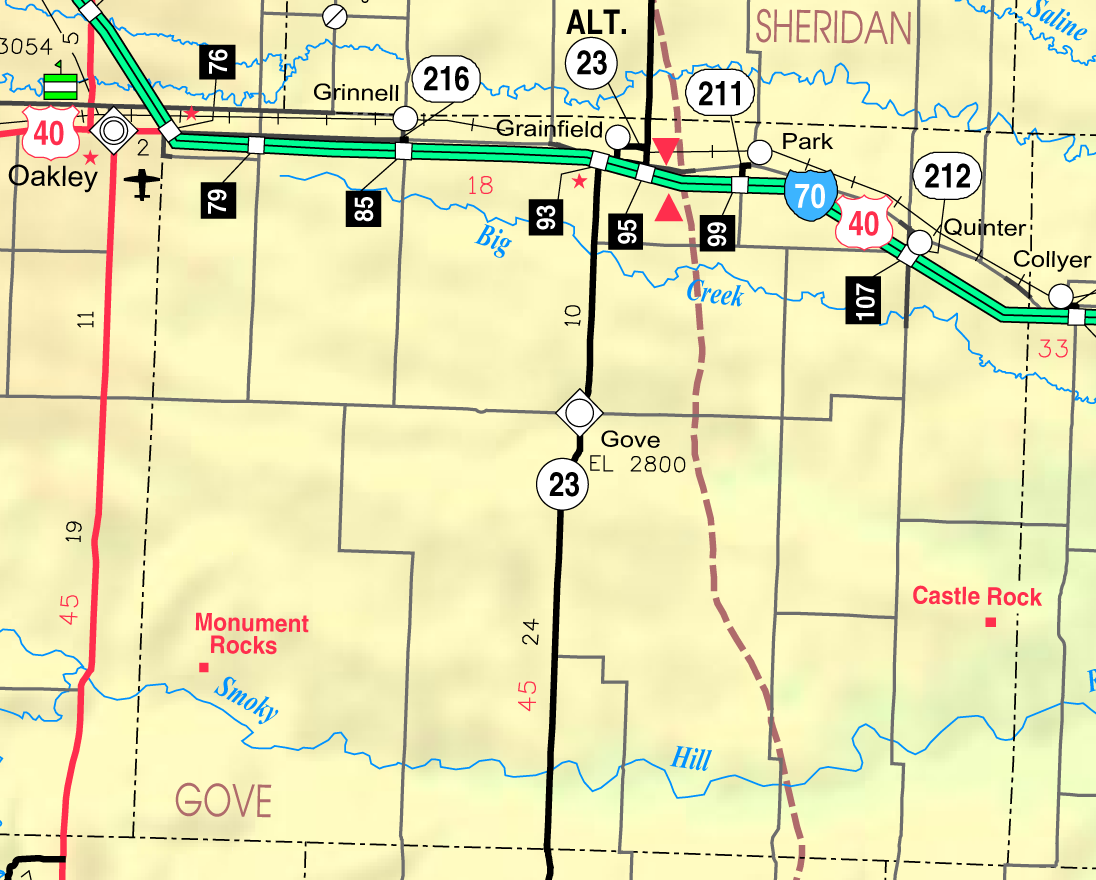
- KDOT map of Gove County (legend)
- Coordinates: 39°04′00″N 100°14′05″W
- Country: United States
- State: Kansas
- County: Gove
- Founded: 1885 (Familton)
- Incorporated: 1909 (Quinter)
- Named for: James Quinter

Area
  - Total: 1.00 sq mi (2.60 km^{2})
  - Land: 1.00 sq mi (2.60 km^{2})
  - Water: 0 sq mi (0.00 km^{2})
- Elevation: 2,674 ft (815 m)

Population (2020)
  - Total: 929
  - Density: 925/sq mi (357/km^{2})
- Time zone: UTC-6 (CST)
  - Summer (DST): UTC-5 (CDT)
- ZIP Code: 67752
- Area code: 785
- FIPS code: 20-58250
- GNIS ID: 2396302
- Website: cityofquinter.com

Quinter is a city in Gove County, Kansas, United States. As of the 2020 census, its population was 929.

== History ==
The city of Quinter is built at the location of an old railroad switching site called Melota. A community named Familton' was built there in 1885, consisting originally of a hotel. The U.S. government would not establish a post office under the Familton name, because of possible confusion with other names in the state, so another had to be chosen. The name Quinter was settled upon, named after Rev. James Quinter, a local Baptist Brethren minister.

Longtime resident Waldo McBurney, age 104, was proclaimed the oldest worker in the United States in national media in November 2006 and again in 2020.

== Geography ==
According to the United States Census Bureau, the city has a total area of 0.99 square miles (2.56 km^{2}), all of it land.

=== Climate ===
Climate data for Quinter, Kansas (1991–2020 normals, extremes 1894, 1930–present)
Month	Jan	Feb	Mar	Apr	May	Jun	Jul	Aug	Sep	Oct	Nov	Dec	Year
Record high °F (°C)	82 (28)	85 (29)	91 (33)	99 (37)	105 (41)	111 (44)	113 (45)	111 (44)	110 (43)	97 (36)	88 (31)	83 (28)	113 (45)
Mean daily maximum °F (°C)	40.7 (4.8)	43.7 (6.5)	54.6 (12.6)	63.8 (17.7)	73.6 (23.1)	85.0 (29.4)	89.9 (32.2)	87.1 (30.6)	79.7 (26.5)	66.2 (19.0)	52.9 (11.6)	42.0 (5.6)	64.9 (18.3)
Daily mean °F (°C)	29.1 (−1.6)	31.9 (−0.1)	41.3 (5.2)	50.5 (10.3)	61.0 (16.1)	72.2 (22.3)	77.4 (25.2)	74.9 (23.8)	66.7 (19.3)	53.2 (11.8)	40.5 (4.7)	30.8 (−0.7)	52.5 (11.4)
Mean daily minimum °F (°C)	17.4 (−8.1)	20.0 (−6.7)	28.1 (−2.2)	37.1 (2.8)	48.4 (9.1)	59.4 (15.2)	64.8 (18.2)	62.7 (17.1)	53.6 (12.0)	40.2 (4.6)	28.1 (−2.2)	19.5 (−6.9)	39.9 (4.4)
Record low °F (°C)	−20 (−29)	−23 (−31)	−25 (−32)	3 (−16)	23 (−5)	36 (2)	41 (5)	44 (7)	26 (−3)	8 (−13)	−6 (−21)	−23 (−31)	−25 (−32)
Average precipitation inches (mm)	0.48 (12)	0.73 (19)	1.30 (33)	1.97 (50)	3.84 (98)	3.04 (77)	3.57 (91)	3.21 (82)	1.83 (46)	1.85 (47)	0.86 (22)	0.83 (21)	23.51 (597)
Average snowfall inches (cm)	3.7 (9.4)	5.2 (13)	3.9 (9.9)	0.8 (2.0)	0.2 (0.51)	0.0 (0.0)	0.0 (0.0)	0.0 (0.0)	0.0 (0.0)	0.7 (1.8)	1.6 (4.1)	4.1 (10)	20.2 (51)
Average precipitation days (≥ 0.01 in)	3.0	4.2	5.4	7.7	9.1	8.3	8.1	7.9	6.1	5.8	3.9	3.6	73.1
Average snowy days (≥ 0.1 in)	1.8	2.6	1.7	0.5	0.1	0.0	0.0	0.0	0.0	0.3	1.2	2.5	10.7
Source: NOAA

== Demographics ==
Historical population
Census	Pop.	Note	%±
1910	450		—
1920	383		−14.9%
1930	570		48.8%
1940	481		−15.6%
1950	741		54.1%
1960	776		4.7%
1970	930		19.8%
1980	951		2.3%
1990	945		−0.6%
2000	961		1.7%
2010	918		−4.5%
2020	929		1.2%
U.S. Decennial Census

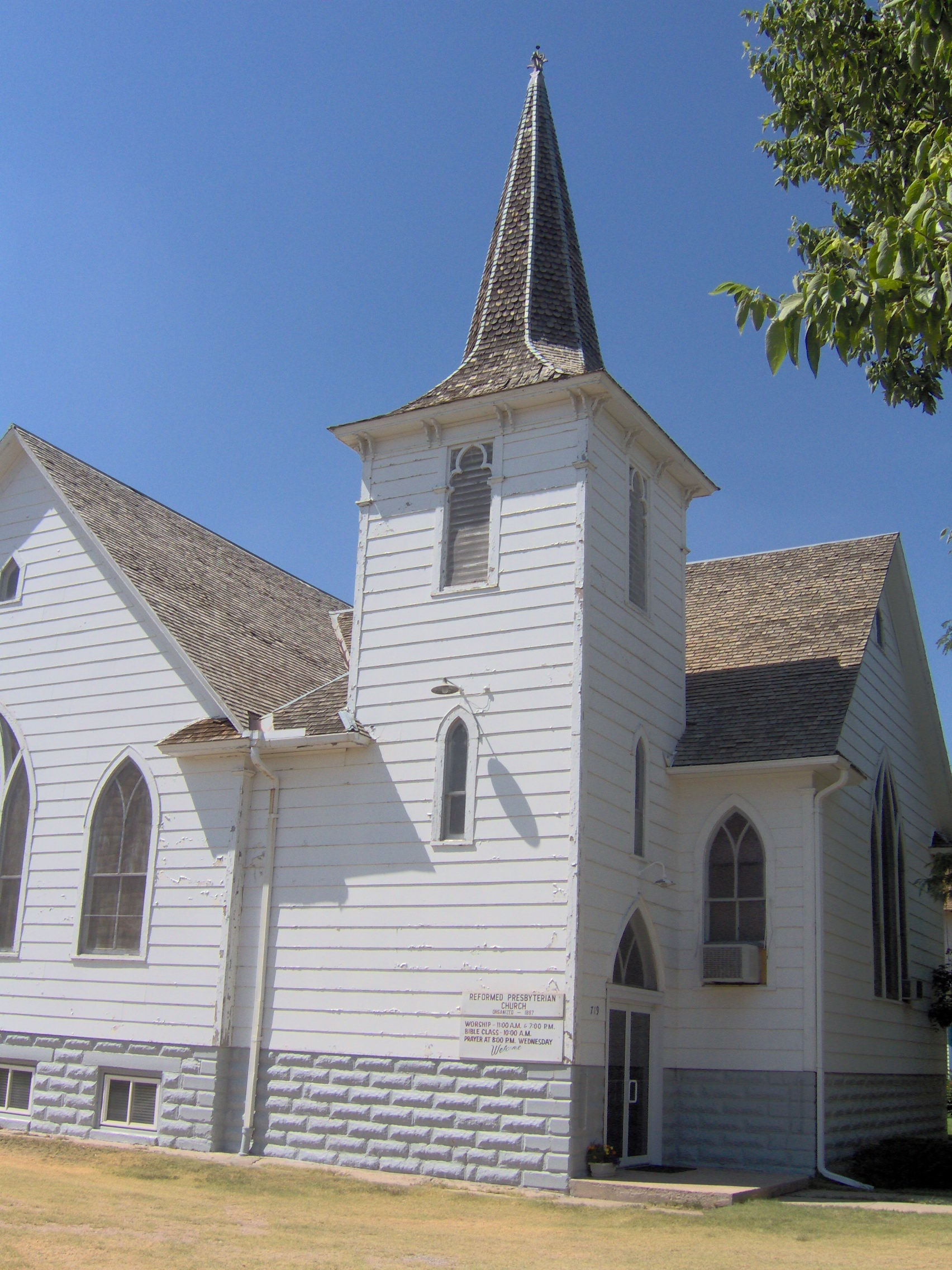
Quinter Reformed Presbyterian Church (2006)

=== 2020 census ===
The 2020 United States census counted 929 people, 378 households, and 238 families in Quinter. The population density was 924.4 per square mile (356.9/km^{2}). There were 438 housing units at an average density of 435.8 per square mile (168.3/km^{2}). The racial makeup was 92.03% (855) white or European American (90.74% non-Hispanic white), 0.32% (3) black or African-American, 0.32% (3) Native American or Alaska Native, 1.18% (11) Asian, 0.11% (1) Pacific Islander or Native Hawaiian, 0.75% (7) from other races, and 5.27% (49) from two or more races. Hispanic or Latino of any race was 2.48% (23) of the population.

Of the 378 households, 28.6% had children under the age of 18; 53.2% were married couples living together; 25.7% had a female householder with no spouse or partner present. 33.9% of households consisted of individuals and 15.6% had someone living alone who was 65 years of age or older. The average household size was 1.9 and the average family size was 2.6. The percent of those with a bachelor's degree or higher was estimated to be 15.1% of the population.

24.0% of the population was under the age of 18, 7.2% from 18 to 24, 21.0% from 25 to 44, 21.6% from 45 to 64, and 26.2% who were 65 years of age or older. The median age was 43.4 years. For every 100 females, there were 108.8 males. For every 100 females ages 18 and older, there were 113.9 males.

The 2016–2020 5-year American Community Survey estimates show that the median household income was $51,500 (with a margin of error of +/- $12,183) and the median family income was $69,643 (+/- $6,213). Males had a median income of $50,391 (+/- $4,792) versus $26,094 (+/- $8,638) for females. The median income for those above 16 years old was $34,453 (+/- $3,988). Approximately, 5.7% of families and 8.8% of the population were below the poverty line, including 12.0% of those under the age of 18 and 7.4% of those ages 65 or over.

=== 2010 census ===
As of the census of 2010, there were 918 people, 374 households, and 251 families residing in the city. The population density was 927.3 inhabitants per square mile (358.0/km^{2}). There were 425 housing units at an average density of 429.3 per square mile (165.8/km^{2}). The racial makeup of the city was 98.3% White, 0.3% African American, 0.4% Asian, 0.3% from other races, and 0.7% from two or more races. Hispanic or Latino of any race were 2.2% of the population.

There were 374 households, of which 29.1% had children under the age of 18 living with them, 58.8% were married couples living together, 6.1% had a female householder with no husband present, 2.1% had a male householder with no wife present, and 32.9% were non-families. 29.9% of all households were made up of individuals, and 18.5% had someone living alone who was 65 years of age or older. The average household size was 2.30 and the average family size was 2.87.

The median age in the city was 47.9 years. 23.6% of residents were under the age of 18; 6% were between the ages of 18 and 24; 17.3% were from 25 to 44; 24.5% were from 45 to 64; and 28.6% were 65 years of age or older. The gender makeup of the city was 47.2% male and 52.8% female.

== Education ==
The community is served by Quinter USD 293 public school district.

== Transportation ==
The concurrent Interstate 70 and U.S. Route 40 pass just south of the city. Old U.S. Route 40 and the current K-212 pass through the city, as does a major Union Pacific Railroad line.

== Notable people ==
- Brent Barrett, American actor and tenor
- Vaughn Flora, Kansas state legislator
- Scott Huffman, 1996 Olympic pole vaulter and former American record holder
- Robert Maxwell, World War II combat veteran and Medal of Honor recipient
- Waldo McBurney, centenarian
- Maggie McIntosh, Maryland state legislator

== See also ==
- Monument Rocks (Kansas)
