= Masters W40 high jump world record progression =

This is the progression of world record improvements of the high jump W40 division of Masters athletics.

Key

Incomplete information Pending

Height	Athlete	Nationality	Birthdate	Location	Date
1.90	Romary Rifka	Mexico	23.12.1970	Veracruz	05.08.2011
1.87	Irina Mykhalchenko	Ukraine	20.01.1972	Yalta	13.06.2012
1.78	Julia Machin Bennett	United Kingdom	26.03.1970	Milton Keynes	22.05.2010
1.76A	Patricia Porter	United States	27.08.1962	Albuquerque	06.06.2004
1.75	Debbie Brill	Canada	10.03.1953	Victoria	10.08.1996
1.72	Carmen Karg	Germany	19.08.1954	Buffalo	16.07.1995
1.70	Jordanka Blagojeva	Bulgaria	19.01.1947	Verona	25.06.1988
1.66	Martina Lobinger	Germany	10.02.1945	Bonn	21.09.1985
1.63	Dorothy Tyler	United Kingdom	14.03.1920	London	02.08.1961
