= Masters W45 triple jump world record progression =

This is the progression of world record improvements of the triple jump W45 division of Masters athletics.

Key: Incomplete information Pending Never ratified or Indoor mark before 2000, not acceptable for record

Distance	Wind	Athlete	Nationality	Birthdate	Location	Date
12.30	+0.1	Barbara Lah	Italy	24.03.1972	San Biagio di Callalta	11.05.2019
12.01	+0.0	Murielle Glovil	France	07.07.1968	Lyon	15.08.2015
12.39	+0.0	Murielle Glovil	France	07.07.1968	Amiens	27.06.2015
11.98		Akiko Oohinata	Japan	14.12.1949	Buffalo	16.07.1995
11.39 i		Danielle Desmier	France	27.07.1949	Saumur	22.01.1995
11.22		Margaret Taylor	Australia	06.04.1948	Canberra	19.03.1994
