= Earl Fee =

Canadian track and field athlete

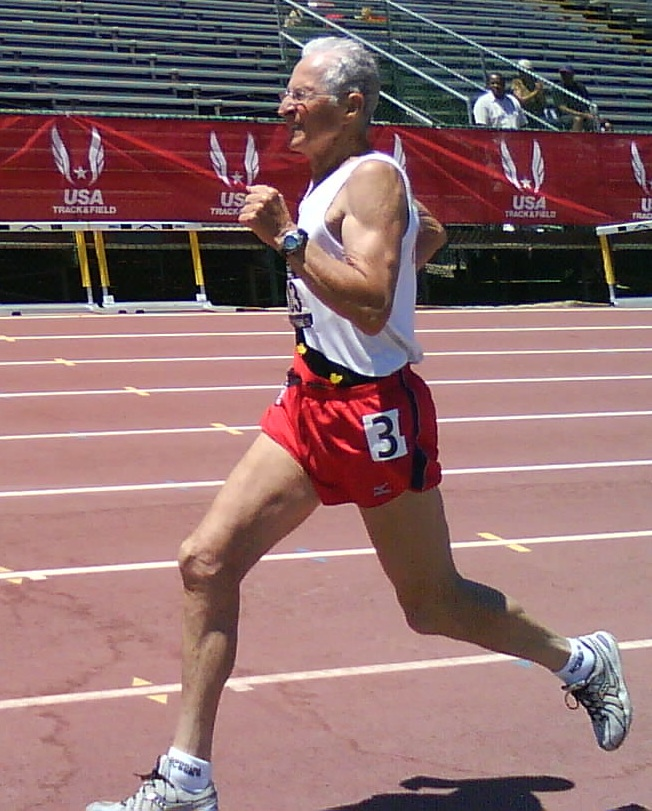
Earl Fee at the 2010 USATF Masters Championships in Sacramento, California

Earl Fee (born March 22, 1929) is a Canadian track and field athlete.

== Biography ==
After being an above average high school and collegiate runner, Fee spent a career working as a nuclear engineer for the Atomic Energy of Canada Limited, otherwise known as CANDU. After a 33-year hiatus from competitive athletics, he joined his sons Curtis and Tyler in a running program. At age 56, he ran his first race in masters athletics. Since then, he has set 60 age group world records including the still current records in the M80 and M85 200 metre hurdles, the M85, and M90 400 metres, and the M65, M70, M75, M80, M85, and M90 800 metres. He has in 2020 a total of 17 indoor and outdoor WMA age group records including an indoor M75 mile and a M75 4 × 400 m 80 world record.

In 2005 and 2019 the World Masters Athletics recognized him as the world master male athlete of the year. Fee is also the oldest athlete in the world to ever run the 400m under his age, based on his world record of 89.15 seconds at age 90 in 2020.

He has taken his literary skills and coaching knowledge to write The Complete Guide to Running: How to Be a Champion from 9 To 90, which was published in 2005 and again in 2007 due to popularity. In 2011 his large anti-aging book 100 Years Young the Natural Way -- Body Mind Spirit Training was released. In 2012, he released: a coloured book of poetry "The Wonder of it All", in 2019 his autobiography book " Earl Fee Is Running", and in 2020 another poetry book "Living with Spirit".
