= Masters men high jump world record progression =

This is the progression of world record improvements of the high jump of Masters athletics.

Key

Incomplete information Pending Indoor mark
IAAF includes indoor marks in the record list since 2000, but WMA does not follow that practice.

== Men 35 ==
Height	Athlete	Nationality	Birthdate	Location	Date
1.98 i	Harold Osborn	United States	13.04.1899	New York City	16.03.1935
2.035	Dave Albritton	United States	13.04.1913	Berea	26.06.1948
2.16	Viktor Bolshov	Soviet Union	23.05.1939	Moscow	21.06.1974
2.16	Viktor Bolshov	Soviet Union	23.05.1939	Moscow	24.07.1974
2.17	Dimitrios Kattis	Greece	07.02.1956	Athens	06.09.1991
2.20	Brian Stanton	United States	19.02.1961	Long Beach	16.03.1996
2.20	Doug Nordquist	United States	20.12.1958	Long Beach	08.06.1996
2.26 i	Carlo Thränhardt	Germany	05.07.1957	Otterberg	13.02.1993
2.25	Carlo Thränhardt	Germany	05.07.1957	Rehlingen	31.05.1993
2.26 i	Carlo Thränhardt	Germany	05.07.1957	Otterberg	19.02.1994
2.27 i	Cristian Popescu	Romania	12.08.1962	Pireas	22.02.1998
2.25	Igor Paklin	Kyrgyzstan	15.06.1963	Bishkek	10.07.1999
2.26	Dalton Grant	United Kingdom	08.04.1966	Bangor	21.07.2002
2.27 i	Charles Austin	United States	19.12.1967	New York City	07.02.2003
2.30 i	Charles Austin	United States	19.12.1967	Boston	02.03.2003
2.27	Charles Austin	United States	19.12.1967	Austin	05.04.2003
2.27	Dragutin Topić	Serbia	12.03.1971	Sofia	07.07.2007
2.30 i	Dragutin Topić	Serbia	12.03.1971	Novi Sad	07.02.2008
2.31	Dragutin Topić	Serbia	12.03.1971	Kragujevac	28.07.2009
2.31	James Nieto	United States	02.11.1976	New York	09.06.2012

== Men 40 ==
Height	Athlete	Nationality	Birthdate	Location	Date	Video
1.87	Wolfgang Boneder	Germany	20.10.1894	Regensburg	13.07.1935	
2.05	Egon Nilsson	Sweden	07.08.1926	Ljungby	25.09.1966	
2.06A	John Hartfield	United States	01.11.1944	Fort Collins	01.09.1985	
2.07	Istvan Major	Hungary	20.05.1949	Budapest	02.07.1990	
2.10 i	Dwight Stones	United States	06.12.1953	Fairfax	06.02.1994	
2.10 i	Dwight Stones	United States	06.12.1953	Indianapolis	25.03.1994	
2.08	Dwight Stones	United States	19.07.1995	Buffalo	19.07.1995	
2.11	Jim Barrineau	United States	25.06.1955	Buffalo	19.07.1995	
2.15	Glen Conley	United States	09.01.1957	Albany	02.08.1997	
2.15	Dalton Grant	United Kingdom	08.04.1966	Albertville	10.07.2008	
2.21	Dragutin Topić	Serbia	12.03.1971	Kragujevac	25.06.2011	
2.22	Dragutin Topić	Serbia	12.03.1971	Kragujevac	14.07.2011	
2.23	Dragutin Topić	Serbia	12.03.1971	Belgrade	02.08.2011	
2.24	Dragutin Topić	Serbia	12.03.1971	Kragujevac	06.08.2011	
2.25	Dragutin Topić	Serbia	12.03.1971	Bar	01.05.2012	
2.28	Dragutin Topić	Serbia	12.03.1971	Belgrade	20.05.2012	

== Men 45 ==
Height	Athlete	Nationality	Birthdate	Location	Date
1.70	Wolfgang Boneder	Germany	20.10.1894		. .1940
1.76	Wolfgang Boneder	Germany	20.10.1894	Poznań	04.07.1943
1.80	Wolfgang Boneder	Germany	20.10.1894	Poznań	. .1944
1.57	Jonathan Sharp	United States	25.01.1921	Randall's Island	09.08.1969
1.625	Richmond "Boo" Morcom	United States	01.05.1921	Los Angeles	20.06.1970
1.625	Richmond "Boo" Morcom	United States	01.05.1921	San Diego	04.07.1970
1.625	Richmond "Boo" Morcom	United States	01.05.1921	Raleigh	03.04.1971
1.67	Salvator Martinez	Spain	06.05.1926	Bilbao	27.06.1971
1.68i	Ed Austin	United States	22.10.1929	Anaheim	25.01.1975
1.68	Ed Austin	United States	22.10.1929	Orange	04.05.1975
1.78	Ed Austin	United States	22.10.1929	Fullerton	07.06.1975
1.78	Herm Wyatt	United States	13.09.1931	Los Gatos	17.06.1978
1.83	Richard "Dick" Richardson	United States	15.05.1933	Atlanta, Georgia	07.08.1978
1.83	Herm Wyatt	United States	13.09.1931	Santa Ana	23.06.1979
1.83	Richard "Dick" Richardson	United States	15.05.1933	Gresham	06.07.1979
1.90	Herm Wyatt	United States	13.09.1931	Los Angeles	19.04.1980
2.00	Asko Pesonen	Finland	15.04.1943	Iisalmi	03.09.1988
2.04 i	Dennis Lewis	United States	20.03.1959	Ypsilanti	11.02.2006
2.00	Bruce McBarnette	United States	07.10.1957	Durham	06.05.2006
2.01	Marco Segatel	Italy	23.03.1962	Novara	21.04.2007
2.02	Marco Segatel	Italy	23.03.1962	Bovisio Masciago	28.04.2007
2.04	Marco Segatel	Italy	23.03.1962	Cernusco sul Naviglio	19.07.2007
2.05	Charles Austin	United States	19.12.1967	San Marcos	21.06.2013

== Men 50 ==
Height	Athlete	Nationality	Birthdate	Location	Date
1.76	Wolfgang Boneder	Germany	20.10.1894	Neustadt	20.07.1947
1.675	Orvald Gillett	United States	02.06.1919	San Diego	04.07.1969
1.73	Orvald Gillett	United States	02.06.1919	Glendale	11.12.1971
1.73	Richmond "Boo" Morcom	United States	01.05.1921	Randall's Island	22.07.1972
1.75	John C. Brown	United States	04.12.1929	Philadelphia	05.07.1980
1.75	John C. Brown	United States	04.12.1929	Christchurch	12.01.1981
1.78 i	John C. Brown	United States	04.12.1929	Liberty	15.02.1981
1.79	John C. Brown	United States	04.12.1929	Dallas	25.07.1981
1.79	Herm Wyatt	United States	13.09.1931	Los Gatos	12.06.1982
1.81	Herm Wyatt	United States	13.09.1931	Eugene	27.06.1982
1.85	Herm Wyatt	United States	13.09.1931	Los Gatos	21.05.1983
1.87	Herm Wyatt	United States	13.09.1931	Los Gatos	03.07.1983
1.88	Herm Wyatt	United States	13.09.1931	Los Gatos	20.08.1983
1.88	Horst Mandl	Austria	08.01.1936	Verona	27.06.1988
1.88	Dieter Wille	Germany	06.07.1943	Miyazaki	10.10.1993
1.89	Mark Chelnov	Ukraine	15.03.1944	Athens	11.06.1994
1.90	Asko Pesonen	Finland	15.04.1943	Leppavirta	24.09.1995
2.00 i	Thomas Zacharias	Germany	02.01.1947	Birmingham	02.03.1997
1.98	Thomas Zacharias	Germany	02.01.1947	Baunatal	17.05.1997

== Men 55 ==
Height	Athlete	Nationality	Birthdate	Location	Date
1.56	Wolfgang Boneder	Germany	20.10.1894	Regensburg	06.05.1950
1.47	Bill Morales	United States	16.10.1916	Van Nuys	08.04.1972
1.57	Robert Ogle	United States	20.08.1918		01.06.1974
1.575	Orvald Gillett	United States	02.06.1919	Vancouver	30.06.1974
1.68	Burl Gist	United States	01.02.1920	Fullerton	07.06.1975
1.69	Richmond "Boo" Morcom	United States	01.05.1921	Brockton	27.07.1976
1.69 i	John C. Brown	United States	04.12.1929	Lincoln	10.03.1985
1.71 i	John C. Brown	United States	04.12.1929	Lincoln	11.01.1986
1.71	John C. Brown	United States	04.12.1929	Palm Beach	26.04.1986
1.73	John C. Brown	United States	04.12.1929	Lincoln	13.07.1986
1.74	John C. Brown	United States	04.12.1929	Uniondale	18.07.1986
1.75	Herm Wyatt	United States	13.09.1931	Goleta	04.10.1986
1.79	Herm Wyatt	United States	13.09.1931	Eugene	23.05.1987
1.80	Asko Pesonen	Finland	15.04.1943	Kiuruvesi	11.06.1998
1.81	Asko Pesonen	Finland	15.04.1943	Leppävirta	03.08.1998
1.82	Asko Pesonen	Finland	15.04.1943	Viitasaari	25.08.1998
1.83	Jaroslav Hanuš	Czech Republic	16.04.1943	Cesenatico	13.09.1998
1.84	Thomas Zacharias	Germany	02.01.1947	Arrecife	25.01.2006
1.85 i	Vladimir Kuntsevich	Russia	06.08.1952	Moscow	05.04.2008
1.85	Jaroslav Lorenç	Czech Republic	22.09.1953	Humpolec	27.09.2008
1.87	Carlo Thränhardt	Germany	05.07.1957	Eberstadt	17.08.2012
1.88 i	Bruce McBarnette	United States	07.10.1957	Landover	22.03.2013
1.89	Carlo Thränhardt	Germany	05.07.1957	Bühll	21.06.2013
1.90	Carlo Thränhardt	Germany	05.07.1957	Eberstadt	23.08.2013
1.91	Marco Segatel	Italy	23.03.1962	Orvieto	08.07.2017

== Men 60 ==
Height	Athlete	Nationality	Birthdate	Location	Date
1.60	Wolfgang Boneder	Germany	20.10.1894	Fürth	01.06.1956
1.445	Virgil McIntyre	United States	20.01.1911	Orange	02.05.1971
1.445	Stan Thompson	United States	09.10.1910	Honolulu	08.07.1972
1.46	Stan Thompson	United States	09.10.1910	Hawaii	26.10.1972
1.48	Ian Hume	Canada	20.08.1914	White Plains	09.08.1975
1.49	Ian Hume	Canada	20.08.1914		20.09.1975
1.52	Cornelius Warnerdam	United States	22.06.1915	Glendale	06.12.1975
1.53	Ian Hume	Canada	20.08.1914	Manchester	07.08.1976
1.54	Ian Hume	Canada	20.08.1914	Gothenburg	08.08.1977
1.57	Erik Stai	Norway	01.02.1920	Gothenburg	08.08.1977
1.59	Burl Gist	United States	01.02.1920	Philadelphia	05.07.1980
1.59	Burl Gist	United States	01.02.1920	Los Angeles	28.04.1984
1.60	Hans Overland	Norway	03.08.1924	Brighton	22.08.1984
1.61	James Gillcrist	United States	28.10.1927	Sarasota	21.05.1989
1.62	James Gillcrist	United States	28.10.1927	Miami	11.06.1989
1.64	James Gillcrist	United States	28.10.1927	San Diego	21.07.1989
1.66	James Gillcrist	United States	28.10.1927	Eugene	05.08.1989
1.66	James Gillcrist	United States	28.10.1927	Lake Worth	21.04.1990
1.67	James Gillcrist	United States	28.10.1927	Orlando	18.05.1991
1.68	James Gillcrist	United States	28.10.1927		unk.1991
1.68	James Gillcrist	United States	28.10.1927		19.09.1992
1.68	Milton Newton	United States	06.11.1933	unk	unk.1994
1.69	Milton Newton	United States	06.11.1933	unk	20.07.1994
1.69	Milton Newton	United States	06.11.1933	Los Angeles	10.06.1995
1.70	Horst Mandl	Austria	08.01.1936	Malmö	21.07.1996
1.72	Phil Fehlen	United States	03.07.1935	Saskatoon	04.07.1998
1.74	Asko Pesonen	Finland	15.04.1943	Pyhäntä	03.06.2003
1.76	Asko Pesonen	Finland	15.04.1943	Leppavirta	14.09.2003
1.77	Thomas Zacharias	Germany	02.01.1947	Arrecife	24.03.2007
1.78	Thomas Zacharias	Germany	02.01.1947	Arrecife	02.04.2007
1.79	Thomas Zacharias	Germany	02.01.1947	Arrecife	15.04.2007
1.80	Thomas Zacharias	Germany	02.01.1947	Arrecife	27.04.2007
1.81	Vladimir Kuntsevich	Russia	06.08.1952	Zittau	16.08.2012
1.81 i	Rüdiger Weber	Germany	13.06.1963	Dortmund	03.03.2024
1.82	Rüdiger Weber	Germany	13.06.1963	Erding	16.06.2024

== Men 65 ==
Height	Athlete	Nationality	Birthdate	Age	Location	Date	Ref
1.50 m	Wolfgang Boneder	Germany	20 October 1894			1963	
1.36 m	Virgil McIntyre	United States	20 January 1911	65 years, 165 days	Gresham	3 July 1976	
1.37 m	Stan Thompson	United States	9 October 1910	65 years, 268 days	Honolulu	3 July 1976	
1.37 m	Stan Thompson	United States	9 October 1910	66 years, 169 days	Honolulu	27 March 1977	
1.37 m	Bud Deacon	United States	28 April 1911	66 years, 52 days	Gresham	19 June 1977	
1.46 m	Ivar Sand	Norway	17 July 1912	65 years, 22 days	Gothenburg	8 August 1977	
1.47	Richard O'Rafferty	Ireland	10.11.1913	Hanover	28.07.1979		
1.49 i	Ian Hume	Canada	20.08.1914	Syracuse	29.03.1980		
1.50	Ian Hume	Canada	20.08.1914	Philadelphia	05.07.1980		
1.50	Erik Stai	Norway	29.01.1915	Larvik	08.08.1981		
1.51	Ian Hume	Canada	20.08.1914	Richmond	22.08.1981		
1.52 i	Burl Gist	United States	01.02.1920	Sterling	31.03.1985		
1.52	Burl Gist	United States	01.02.1920	Visalia	04.05.1985		
1.55	Hans Bittner	Germany	22.02.1920	Rome	23.06.1985		
1.55	Burl Gist	United States	01.02.1920	San Diego	29.08.1987		
1.56	Nils-Bertil Nevrup	Sweden	29.11.1926	Kristiansand	28.06.1992		
1.62	James Gillcrist	United States	28.10.1927		31.10.1992		
1.62 i	James Gillcrist	United States	28.10.1927	Providence	16.01.1993		
1.62 i	James Gillcrist	United States	28.10.1927	Bozeman	19.03.1993		
1.63	James Gillcrist	United States	28.10.1927	Naples	17.04.1993		
1.64	James Gillcrist	United States	28.10.1927	Gainesville	25.09.1993		
1.65	Phil Fehlen	United States	03.07.1935	Norwalk	08.07.2000		
1.66	Phil Fehlen	United States	03.07.1935	Eugene	12.08.2000		
1.67	Dušan Prezelj	Slovenia	25.01.1949	İzmir	26.08.2014		
1.68 i	Dušan Prezelj	Slovenia	25.01.1949	Istanbul	22.02.2015		
1.70 i	Oleg Fedorko	Ukraine	31.10.1954	Kyiv	22.12.2019		
1.73 i	Oleg Fedorko	Ukraine	31.10.1954	Kyiv	09.02.2020		
1.68 m	Bruce McBarnette	United States	7 October 1957	65 years, 303 days	Columbia	6 August 2023	
1.68 m	Manfred Ziegler	Germany	19 December 1959	65 years, 163 days	Vohenstrauss	31 May 2025	

== Men 70 ==
Height	Athlete	Nationality	Birthdate	Location	Date
1.47	Winfield McFadden	United States	12.03.1905	Santa Ana	18.06.1977
1.48	Ian Hume	Canada	20.08.1914	Etobicoke	08.11.1984
1.49 i	Nils-Bertil Nevrup	Sweden	29.11.1926	Malmö	12.01.1997
1.50	Nils-Bertil Nevrup	Sweden	29.11.1926	Olofström	11.06.1997
1.52	Bud Held	United States	25.10.1927	Phoenix	08.11.1997
1.51	Gordon Seifert	United States	18.07.1928	Murfreesboro	24.06.2000
1.59	Carl-Erik Särndal	Sweden	17.07.1937	Värnamo	07.08.2007
1.60	Dušan Prezelj	Slovenia	25.01.1949	Ptuj	22.07.2020

== Men 75 ==
Height	Athlete	Nationality	Birthdate	Age	Location	Date
1.40	Kizo Kimura	Japan	11 July 1911	77 years, 19 days	Akita	30 July 1988
1.40 i	Esko Kolhonen	Finland	3 March 1914	75 years, 29 days	Turku	1 April 1989
1.44	Esko Kolhonen	Finland	3 March 1914	75 years, 154 days	Eugene	4 August 1989
1.45 (Note: unofficial meeting (Clermont NTC Spring Fling #2))	Richard Lowery	United States	6 April 1931	75 years, 2 days	Clermont	8 April 2006
1.47	Carl Erik Särndal	Sweden	17 July 1937	75 years, 30 days	Zittau	16 August 2012
1.49	Carl Erik Särndal	Sweden	17 July 1937	76 years, 62 days	Lund	17 September 2013
1.51 i	Carl Erik Särndal	Sweden	17 July 1937	75 years, 180 days	Jönköping	13 January 2013
1.52 i	Carl Erik Särndal	Sweden	17 July 1937	75 years, 187 days	Malmö	20 January 2013
1.53 i	Dušan Prezelj	Slovenia	25 January 1949	75 years, 37 days	Zagreb	2 March 2024

== Men 80 ==
Height	Athlete	Nationality	Birthdate	Location	Date
1.20	Herbert Anderson	United States	15.07.1902	San Diego	29.08.1982
1.21	Gulab Singh	India	13.10.1905	Eugene	04.08.1989
1.22	Virgil McIntyre	United States	20.01.1911	Syracuse	28.06.1991
1.22 i	Wesley Ward	United States	08.02.1910	West Lafayette	15.02.1992
1.22	Virgil McIntyre	United States	20.01.1911		20.06.1992
1.26 i	Esko Kolhonen	Finland	03.03.1914	Turku	19.03.1994
1.27	Esko Kolhonen	Finland	03.03.1914	Athens	11.06.1994
1.31	Esko Kolhonen	Finland	03.03.1914	Kuusankoski	16.07.1994
1.34	Emmerich Zensch	Austria	20.12.1919	Traun	20.05.2000
1.35	Samuli Korpi	Finland	19.08.1929	Tampere	02.07.2010
1.35	Richard Lowery	United States	06.04.1931	Clermont, Florida	21.05.2011
1.37	Richard Lowery	United States	06.04.1931	Houston	17.06.2011
1.38	Carl Erik Särndal	Sweden	17.07.1937	Karlskrona	20.08.2017
1.40 i	Carl Erik Särndal	Sweden	17.07.1937	Malmö	02.03.2019

== Men 85 ==
Height	Athlete	Nationality	Birthdate	Age	Location	Date
1.13	Buell Crane	United States	18 March 1900	85 years, 130 days	Gresham	26 July 1985
1.15	Kizo Kimura	Japan	11 July 1911	85 years, 38 days	Wakayama	18 August 1996
1.18	Kizo Kimura	Japan	11 July 1911	85 years, 65 days	Toyama	14 September 1996
1.20	Kizo Kimura	Japan	11 July 1911	85 years, 346 days	Kofu	22 June 1997
1.20	Esko Kolhonen	Finland	3 March 1914	85 years, 158 days	Gateshead	8 August 1999
1.21	Donald Pellmann	United States	12 August 1915	87 years, 40 days	Hot Springs	21 September 2002
1.22	Emmerich Zensch	Austria	20 December 1919	85 years, 218 days	Edmonton	26 July 2005
1.25	Samuli Korpi	Finland	19 August 1929	85 years, 271 days	Inkeroinen	17 May 2015
1.28	Carl Erik Särndal	Sweden	17 July 1937	85 years, 7 days	Ystad	24 July 2022

== Men 90 ==
Height	Athlete	Nationality	Birthdate	Age	Location	Date	Ref
1.04	Buell Crane	United States	18 March 1900	90 years, 131 days	Gresham	27 July 1990	
1.05	Kizo Kimura	Japan	11 July 1911	90 years, 107 days	Maebashi	26 October 2001	
1.10	Kizo Kimura	Japan	11 July 1911	90 years, 312 days	Matsue	19 May 2002	
1.10	Vic Younger	Australia	5 January 1912	90 years, 276 days	Melbourne	8 October 2002	
1.15	Donald Pellmann	United States	12 August 1915	90 years, 23 days	Fort Collins	4 September 2005	
1.11	Donald Pellmann	United States	12 August 1915	90 years, 53 days	St. George	4 October 2005	
1.12	Brian Greaves	Australia		90	Adelaide	18 April 2025	

== Men 95 ==
Height	Athlete	Nationality	Birthdate	Location	Date
0.86 i	Everett Hosack	United States	28.02.1902	Birmingham	02.03.1997
0.96 i	Leland McPhie	United States	31.03.1914	Landover	22.03.2009
0.98	Leland McPhie	United States	31.03.1914	Oshkosh	11.07.2009
0.99	Donald Pellmann	United States	12.08.1915	Palo Alto	27.03.2011
1.00	Emmerich Zensch	Austria	20.12.1919	Lyon France	14.08.2015

== Men 100 ==
Height	Athlete	Nationality	Birthdate	Age	Location	Date	Ref
0.90	Donald Pellmann	United States	12 August 1915	100 years, 39 days	San Diego	20 September 2015	
