= Coco Crisp =

American baseball player (born 1979)

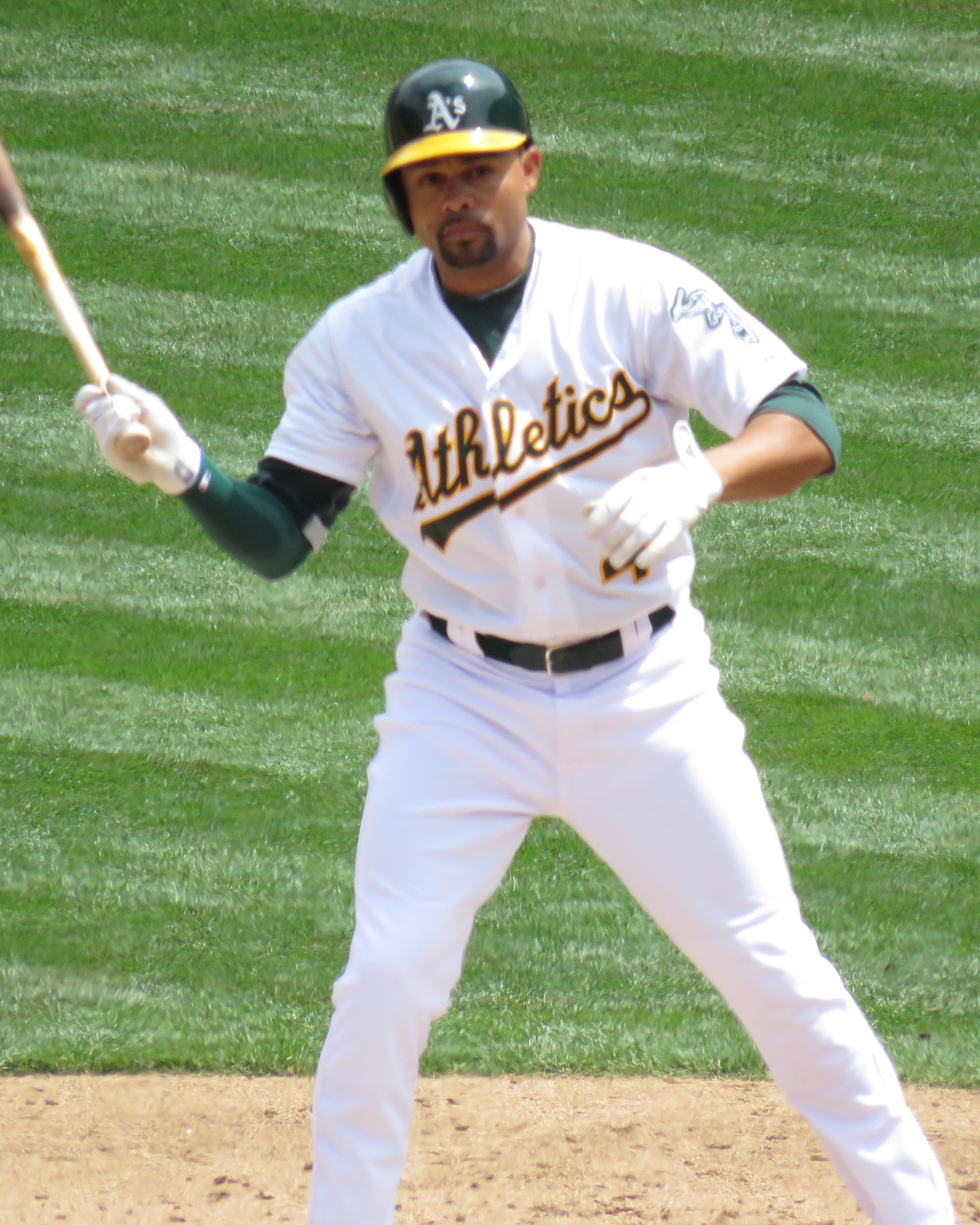
- Crisp with the Oakland Athletics in 2015
- Outfielder
- Born: November 1, 1979 (age 47); Los Angeles, California, U.S.
- Batted: Switch Threw: Right

MLB debut
- August 15, 2002, for the Cleveland Indians

Last MLB appearance
- October 2, 2016, for the Cleveland Indians

MLB statistics
- Batting average: .265
- Home runs: 130
- Runs batted in: 639
- Stolen bases: 309
- Stats at Baseball Reference

Teams
- Cleveland Indians (2002–2005); Boston Red Sox (2006–2008); Kansas City Royals (2009); Oakland Athletics (2010–2016); Cleveland Indians (2016)

Career highlights and awards
- World Series champion (2007); AL stolen base leader (2011)

Covelli Loyce "Coco" Crisp (born November 1, 1979) is an American former professional baseball outfielder and MiLB team manager. He played in Major League Baseball (MLB) for the Cleveland Indians, Boston Red Sox, Kansas City Royals, and Oakland Athletics. While primarily a center fielder throughout his career, Crisp also played left field for the Athletics and during his stints with the Indians. With the Red Sox, he won the 2007 World Series over the Colorado Rockies. He served as manager of the Mahoning Valley Scrappers of the MLB Draft League in 2021.

== Early life ==
Crisp was born in Los Angeles on November 1, 1979. He is the son of Loyce Crisp, a fast food restaurant owner and former amateur boxer, and Pamela Crisp, a former champion sprinter. He graduated from Inglewood High School in Inglewood, California before playing one season at Los Angeles Pierce College. Crisp is a graduate of Major League Baseball's Reviving Baseball in Inner Cities Program. His maternal grandfather is Nick Newton, a masters high jump world record holder from 1994 to 1996 and inventor of cast aluminum starting blocks. He played on the 1995 Senior Division RBI World Series champions from Los Angeles.

=== Nickname ===
Crisp was originally nicknamed "Coco" by his sister who teased him that he looked like one of the characters on the Cocoa Krispies cereal box. The nickname was short-lived, until he started playing AA baseball when the team had all the players fill out a questionnaire to get to know one another. Covelli listed "Coco" as his nickname on the form and his teammates thought the name was funny so they had it put on the scoreboard during the game. He was traded to another team after a week and a half, but the nickname stuck and he has been "Coco Crisp" ever since. He officially changed his name on March 5, 2013.

== Minor league career ==
The St. Louis Cardinals selected Crisp in the seventh round of the 1999 MLB draft. In his minor league career, Crisp played for Cardinals Minor League Baseball affiliates in four different leagues from 1999 to 2001 and was the Cardinals 2001 Minor League Player of the Year. He opened the 2002 season with the New Haven Ravens, then the Double-A Eastern League affiliate of the Cardinals. Crisp was traded to the Cleveland Indians on August 7, 2002, to complete an earlier trade for pitcher Chuck Finley. In the Indians organization, he played for their Double-A affiliate, the Akron Aeros, and their Triple-A affiliate, the Buffalo Bisons. Crisp had 69 hits, one home run, and 24 runs batted in (RBIs) before being called up by the Indians.

== Major league career ==
=== Cleveland Indians ===
Crisp became the starting center fielder with the Indians in mid-2002, replacing the injured Matt Lawton. For the next few seasons, Crisp established a reputation as an excellent fielder and speedy baserunner. Despite his success, Crisp had to fight for his roster spot each spring. In 2005, Crisp moved to left field following the emergence of another young outfielder, Grady Sizemore. In his final two seasons with the Indians, Crisp showcased his offensive talent by batting .297 and .300 with 31 total home runs and 35 steals.

=== Boston Red Sox ===
After Johnny Damon signed with the New York Yankees, the Red Sox sought Crisp to fill Damon's role as both leadoff hitter and in center field. In January 2006, the Red Sox sent prospect third baseman Andy Marte, pitcher Guillermo Mota, catcher Kelly Shoppach, a player to be named later (minor leaguer Randy Newsom), and cash considerations to the Indians for Crisp, catcher Josh Bard and pitcher David Riske.

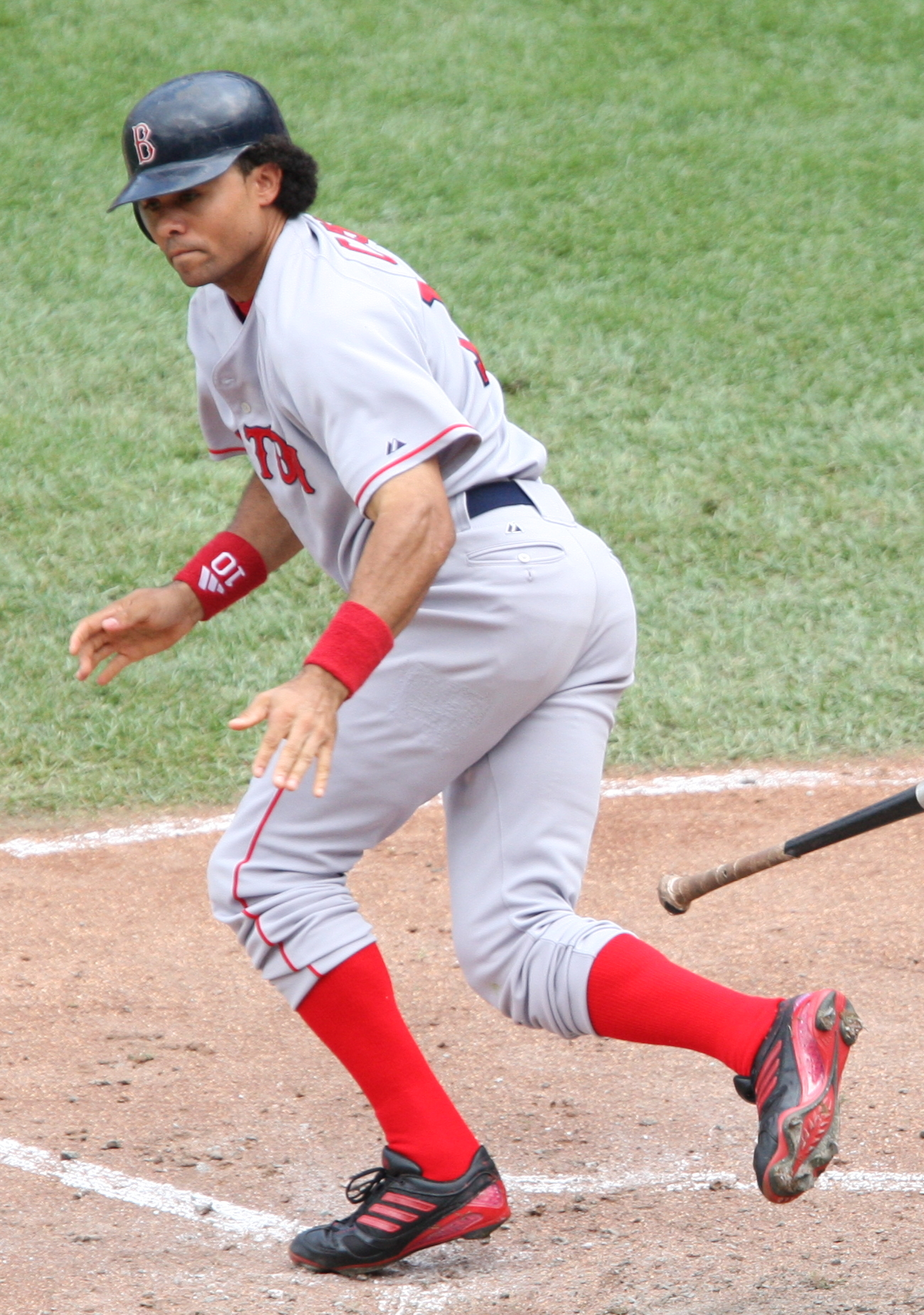
Crisp playing for the Boston Red Sox in 2007.

On April 12, 2006, Crisp signed a three-year contract extension with the Red Sox worth $15.5 million. Crisp broke his left index finger attempting to steal third base earlier in the month and spent the next 42 games on the disabled list. After returning to the Red Sox outfield on May 28, Kevin Youkilis had taken over the leadoff spot, and Crisp usually batted seventh or eighth in the line-up for the rest of the year. In 105 games, he had a .264 batting average with eight home runs and 36 RBI. Besides his injury, Crisp's 2006 season may be best remembered for a catch against the New York Mets on June 29.

==== 2007 season ====
Crisp began the 2007 season struggling offensively due to lingering effects of off season surgery to his left index finger. On April 20, 2007, Crisp fell over a short wall at Fenway Park while trying to catch a home run by Alex Rodriguez. Although he was unable to make the catch, missing by inches, he hit a game-tying triple off Mariano Rivera in the bottom of the eighth, then scored the go-ahead run on Alex Cora's soft line drive single. The Red Sox went on to win 7–6. During this season, he made numerous impressive catches in the outfield. It has even been claimed by one major league club that Crisp is easily the best defensive center fielder in all of Major League Baseball. Although he struggled at the plate throughout much of the season, between June 13 and July 23, Crisp raised his batting average from .221 to .284, a .402 average during that span. On June 18, entering the game with only two home runs in the season, Crisp belted two homers in the first multi-HR game of his career in a 9–4 loss to the Atlanta Braves.

On August 5, Crisp was almost run over by the Seattle Mariners' mascot, the Mariner Moose. The Moose, driving a lap around Safeco Field's warning track on an ATV, nearly collided with Crisp as he was leaving the dugout for his position in the middle of the fifth inning; Crisp had to jump out of the way to avoid being hit. Red Sox pitching coach John Farrell was incensed by the mascot's actions and voiced his displeasure to both the mascot and Seattle's head groundskeeper. Immediately following the incident, the Red Sox received an apology from Mariners GM Bill Bavasi.

On October 21, in Game 7 of the American League Championship Series, Crisp made the catch that sent Boston to their second World Series in four seasons. He hit the wall shortly after making the catch, slightly injuring himself in the process. Despite this, he was well enough to play in the World Series.

Although he was the team's starting center fielder throughout the 2007 season, he was benched mid-series during the ALCS for rookie Jacoby Ellsbury. He remained benched for the 2007 World Series, only appearing late in games for defensive substitutions.

==== 2008 season ====
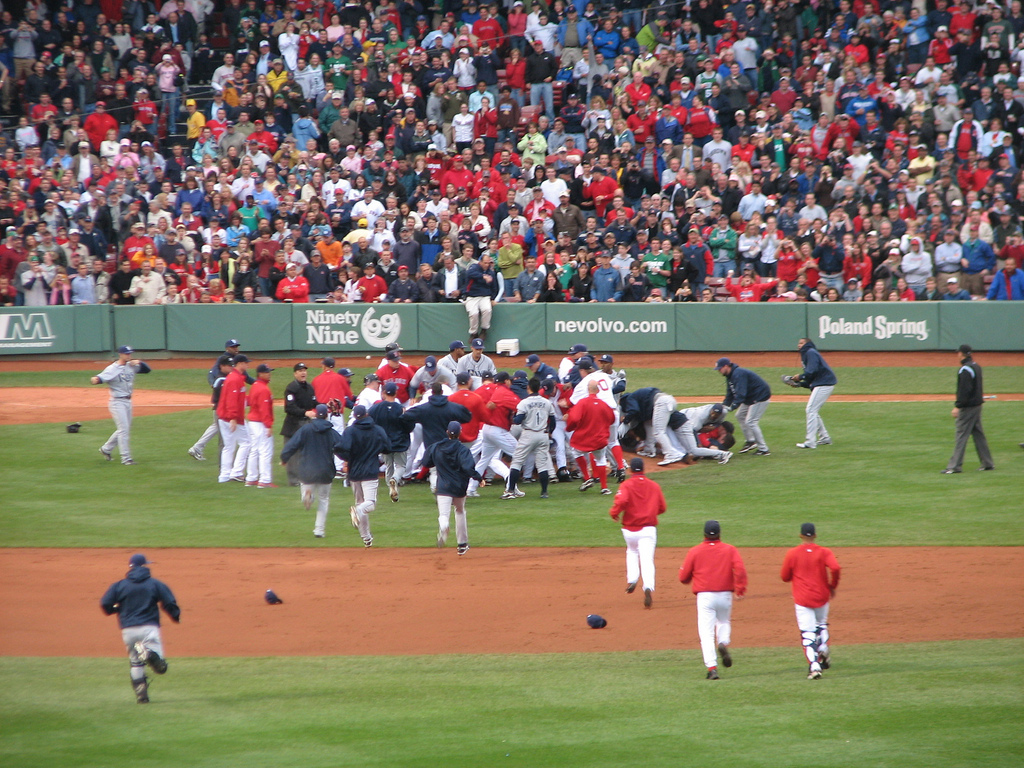
Bench-clearing brawl on June 5, 2008.

On June 4, Crisp was the center of controversy in a game against the Tampa Bay Rays. While Crisp was trying to steal second base in the bottom of the sixth inning, Rays shortstop Jason Bartlett purposely placed his knee in front of the bag in an attempt to prevent Crisp from stealing the base. Crisp stole the base, but was not happy with this. On base again in the bottom of the eighth inning, he attempted another steal, this time taking out second baseman Akinori Iwamura on a hard slide. His slide was controversial and catalyzed the "payback pitch" the following game. During a pitching change in that inning, Rays manager Joe Maddon and Crisp argued, with Crisp in the dugout and Maddon on the pitching mound. After the game, Crisp said that he thought Bartlett would cover the bag, instead he (Bartlett) chose to tell Iwamura to take the throw in the eighth inning. Crisp described Bartlett's knee in front of the bag as a "Dirty" play. During the next game, with Crisp at bat in the bottom of the second inning, and the Sox up 3–1, Rays starter James Shields hit him on the thigh on the second pitch. Crisp charged the mound and first dodged a punch from Shields, and then threw a glancing punch at Shields, which set off a bench-clearing brawl. Crisp, Jonny Gomes, and Shields were ejected from the game. Major League Baseball suspended Crisp for seven games due to his actions in the brawl. Upon appeal, the suspension was reduced to five games, which he had served as of June 28, 2008. In Game 5 of the ALCS, Crisp had a game-tying hit in the bottom of the eighth inning to cap Boston's seven-run comeback. Boston would go on to win the game 8–7 with a walk-off single in the ninth inning by J. D. Drew, but eventually lost the series in seven games.

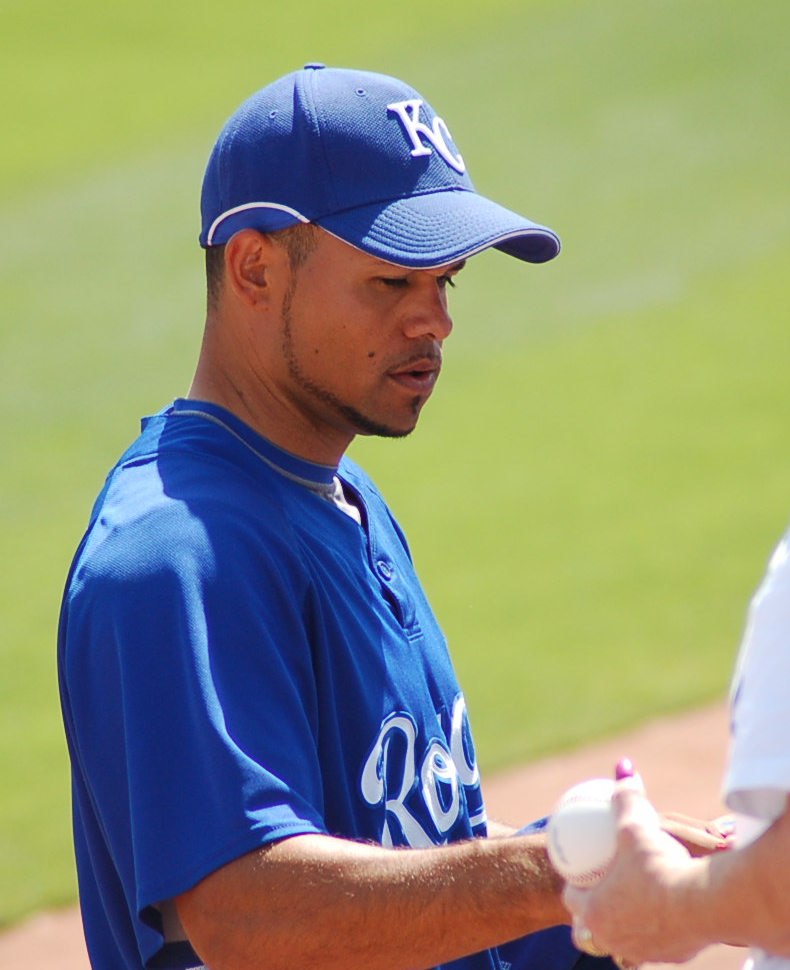
Crisp with the Kansas City Royals in 2009 spring training.

=== Kansas City Royals ===
On November 19, 2008, Crisp was traded to the Kansas City Royals for relief pitcher Ramón Ramírez.

During his lone season with the Royals, Crisp started off hot, hitting well over .300 before his batting average fell to a career low .228 due to shoulder injuries. On June 23, 2009, Royals manager Trey Hillman announced that Crisp would receive season ending surgeries to repair a labrum tear in both shoulders.

=== Oakland Athletics ===
After the 2009 season, Crisp signed a one-year contract with the Oakland Athletics worth $5 million, with a club option for 2011. Crisp began the 2010 season on the 15-day DL with a fractured left pinkie finger.

Crisp entered the 2011 season exercising his one-year option with the Oakland Athletics. On August 24, Crisp homered from both sides of the plate against the New York Yankees. In that game, he hit a game-winning three-run home run in the top of the 10th inning on the first pitch he saw against reliever Rafael Soriano. He finished the season with an AL-leading 49 stolen bases.

Crisp re-signed with Athletics on January 3, 2012, on a two-year, $14 million deal with a club option for 2014. Crisp had received other offers from clubs such as the Baltimore Orioles and Chicago White Sox as well, but declined them both.

On October 10, 2012, in Game 4 of the 2012 American League Division Series against the Detroit Tigers, Crisp came to bat in the bottom of the ninth inning. The score was tied 3–3, there were two outs and a runner on second base (Seth Smith). The A's were down 3–1 entering the inning, but subsequently tied the game with three straight hits off Detroit pitcher José Valverde, thus setting the stage for Crisp. He came through with a walk-off single to right field that scored Smith, giving the A's a 4–3 win and forcing a decisive Game 5. On October 11, 2012, the Tigers finished off the series with a 6–0 victory over the A's.

After the 2013 season, the Athletics exercised their club option on Crisp for the 2014 season. Before the 2014 season, Crisp signed an extension with the Athletics covering the 2015 and 2016 seasons. The contract guaranteed him $11 million in each of the 2015 and 2016 seasons, and had a vesting option for the 2017 season. Crisp's playing time was reduced in 2016, leading him to believe that the Athletics were intentionally preventing his 2017 option from vesting.

In 2015, he batted a career-low .175 and had the lowest on-base percentage (.252) and slugging percentage (.222) of his career, as on defense he played exclusively in left field.

=== Return to Cleveland ===
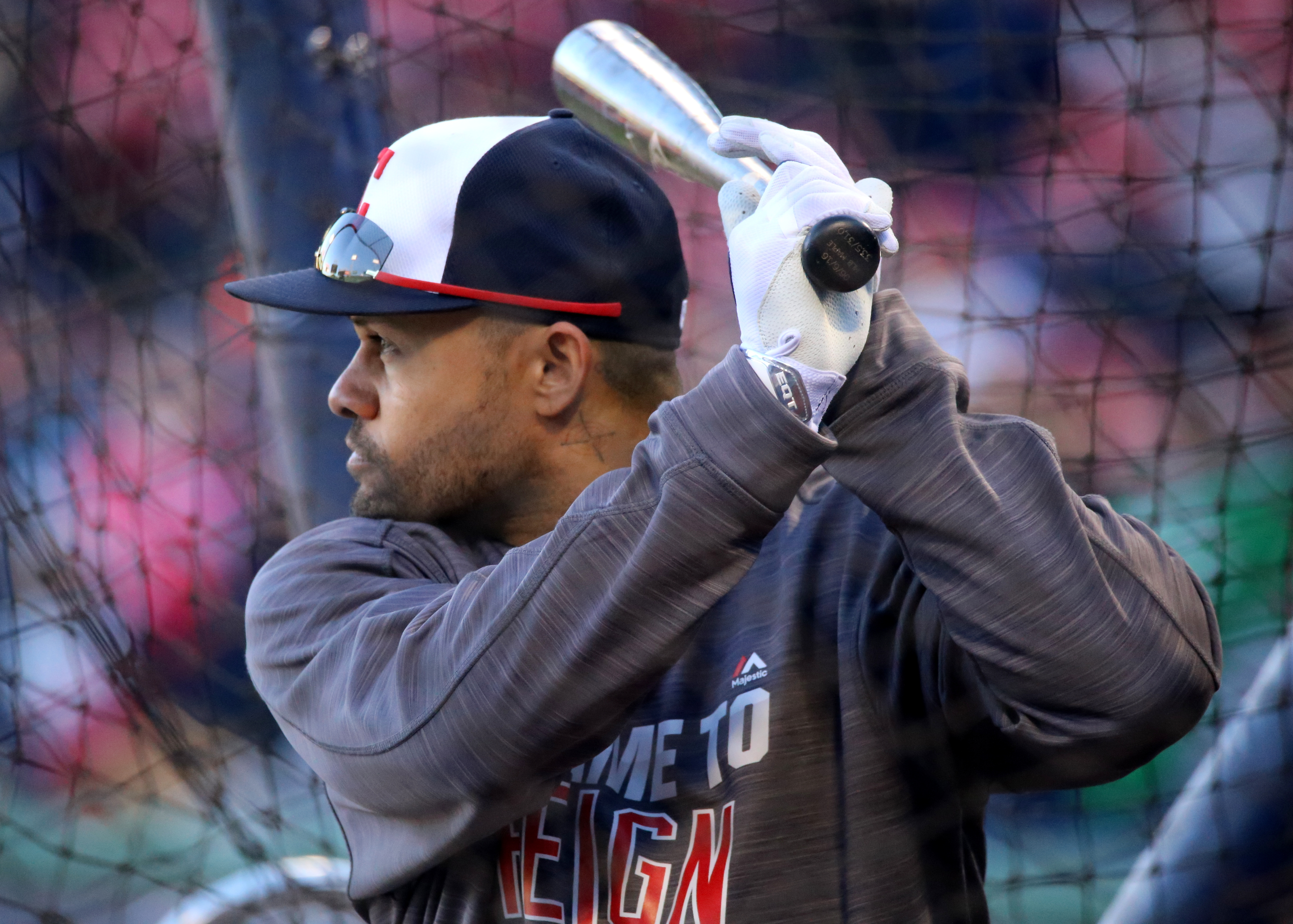
Crisp taking batting practice before game three of the 2016 American League Division Series

On August 31, 2016, the Athletics traded Crisp with cash considerations to the Indians for Colt Hynes. Before he agreed to waive his no-trade clause, Chris Antonetti, the Indians' general manager, spoke with Crisp to tell him that he would not receive enough playing time in Cleveland for his option to vest. In 2016, he batted .208 for Cleveland.

On October 10, 2016, against the Boston Red Sox in Game 3 of the ALDS, Crisp hit a go-ahead two-run home run, which would eventually be the game-winner after the Indians won 4–3. The Indians' win propelled them to the ALCS against the Toronto Blue Jays. It was Crisp's second career postseason home run. However, he and the Indians could not hold on in the World Series, losing the series in seven games to the Chicago Cubs.

== Post-playing career ==
Crisp became a free agent following the 2016 season after he failed to meet the contractual incentives that would have caused his vesting option for 2017 to trigger. In July 2017, Crisp became the head coach of the Shadow Hills High School baseball team. In June 2019, Crisp resigned as head coach after two years due to him and his family moving.

In February 2019, it was announced that Crisp would be joining the Oakland Athletics Radio Network as a part-time color analyst, working alongside Ken Korach and Vince Cotroneo in the booth for 33 games in the 2019 season. In 2020, Crisp became the bench coach for the Cerritos College baseball team.

On April 12, 2021, Crisp was announced as the manager of the Mahoning Valley Scrappers for the inaugural season of the MLB Draft League. On January 17, 2022, Crisp was hired by the Washington Nationals organization as part of the team's player development staff.

== Playing style ==
Crisp was known for having great range in center field, but also for having a below average throwing arm. At the height of his career, Crisp was considered one of the best base-stealers in the game and a generally aggressive baserunner. He owns the Athletics franchise record for most consecutive stolen bases without being caught. He was known to be a good "small-ball" type player because of his good bunting skills but also had respectable power. Crisp had also only been hit by a pitch five times in his fifteen-year career.

== Personal life ==
Crisp is of Italian, African-American and Puerto Rican descent. His father is of Puerto Rican and Italian descent and his mother is African American. He is separated and has four children: three sons and a daughter. He and his family used to live in Rancho Mirage, California but now they all live in the Calabasas area.
