= 1949 USA Outdoor Track and Field Championships =

American athletics championship event

- Dates: 24–25 June (men); 12-13 August (women)
- Host city: Fresno, California (men); Odessa, Texas (women)
- Venue: Ratcliffe Stadium (men); Broncho Stadium (women)
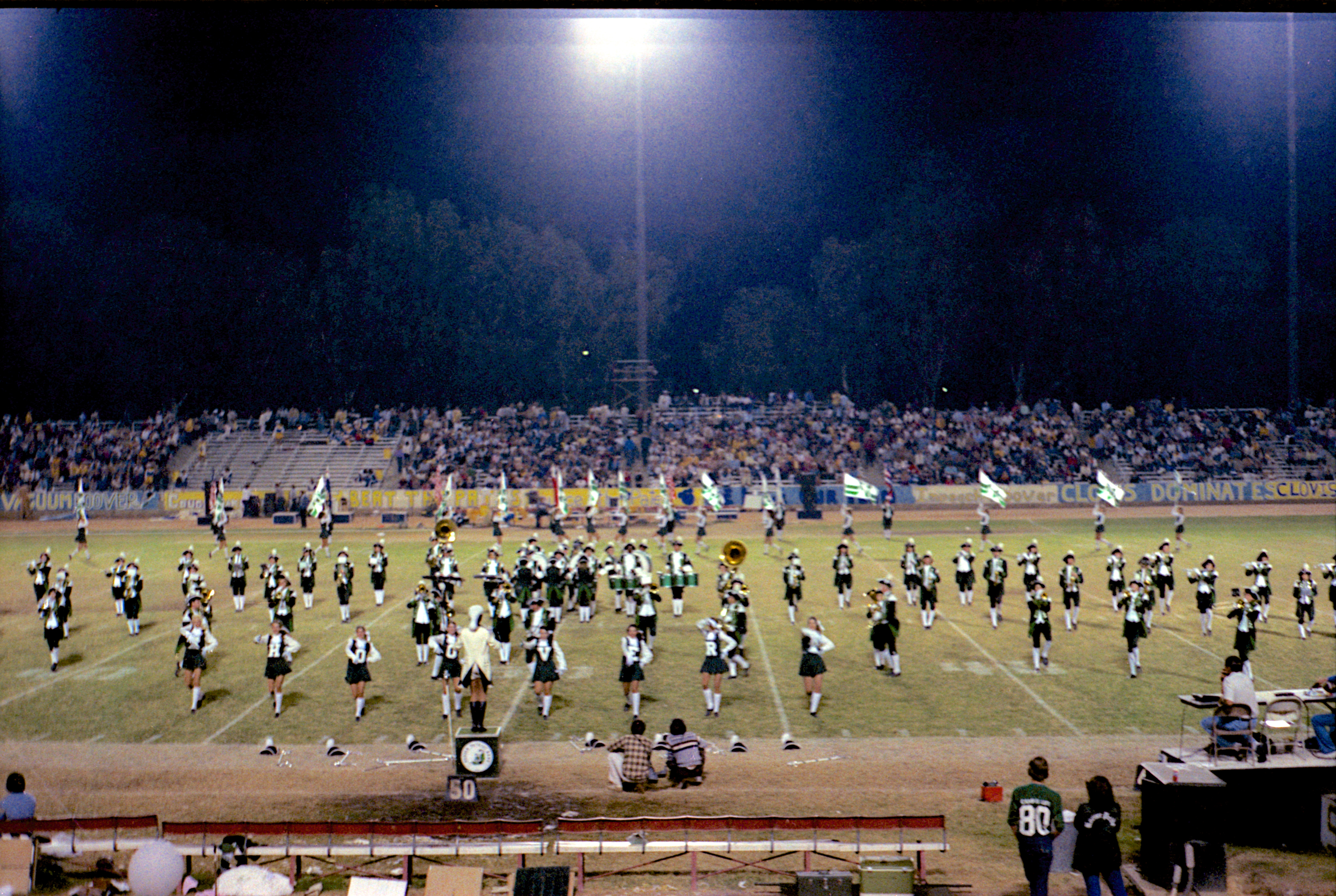

The 1949 USA Outdoor Track and Field Championships were organized by the Amateur Athletic Union (AAU) and served as the national championships in outdoor track and field for the United States.

The men's edition was held at Ratcliffe Stadium in Fresno, California, and it took place 24–25 June. The women's meet was held separately at Broncho Stadium in Odessa, Texas, on 12-13 August.

At the men's championships, about 8,000 spectators attended. In the women's competition, Nell Jackson broke Stella Walsh's seven-year win streak in the 200 m. The women's meet was sponsored by the Odessa Shriners club.

== Results ==
=== Men ===
Event	Gold		Silver		Bronze	
100 m	Andrew Stanfield	10.3	Robert Work	10.4	Charles Peters	10.4
200 m straight	Andrew Stanfield	20.4 w	Charles Peters	20.9 w	Donald Campbell	20.9 w
400 m	George Rhoden (JAM)	46.4	Herbert McKenley (JAM)	46.7	Hugo Maiocco	47.5
800 m	Malvin Whitfield	1:50.5	Herbert Barten	1:51.2e	Pat Bowers	1:51.9e
1500 m	John Twomey	3:52.6	Bob Karnes	3:53.3	Bill McGuire	3:53.6
5000 m	Fred Wilt	14:49.3	Horace Ashenfelter	14:56.0	Robert Black	15:19.5
10000 m	Fred Wilt	31:05.7	Robert Black	32:28.4	Thomas Quinn	32:42.0
Marathon	Victor Dyrgall	2:38:48.9	John A. Kelley	2:39.30	Louis White	2:40.47
110 m hurdles	Craig Dixon	13.8	Harrison Dillard	13.8	Richard Attlesey	14.0
200 m hurdles straight	Craig Dixon	22.6				
400 m hurdles	Charley Moore	51.1	Dick Ault	51.9	Ronald Frazier	52.5
3000 m steeplechase	Curt Stone	9:31.0	Forrest Efaw	9:33.2	Browning Ross	9:35.5
3000 m walk	Henry Laskau	13:34.0				
High jump	Richard Phillips	1.99 m	Jack Heintzman	1.96 m	David Albritton	1.94 m
High jump	Richard Phillips	1.99 m	Jack Heintzman	1.96 m	Irving Mondschein	1.94 m
Pole vault	Bob Richards	4.37 m	George Rasmussen	4.27 m	Donald Laz	4.11 m
Pole vault	Bob Richards	4.37 m	George Rasmussen	4.27 m	Tom Bennett	4.11 m
Pole vault	Bob Richards	4.37 m	George Rasmussen	4.27 m	John Montgomery	4.11 m
Pole vault	Bob Richards	4.37 m	George Rasmussen	4.27 m	Bobby Smith	4.11 m
Long jump	Gaylord Bryan	7.66 m	Herb Douglas	7.59 m	Henry Aihara	7.52 m
Triple jump	Gaylord Bryan	14.96 m	Erkki Koutonen	14.61 m	Dick Lyster	14.26 m
Shot put	James Fuchs	17.43 m	Stan Lampert	16.32 m	Wilbur Thompson	16.24 m
Discus throw	Fortune Gordien	53.17 m	Victor Frank	50.70 m	Jack Donaldson	50.39 m
Hammer throw	Samuel Felton	53.90 m	Henry Dreyer	53.50 m	Tom Montgomery	47.62 m
Javelin throw	Bud Held	70.78 m	Martin Biles	70.10 m	Delfs Pickarts	67.25 m
Weight throw for distance	Henry Dreyer	38 ft 4 3/4 in (11.7 m)				
Pentathlon	Wilbur Ross	3429 pts				
Decathlon	Robert Mathias	7556 pts	Irving Mondschein	7044 pts	Bill Albans	6715 pts

=== Women ===
Event	Gold		Silver	Bronze
50 m	Juanita Watson	6.5	Jean Patton	Dolores Dwyer
100 m	Jean Patton	12.1	Audrey Patterson	Dorothy Jacobs
200 m	Nell Jackson	24.2	Stanislawa Walasiewicz (POL)	Audrey Patterson
80 m hurdles	Bernice Robinson	11.9	Theresa Manuel	Mildred Martin
High jump	Gertrude Orr	1.52 m	Bernice Robinson	Evelyn Lawler
Long jump	Mabel Landry	5.31 m	Bernice Robinson	Stanislawa Walasiewicz (POL)
Shot put	Juanita Watson	12.09 m	Francis Kaszubski (POL)	Dorothy Dodson
Discus throw	Francis Kaszubski (POL)	37.72 m	Herta Rand	Concepcion Villaneuva (MEX)
Javelin throw	Dorothy Dodson		Herta Rand	Maria Julia Perez (CUB)
Baseball throw	Juanita Watson	233 ft 8 in (71.22 m)		

== See also ==
- List of USA Outdoor Track and Field Championships winners (men)
- List of USA Outdoor Track and Field Championships winners (women)
