= 1948 USA Outdoor Track and Field Championships =

American athletics championship event

- Dates: 2–3 July (men); 6 July (women)
- Host city: Milwaukee, Wisconsin (men); Grand Rapids, Michigan (women)
- Venue: Marquette Stadium (men); Houseman Field (women)
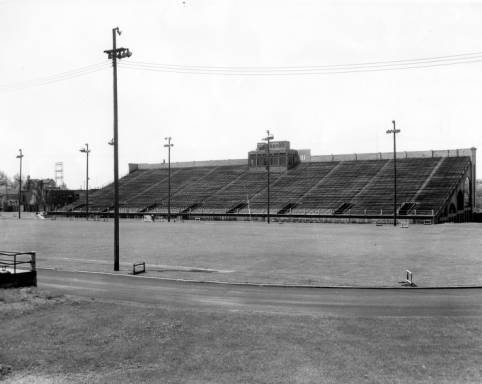

The 1948 USA Outdoor Track and Field Championships were organized by the Amateur Athletic Union (AAU) and served as the national championships in outdoor track and field for the United States.

The men's edition was held at Marquette Stadium in Milwaukee, Wisconsin, and it took place 2–3 July. The women's meet was held separately at Houseman Field in Grand Rapids, Michigan, on 6 July.

Both championships were held about one week before their respective 1948 United States Olympic trials, except for the men's 10,000 m which served as both the national championships and Olympic team selection event. At the men's edition, Herb McKenley set a men's 400 m world record in the heats. It was the first year that a separate Olympic trials was held for women.

== Results ==
=== Men ===
Event	Gold		Silver		Bronze	
100 m	Norwood Ewell	10.6	Harrison Dillard		Paul Bienz	
200 m	Lloyd LaBeach	21.0	Cliff Bourland		Norwood Ewell	
400 m	Herbert McKenley (JAM)	46.3	Malvin Whitfield		Ollie Matson	
800 m	Herbert Barten	1:51.3	Reginald Pearman		Tarver Perkins	
1500 m	Gilbert Dodds	3:52.1	Roland Sink		William Mack	
5000 m	Curt Stone	14:49.1	Jerry Thompson		Clarence Robison	
10000 m	Edward O'Toole	32:29.7	Fred Wilt	32:31.0	Herman Goffberg	33:10.0
Marathon	John A. Kelley	2:48:32.3	Charles Robbins	2:59.19	Harry Murphy	3:01.05
110 m hurdles	William Porter	14.1	Harrison Dillard	14.3	Edward Dugger	
200 m hurdles	Madill Gartiser	23.9				
400 m hurdles	Roy Cochran	52.3	Ennis Gray		Clarence Doak	
3000 m steeplechase	Forrest Efaw	9:32.9	Robert McMullen		Browning Ross	
3000 m walk	Henry Laskau	13:17.9				
High jump	William Vessie	2.02 m	none awarded		John Vislocky	2.00 m
High jump	Tom Schofield	2.02 m	none awarded		Richard Phillips	2.00 m
High jump	Tom Schofield	2.02 m	none awarded		Vern McGrew	2.00 m
Pole vault	Richmond Morcom	4.42 m	none awarded		Guinn Smith	4.34 m
Pole vault	Bob Richards	4.42 m	none awarded		Guinn Smith	4.34 m
Long jump	Fred Johnson	7.73 m	Lorenzo Wright	7.68 m	Eural Davis	7.43 m
Triple jump	Gaylord Bryan	14.62 m	Bill Albans	14.29 m	James Gerhardt	14.25 m
Shot put	James Delaney	16.36 m	Bernard Mayer	16.22 m	Wilbur Thompson	16.15 m
Discus throw	Fortune Gordien	51.33 m	Byrl Thompson	50.53 m	Victor Frank	49.32 m
Hammer throw	Robert Bennett	53.52 m	Samuel Felton	52.78 m	Henry Dreyer	51.93 m
Javelin throw	Steve Seymour	70.23 m	Martin Biles	66.85 m	Delfs Pickarts	61.96 m
Weight throw for distance	Henry Dreyer	41 ft 2 1/2 in (12.56 m) (Note: A lighter-than-normal implement was used.)				
Pentathlon	Russell Thomas	3283 pts				
Decathlon	Robert Mathias	7224 pts	Irving Mondschein	7101 pts	Floyd Simmons	7054 pts

=== Women ===
Event	Gold		Silver	Bronze
50 m	Mabel Walker	6.7	Alice Coachman	Mary Hardaway
100 m	Stanislawa Walasiewicz (POL)	12.9	Mary Griggs	Juanita Watson
200 m	Stanislawa Walasiewicz (POL)	25.5	Audrey Patterson	Nell Jackson
80 m hurdles	Bernice Robinson	12.1	Lillie Purifoy	Theresa Manuel
High jump	Alice Coachman	1.52 m	Emma Reed	none awarded
High jump	Alice Coachman	1.52 m	Bernice Robinson	none awarded
Long jump	Stanislawa Walasiewicz (POL)	5.40 m	Lillian Young	Nancy Phillips
Shot put (8 lb)	Francis Kaszubski (POL)	12.34 m	Dorothy Dodson	Pauline Ruppeldt
Discus throw	Francis Kaszubski (POL)	37.88 m	Dorothy Dodson	Herta Rand
Javelin throw	Dorothy Dodson	38.37 m	Theresa Manuel	Bessie Leick
Baseball throw	Juanita Watson	218 ft 6 in (66.59 m)		

== See also ==
- List of USA Outdoor Track and Field Championships winners (men)
- List of USA Outdoor Track and Field Championships winners (women)
