= Masters M60 high jump world record progression =

This is the progression of world record improvements of the high jump M60 division of Masters athletics.

Key

Incomplete information Pending

Height	Athlete	Nationality	Birthdate	Location	Date
1.81	Vladimir Kuntsevich	Russia	06.08.1952	Zittau	16.08.2012
1.80	Thomas Zacharias	Germany	02.01.1947	Arrecife	27.04.2007
1.76	Asko Pesonen	Finland	15.04.1943	Leppavirta	14.09.2003
1.72	Phil Fehlen	United States	03.07.1935	Saskatoon	04.07.1998
1.70	Horst Mandl	Austria	08.01.1936	Malmö	21.07.1996
1.69	Milton Newton	United States	06.11.1933	Los Angeles	10.06.1995
1.68	James Gillcrist	United States	28.10.1927		19.09.1992
1.66	Richard "Boo" Morcom	United States	01.05.1921	Lincoln	1982
1.60	Hans Overland	Norway	03.08.1924	Brighton	22.08.1984
