= Masters M45 high jump world record progression =

This is the progression of world record improvements of the high jump M45 division of Masters athletics.

Key

Incomplete information Pending

Height	Athlete	Nationality	Birthdate	Location	Date
2.05	Charles Austin	United States	19.12.1967	San Marcos	21.06.2013
2.04	Marco Segatel	Italy	23.03.1962	Cernusco	19.07.2007
2.04 i	Dennis Lewis	United States	20.03.1959	Ypsilanti	11.02.2006
2.00	Asko Pesonen	Finland	15.04.1943	Iisalmi	03.09.1988
1.90	Herm Wyatt	United States	13.09.1931	Los Angeles	19.04.1980
1.78	Ed Austin	United States			
