= USATF Masters Hall of Fame =

- Established: 1996
- Type: Professional sports hall of fame; museum
- Website: www.usatf.org/programs/masters/awards/masters-hall-of-fame

The USATF Masters Hall of Fame is the Masters section of the National Track and Field Hall of Fame. It is intended to select worthy athletes from the various divisions of Masters athletics involved in the sports of track and field, road running and race walking. They are selected from nominees proposed by the Hall of Fame Committee, a joint committee under the supervision of the Masters Track and Field (MTF) and Masters Long Distance Running (LDR) committees of USATF, the current national governing body supervising the sport in the United States. First Class was 1996. Voters include the members of the Hall of Fame committee, the Executive Boards of the MTF and LDR and the members of the Hall of Fame itself.

Name	Induction Year
Louise Adams	2001
Jerry Bookin-Weiner	2021
Don Isett	2021
Michael Brown	2021
Kay Glynn	2021
John Goldhammer	2021
Rachel Guest	2021
Lesley Hinz	2021
Bill Murray	2022
Harvey Lewellen	2022
Derek Pye	2022
Robert Thomas, Jr.	2022
Doug Torbert	2022
David Bickel	2023
LaTrica Dendy	2023
Tim Edwards	2023
Sue McDonald	2023
Emmanuelle McGowan	2023
Antonio Palacios	2023
Mark Cleary	2024
Antwon Dussett	2024
Sonja Friend-Uhl	2024
Philip Greenwald	2024
Brian Hankerson	2024
Monica Kendall	2024
William Platts	2024
Daniel Aldrich	2010
John Alexander	2020
Charles Allie	2005
Bill Andberg	2000
Herb Anderson	1998
Ruth Anderson	1996
Carmen Ayala-Troncoso	2012
Paul Babits	2018
Ken Baker	2013
Thane Baker	1999
Rae Baymiller	2014
Ginette Bedard	2014
Doug Bell	2014
Ed Benham	1997
Bill Benson	2016
Kathy Bergen	2008
Margret Betz	2014
Vicki Bigelow	2005
Ernie Billups	2000
Laurie Binder	2014
Bob Boal	1998
Konrad Boas	2003
Jeanne Bocci	2006
Mary Bowermaster	1999
George Braceland	2001
Fay Bradley	2003
Norm Bright	2000
Bill Brobson	2002
Barry Brown	2014
Gloria Brown	2005
Harry Brown	2003
Ty Brown	2018
Avery Bryant	2006
Dan Bulkley	1999
Walt Butler	2014
Phil Byrne	2012
Carolyn Cappetta	2000
Ross Carter	1998
Jaclyn Caselli	2003
Harold Chapson	1998
William Clark	2017
Polly Clarke	1998
Anne Clarke	2000
Bill Collins	2003
George Cohen	2009
Linda Cohn	2020
Larry Colbert	2002
Phil Conley	2004
Dan Conway	2007
Ted Corbitt	1999
Buell Crane	2002
Jerry Crockett	2009
Lisa Daley	2019
Jeanne Daprano	2003
William Daprano	2009
Gerry Davidson	2003
Clive Davies	1998
Bud Deacon	2001
Burt DeGroot	2006
Don DeNoon	2004
Colleen DeReuck	2014
Toshiko D'Elia	1996
Helen Dick	2014
Sharon Dolan	2014
Christel Donley	1997
Jerry Donley	1999
Stan Druckrey	2001
Tim Dyas	2009
Ruth Eberle	2003
Ray Feick	2009
Joe Fernandez	2015
Barbara Filutze	2005
Bob Fine	2002
Frank Finger	2006
Carol Finsrud	2007
Bill Fitzgerald	2000
Greg Foster	2013
Alfred Funk	2007
Tom Gage	2001
Willie Gault	2019
Burl Gist	2001
Doug Goodhue	2015
Miriam Gordon	2006
Miki Gorman	1996
Horace Grant	2016
Courtland P. Gray III	2006
Max Green	1998
Norman Green	1996
Jack Greenwood	1997
Joanne Grissom	1999
Alfred Guidet	2007
Rita Hanscom	2012
Mary Harada	2009
John Hartfield	2020
Rex Harvey	2000
Alisa Harvey	2019
Sabra Harvey	2019
Ray Hatton	2001
Dudley Healy	2003
Mike Heffernan	2004
Franklin (Bud) Held	2005
Renee Henderson	2016
Robert Hewitt	2014
Hal Higdon	1999
Vanessa Hilliard	2001
Claude Hills	1999
Margaret Hinton	2003
Bernice Robinson Holland	2001
Jan Holmquist	2015
Everett Hosack	2002
Richard Hotchkiss	2018
Sid Howard	2005
Robert Hunt	2004
Marion Irvine	1998
Dave Jackson	2002
Bess James	2020
Betty Jarvis	2004
Carol Johnston	2003
Gayle Johnson	2007
Barbara Jordan	2005
Payton Jordan	1996
John Keston	2001
Sandra Kiddy	2002
Joe King	2008
Shirley J. Kinsey	2006
Helen Klein	1999
Gloria Krug	2017
Magdalena Kuehne	2013
Dale Lance	2004
Tom Langenfeld	2008
Mel Larsen	2000
Audrey Lary	2008
Bev LaVeck	1996
Jim Law	2001
Anselm LeBourne	2014
Stephen Lester	2014
Bob Lida	2009
Gunnar Linde	2019
Ed Lukens	2000
Hedy Marque	2012
Jim Mathis	2006
Kathy Martin	2012
Shirley Matson	1998
Bob Matteson	2009
Lori Maynard	2005
Bruce McBarnette	2009
Leonore McDaniels	2000
Doug MacGregor	2014
Terry Mahr	2014
Tom McDermott	2002
Marianne Martino	2018
Winfield McFadden	2005
John McManus	2012
Pearl Mehl	1999
Edith Mendyka	1999
Meryl Mensey	2014
Archie Messenger	2001
Marie-Louise Michelsohn	2008
Barbara Miller	2007
Charley Miller	2009
Gary Miller	1999
Margaret Miller	2014
Bob Mimm	1998
Marilyn J. Mitchell	2006
Bill Morales	2008
Boo Morcom	1997
Bert Morrow	2009
Phil Mulkey	2000
Tim Muller	2019
Pete Mundle	1998
Tim Murphy	2005
Jack Nelson	2014
Austin Newman	2007
Nick Newton	2004
Harold Nolan	2017
Irene Obera	1996
Nadine O'Connor	2007
Jim O'Neill	2012
Al Oerter	1999
Larry Olson	2014
Len Olson	2002
Jim O'Neil	1998
Sumi Ondera-Leonard	2006
Bill Olrich	2014
Joan Ottaway	2000
David Pain	1997
Wendell Palmer	2004
Sandy Pashkin	2018
Ladislav Pataki	2008
Tom Patsalis	2003
Gary Patton	2017
Emil Pawlik	2004
Donald Pellmann	2020
Pat Peterson	1998
Roger Pierce	2008
Roy Pirrung	2001
Phil Raschker	1997
Alex Ratella	1999
Elton Richardson	2003
Stephen Robbins	2005
Bill Rodgers	2009
Orville Rogers	2020
Dave Romansky	2002
Gary Romesser	2012
Ruth Rothfarb	2007
Joan Samuelson	2014
Bob Schlau	2014
Melody Ann Schultz	2014
John Seto	2017
Nolan Shaheed	2004
Al Sheahen	1998
George Sheehan	1998
Dennis Simonaitis	2015
Becky Sisley	2001
Linda Somers-Smith	2012
Paul Spangler	1997
Maxwell E. Springer	2006
John (Jack) H. Starr	2006
Dorothy Stock	2007
Margie Ann Stoll	2014
James Stookey	2002
Mary L. Storey	2006
Larry Stuart	1999
Jim Sutton	2002
Pete Taylor	2016
Sue-Ellen Trapp	2004
Marcie Trent	2001
John Tuttle	2014
Joy Upshaw	2012
Warren Utes	1999
Rudy Valentine	2004
Johnnye Valien	2002
Sal Vasquez	2004
Gerald Vaughn	2009
Jim Vernon	2002
Betty Vosburgh	2002
Gordon Wallace	2003
Bob D. Ward	2008
Ken Weinbel	2002
Ruth Welding	2018
Jane Welzel	2015
Nate White	2008
Stan Whitley	2000
Algene Williams	2009
Thad Wilson	2017
Jerry Wojcik	2000
Herm Wyatt	2007
Craig Young	2014
Paul Zimmerman	2014
Bill Bangert	2010
Edward Burke	2010
Paul Edens	2010
Gary Hunter	2010
Oneithea Lewis	2010
Ralph Maxwell	2010
Leland McPhie	2010
Flo Meiler	2010
Howard Rubin	2010
George Vernosky	2010
Angela Bickel	2025
Kenton Brown	2025
Carroll DeWeese	2025
William Jankovich	2025
Damon Blakemore Sr	2025
Damien Leake	2025
Jeffery Davison	2025

== See also ==
- National Distance Running Hall of Fame
- RRCA Distance Running Hall of Fame
