= Masters M55 high jump world record progression =

This is the progression of world record improvements of the high jump M55 division of Masters athletics.

Key

Incomplete information Pending

Height	Athlete	Nationality	Birthdate	Location	Date
1.90	Carlo Thränhardt	Germany	05.07.1957	Eberstadt	23.08.2013
1.89	Carlo Thränhardt	Germany	05.07.1957	Bühll	21.06.2013
1.87 (tie)	Bruce McBarnette	United States	07.10.1957	Landover, Maryland	20.01.2013
1.87	Carlo Thränhardt	Germany	05.07.1957	Eberstadt	17.08.2012
1.85	Jaroslav Lorenç	Czech Republic	22.09.1953	Humpolec	27.09.2008
1.85 i	Vladimir Kuntsevich	Russia	06.08.1952	Moscow	05.04.2008
1.84	Thomas Zacharias	Germany	02.01.1947	Arrecife	25.01.2006
1.83	Jaroslav Hanuš	Czech Republic	16.04.1943	Cesenatico	13.09.1998
1.82	Asko Pesonen	Finland	15.04.1943	Viitasaari	25.08.1998
1.79	Herm Wyatt	United States	13.09.1931	Eugene	23.05.1987
