= Masters M50 high jump world record progression =

This is the progression of world record improvements of the high jump M50 division of Masters athletics.

Key

Incomplete information Pending Indoor mark before 2000, not acceptable for record

Height	Athlete	Nationality	Birthdate	Location	Date
2.00 i	Thomas Zacharias	Germany	02.01.1947	Birmingham	02.03.1997
1.95	Bruce McBarnette	United States	07.10.1957	Glassboro	29.05.2011
1.90	Asko Pesonen	Finland	15.04.1943	Leppavirta	24.09.1995
1.89	Mark Chelnov	Ukraine	15.03.1944	Athens	11.06.1994
1.88	Herm Wyatt	United States	13.09.1931	Los Gatos	20.08.1983
1.85	Richard "Dick" Richardson	United States	15.05.1933	San Juan	24.09.1983
1.79	John C. Brown	United States	04.12.1929		25.07.1981
