= Thomas Zacharias =

Thomas Zacharias may refer to:

- Thomas Zacharias (baseball) (died 1892), American baseball umpire
- Thomas Zacharias (high jumper) (born 1947), German high jumper
