= Kuntsevich =

Kuntsevich or Kuntsevych is a Slavic surname that may refer to the following people:

- Josaphat Kuntsevych (1580–1623), archbishop of the Ukrainian Greek Catholic Church
- Vladimir Kuntsevich (born 1952), Russian high jumper
- Yawhen Kuntsevich (born 1988), Belarusian football player
