= Masters M65 pole vault world record progression =

This is the progression of world record improvements of the pole vault M65 division of Masters athletics.

Key

Incomplete information Pending

Height	Athlete	Nationality	Birthdate	Location	Date
3.84	John Altendorf	United States	12.03.1946	Sacramento	06.07.2011
3.81	Art Parry	United States	04.04.1946	Tempe	25.06.2011
3.78	William Joe Johnson	United States	01.12.1943	Clermont	07.06.2009
3.77	Richmond "Boo" Morcom	United States	01.05.1921	Eugene	03.08.1986
3.60	Herbert Schmidt	Germany	11.01.1910	Duisburg	28.06.1975
