= Rex Harvey =

American decathlete (1946–2019)

Rex Jay Harvey (1946, Dexter, Iowa – December 22, 2019, Prescott, Arizona) was an American decathlete. He designed and held patents of several nozzles for aircraft engines. Also, he helped design several nuclear reactor power plants.

Harvey is a native of Redfield, Iowa and formerly resided in Mentor, Ohio.

== High school career ==
Harvey helped his Dexfield high school track and field team win two back to back state team championships in 1963 and 1964 under coach Dean Roe. While in high school, Harvey won many state titles as a pole vaulter and as a member of several relay teams.

== College career ==
Harvey earned a Bachelor of Science degree in mechanical engineering from Iowa State, where he was a scholarship athlete in track and field. He received four invitations to U.S. NCAA Division I Championships in track and field. He later earned a Master of Science degree in systems management from the University of Southern California.

== United States Air Force service ==
Following college, Harvey served his country in the United States Air Force, becoming a Vietnam War veteran and attaining the rank of captain. During his service, he represented the United States in track and field as a member of the military track and field team during numerous international competitions.

== Later track and field career ==
He represented the US on six international track and field teams competing in Italy, Brazil, Sweden and the Middle East, and in decathlon team competition with the Soviet Union and Canada. In 1972 and 1976, he was an Olympic Trials finalist in the decathlon, finishing 13th in 1976.

=== Drake Relays ===
Rex Harvey competed and officiated at the Drake Relays for many years. December 2020 Drake Relays announced the creation of the Drake Relays Rex Harvey Endowment for his service to Drake Relays.

=== Masters career ===
Harvey won straight 13 straight national decathlon championships. He also has several pentathlon championships as well as other national championships in the pole vault, relays, etc.

He has won several World Association of Veteran Athletes (WAVA) world championships, including the decathlon in 1989 and 1991, where he set a WAVA world record in M45 that still stands. He won the World Masters Athletics Championships pole vault in Japan in 1993 and was a member of the world championship 4X100 and 4X400 relays in 1991.

On June 20, 1982, he scored 7280 points to set what was then the American record for the men's decathlon for the M30-39 age group. On July 18, 1991, he scored 7780 points to set what was then the world record for the men's decathlon for the M40-49 age group.

He was USATF outstanding male masters combined-events athlete of the year in 1989, 1991, and 1996. In 2000, Rex Harvey was inducted into the USATF Masters Hall of Fame.

He was inducted into the USATF Masters Hall of Fame in 2000.

== Age-graded tables ==
Beginning in 1989, he collaborated with Alan L. Jones and several others to develop tables for grading athletic performances based on sex and age. The 1989 booklet Masters Age-Graded Tables by the National Masters News and the World Association of Veteran Athletes (WAVA) was later followed by the 1994 booklet Age-Graded Tables by National Masters News, P.O. Box 2372, Van Nuys, CA 91404. More recently, in 2004 Rex collaborated with Alan L. Jones and others to release an improved set of age-graded tables. The most recent version of the tables were published in 2010, still crediting Rex Harvey. These tables have been used extensively by both WAVA, which later became the World Masters Athletics (WMA), and USA Track & Field (USATF).

== Official ==
Rex Harvey was appointed WAVA (WMA) information technology coordinator and was elected as Vice President (Stadia) of WAVA (WMA) for two terms.

In 2007 at Osaka, Japan, during the 46th Congress of the International Association of Athletics Federations (IAAF), he was elected to the Master's Committee of the IAAF as a representative from the United States.

At the time of his death, he was the President of USATF Masters Track & Field.

Accomplishes USATF Masters Chair, USATF Masters Games Committee, 2007 USATF President's Award, and David Pain Award (2009, 1993 and 1992).

== Personal life ==
On July 6, 1946, Rex Jay Harvey was born to Leo Marvel Harvey, and Anna Alice (née Rote) Harvey in Dexter, Iowa. He married his wife Joan in 1969 and they remained married for fifty years until his death. They had two children Jared and Keelie.

Harvey was a Research Development Engineer at Parker Corporation in Cleveland, Ohio.

His grave is in East Linn Cemetery near Redfield, Iowa.

== See also ==
- Masters (athletics)
- Masters athletics (track and field)
- Masters athletics (track and field)#Age-graded tables
- USA Track & Field
- Senior Olympics
