= Norm Green (runner) =

American long-distance runner

Dr. Norman (Norm) Green (born June 27, 1932, in Oakland, California - died May 16, 2023 in Media, PA (age 90)) was an American long-distance runner. He set numerous American and World records over his career. He still holds the current M55 American record for the 10,000 metres. In 1996 he was elected into the inaugural class of the USATF Masters Hall of Fame, the first long-distance runner. For more than a decade, Green was the director of the Hall of Fame.

Green began running at Piedmont High School, running a 4:31.6 mile. He was the North Coast Section champion in the mile in 1950 which qualified him for the CIF California State Meet, but he didn't place in the final. He ran for two years at the nearby University of California, Berkeley, improving to 4:24, but he stopped running to concentrate on his studies. He wouldn't run competitively again for almost 30 years. After Baptist Divinity School he found his way to work for American Baptist National Ministries in Valley Forge, Pennsylvania.

On the road racing circuit, starting in 1981 he found himself far ahead of any other 50-year-olds. He still holds masters records in the M60 8 km, M50, M55 and M60 in the 15 km run, M50 and M60 10 mile run, M50, M55 and M60 20 km and half marathon, M50 25 km and M50 Marathon running sub-2:30 with a 2:29:11 at age 51. Those are just the official records, other marks not so recognized include a 2:25:52 marathon at age 52 and a 2:27:42 marathon at age 55, making him the oldest American to run under 2:30. A bout with prostate cancer in 1995 and injuries kept him out of running for almost 11 years but he returned to the competitive scene at age 74.

After retiring as a demographer for the Baptist National Ministries, he worked for his local Association of USATF and led the Hall of Fame Committee. Spending a reported 70 hours a week, he would prepare detailed dossiers of each candidate for the vote by the other members of the Hall of Fame, plus the nationwide administrators who elect members. His dramatic, sermon like speeches announcing each inductee's qualifications were legendary until his sudden retirement in 2011.

In addition to the Masters Hall of Fame, he is also a member of the Piedmont High School Hall of Fame.
