= Masters M45 400 metres world record progression =

This is the progression of world record improvements of the 400 metres M45 division of Masters athletics.

Key

Incomplete information Pending better indoor records

Hand	Auto	Athlete	Nationality	Birthdate	Location	Date	Ref
	48.55	Ricardo Menendez Gonzalez	Spain	26 August 1978	Alcobendas	6 July 2024	
	49.09	Allen Woodard	United States	16 November 1969	Houston	18 March 2017	
	49.32	Allen Woodard	United States	16.11.1969	Grand Rapids	15.07.2016	
	49.69	Allen Woodard	United States	16.11.1969	Houston	04.04.2015	
	49.89 i	Fred Sowerby	United States	11.12.1948	ATQ	29.01.1994	
	50.18	Khalid Mulazim	United States	28.03.1966	Berea	29.07.2011	
	50.20	Fred Sowerby	United States	11.12.1948	Eugene	12.08.1994	
	50.24	Stan Whitley	United States	17.12.1945	Los Angeles	12.07.1992	
	50.46	James Burnett	United States	13.01.1940	Rome	29.06.1985	
	50.61	Reginald Austin	Australia	16.10.1936	San Juan	23.09.1983	
	51.11	Milton Newton	United States	06.11.1933	Philadelphia	05.07.1980	
51.7		Richard "Dick" Stolpe	United States	03.03.1925	London	24.08.1972	
