= Charlie Booth =

Australian athlete (1903–2008)

- Born: 1 October 1903
- Died: 20 May 2008 (aged 104)
- Occupation(s): Athlete, inventor

Charlie Booth (1 October 1903 – 20 May 2008) was an Australian athlete.

== Career ==
In the 1930s, Booth was a champion runner who participated in several Stawell Gifts, achieving victory in 1939. He was also an apprentice fitter and turner. He is widely credited for inventing starting blocks for sprinting races, along with his father.

When he first used his invention in a race, made from a T-bar and a block of wood cut in half, he was disqualified for life. The decision was overturned a few weeks later.

At age 100, Booth gave a rare interview about his long and successful life.

In 2006, the then 102-year-old wanted to run in a special Stawell Gift over-40s race, the prize being a pig, but he subsequently decided against it.

== Death ==
In 2007, he celebrated his 104th birthday with a small private party. Nearly eight months later in May 2008, Booth died at the age of 104.
