= Bev LaVeck =

Beverly "Bev" LaVeck -Vander Veer -McCall (born Beverly Beers April 22, 1936 in Seattle, Washington - February 22, 2011 in Leavenworth, Washington) was a masters racewalker. From the late 1970s until her death, her name was synonymous with the masters division of the sport of race walking in the United States. She still holds numerous American records in race walking including most distances in the W60 division. Not only was she in the record books, she was the keeper of those records for most of that time both for USATF (and its predecessor TAC) and for World Masters Athletics (and its predecessor WAVA). She was elected into the inaugural class of the USATF Masters Hall of Fame.

== Personal life ==
A two time widow with four children, she married Mac McCall on April 5, 2006 and her last name in the record books changed as she began setting records in the W70 division as Bev McCall. After an education at West Seattle High School, Mills College and the University of Washington, she was employed as a school psychologist for the Edmonds School District and later at the University of Washington. She also worked with the Red Cross to counsel disaster victims. She died in an automobile accident.

== Racewalking ==
Like many other fitness oriented people and as the daughter of the director of the West Seattle YMCA, Bev joined the running boom of the 1970's, taking a liking to marathon running. But stress fractures and other injuries began to add up. She sought another outlet, finding it in the highly visible Seattle race walk community, taking her first class in 1980. She went on to become a Master level USATF official, an IAAF Level One judge, race director, instructor, administrator, team leader for the Pacific Pacers Club and all around cheerleader for the sport.
