= Bob Mimm =

American racewalker (1924–2017)

Robert Franklin Mimm (October 18, 1924 – May 7, 2017) was an American racewalker who competed in the 1960 Summer Olympics.

Mimm was born October 18, 1924, to Paul Charles Kinaley and Violet Meriam Mimm and was raised by his grandparents, Horace and Bertha Mimm, in Lancaster, Pennsylvania, where he spent his childhood and graduated from McCaskey High School in 1943.

After graduation, he was inducted into the United States Army Air Corps, completing Airplane Mechanics School in 1943 and Aerial Gunnery School in 1944. During World War II, he served in the India-China Division and worked as an airplane mechanic during the Air Transport Command’s perilous mission known as "Flying the Hump".

Following his service in World War II, he graduated from Millersville State College in 1950 with a Bachelor of Science degree in Education. His first teaching position was in a one-room schoolhouse for Amish children in Blue Ball, Pennsylvania.

He interrupted his teaching career to join the Army Reserve in 1950 and was assigned to the 64th Tank Battalion during the Korean War. A tank commander, he recalled the first round of fire with the 120 mm guns: "I was standing in the torrent and was knocked to the floor of the tank. My ears rang for several days." He attributed hearing deficit to this experience. After active duty in 1952, he remained in the Army Reserves until 1986. He attended Military Police School and became a fully accredited special agent with the Criminal Investigation Division in 1974 and served as president of the division from 1981 – 1983.

When he returned from the Korean War, he went back to teaching school at various locations in Pennsylvania and taught all grades from 1st thru 12th. English and history were his specialties. He also coached junior and senior high school track. Over the years, he furthered his own education and added a Master of Education Administration and Supervision from Rutgers University in 1956 and a Master of Arts in Guidance and Counseling from Trenton State College in 1974. In 1962, he obtained a civilian position with the U.S. Army as Education Advisor of military personnel at Fort Dix, New Jersey. He held the same position while stationed for two years (1966-1968) in Germany and then returned to Fort Dix as Education Advisor until 1979 when he took the position as Equal Employment Opportunity Officer. Bob also taught criminology and sociology courses at Burlington County College in New Jersey. He retired in 1986.

Bob was physically active his entire life. He was a well-rounded athlete in high school and college competing in wrestling, cross country, gymnastics and track and field. In high school his 5’11 frame weighed 136 pounds. He maintained a thin physique his entire life and was known by the nickname "Fats". In 1955, he responded to an advertisement for a meal and medal to competitors who completed a 15-mile race walk in a specified time at Lake Hopatcong, NJ. He finished under the time limit but was too tired to eat and blisters developed that kept him from walking for several days but the sport piqued his interest. He developed a lifelong love for race walking and began competing in about 25 races a year. He even took a job as letter carrier with the United States Post Office from 1959- 1962 to spend working hours training. His labors were rewarded in 1960 when he qualified for a berth on the United States Olympic team as a competitive racewalker in the 20K. In 1964 he was the subject of an article in Sports Illustrated. Bob won Eastern, National, North American and Pan American Track Championships in Master’s Competition. He competed in World Masters Championships starting in 1975 and brought home the gold medal 10 times for individual performance in the racewalk. Bob was selected three times as racewalker of the year in the Masters category by United States Track & Field. He held national as well as world records in his sport. He also completed numerous marathons competing as a race walker in a field of runners. He was inducted into the USATF Masters Hall of Fame, Shore AC Hall of Fame and The New Jersey Sports Writers Hall of Fame. At age 91 he was still walking five miles a day at Mill Creek Park in Willingboro.

After retirement, he indulged his passion for travel and set foot on all seven continents. His adventures in over 100 countries mostly involved hiking and mountain climbing.

He had two children with first wife Anne (Weber) - Bonita and Richard - and five children with wife Theresa (Symanowicz) - Randolph, Roberta, Noreen, Clifford, Douglas.

He died at home in Willingboro, New Jersey, at age 92 on May 7, 2017, after battling prostate cancer for three years. His ashes were distributed on his favorite hiking mountain, Pikes Peak in Colorado, by his family.
