= Richard Phillips (American high jumper) =

American high jumper (1927–2003)

Richard 'Dick' Phillips
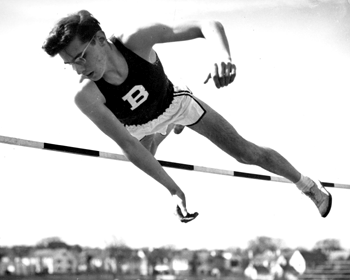
- Phillips clears a bar using the Western Roll technique

Personal information
- National team: United States
- Born: June 3, 1927 Quincy, Massachusetts
- Died: October 29, 2003 (aged 76) Ocean View, Delaware
- Resting place: Arlington National Cemetery
- Height: 1.90 m (6 ft 3 in)
- Weight: 72 kg (159 lb)

Sport
- Sport: Athletics
- Event: High jump
- College team: Brown University

Achievements and titles
- Highest world ranking: 2nd (1949)
- Personal best: 6 ft 8 in (2.03 m) (1949)

Richard Phillips (June 3, 1927 - October 29, 2003) was an American high jumper who won the 1949 NCAA high jump championship.

== Early life ==
Phillips was born in Quincy, Massachusetts in 1927. He attended Hingham High School where he was a star track athlete, winning the high jump and pole vault at the Massachusetts Interscholastic Meet and going undefeated in both events in his senior season. Phillips was taught to high jump by former Brown University track athlete Hugh Bain using home-made standards in his backyard in Hingham. After graduating from high school in 1945, Phillips spent a year and a half as a surgical technician for the army stationed at Murphy General Hospital.

== Collegiate career ==
Starting in the spring of 1946, Phillips enrolled at Brown University as an English major. He also continued his high jump career where he had great success. In his first meet he set the Brown Field record and had an undefeated freshman campaign.

=== 1948 Season ===
In his 1948 indoor debut at the K of C meet, Phillips defeated 1947 AAU national champion Dave Albritton with a leap of 6 ft 7 in (2.01 m) and set a new Boston Garden record and K of C meet record. This success would continue through the season as Phillips placed second in the indoor AAU championships and later qualified for the 1948 NCAA Championships. He finished the year ranked as the eighth best high jumper in the world.

=== 1949 Season ===
==== Indoors ====
In 1949, Phillips starred in the high jump on the collegiate, national, and international level. During the indoor season, Phillips won the Ivy league championships and AAU national meet, setting an Ivy League and Brown University record with a lifetime best jump of 6 ft 8 in (2.03m) in the Ivy League championships at Harvard's Briggs Cage. This mark was only 1.75 in (4.4 cm) shorter than the indoor world record set by Mel Walker in 1937.

==== Outdoors ====
After an early season loss in rainy conditions against Army at West Point, Phillips would continue his winning ways in the outdoor season with a win at Penn Relays. While at this meet, Phillips misplaced his athlete credentials and had to pay $1.80 in order to enter the meet which he ended up winning with a leap of 6 ft 5 in (1.96m). Phillips won his next competition against NYU where he faced off against star high jumper, decathlete, and football player Irving Mondschein. The next three weeks Phillips would be competing in the Ivy League, New England, and IC4A championship meets. He finished first in all three meets, and also set the meet record with each victory, although he did finish the IC4A meet in a tie with Mondschein at 6 ft 7 7/8 in (2.03m). This height added an inch to the record Mondschein had set the previous year.

After completing a sweep of the Northeast championship meets available to him, Phillips was selected to travel to the British Isles with a contingent of American athletes prior to the NCAA and AAU national meets. These other athletes included Bill Dwyer, former Brown sprint star; Harrison Dillard, Fred Wilt, Curtis Stone, Herb Douglas, Dick Ault, Dave Bolen, and Frank Fox. From June 2 to June 14, these athletes competed at meets in London, Dublin, Belfast, and Glasgow. While competing at one of the meets in Ireland, Phillips broke the record for the highest jump on Irish soil. He won three of the four meets on the tour, although the only loss came at an event in Glasgow where the other competitors received a 15 in (38.1 cm) handicap.

When Phillips returned, he had a back injury that he suffered at the meet in Belfast which jeopardized his chances of competing in the upcoming national meets. He responded well to the treatments and traveled to the Los Angeles Memorial Coliseum for the NCAA Championship meet. With a jump of 6 ft 7 in (2.01 m) Phillips again defeated Mondschein by one inch and claimed the NCAA high jump championship. He was the first Brown University athlete to win an event at the NCAA meet. The next week at Ratcliffe Stadium in Fresno, California, Phillips repeated the feat and won the AAU national meet with jump of 6 ft 6 1/2 in (1.99 m) completing his sweep of every major national championship meet in 1949.

For his win at the AAU National Meet, Phillips earned a trip to Oslo, Norway, to represent the United States in a meet against the Scandinavian countries. Phillips and Mondschein were two of the high jump representatives for the United States, and every athlete who competed on the trip to the British Isles was also invited. Phillips was defeated at the meet by 1948 Olympic gold medalist triple jumper Arne Aahman.

===== Season Awards =====
Phillips closed the year ranked as the #1 high jumper in the United States and the #2 high jumper in the world, behind only Alan Paterson of Great Britain. This season also earned him the Rhode Island Athlete of the Year Award and a place on the Collegiate Honor Roll (The equivalent to all American Honors from 1925 to 1941).

=== 1950 Season ===
During his senior season in 1950, Phillips served as the team captain for the indoor and outdoor seasons. He would successfully defend his indoor and outdoor Ivy League high jump titles, and also took second place at the Millrose Games. An ankle injury would hamper him throughout the season.

=== Athletic Legacy ===
In his time at Brown, Phillips was a four time Heptagonal champion, a two time IC4A champion, a two time AAU national champion, an NCAA champion, and held a number of records at the high school, collegiate, national, and international level. His 1949 season was one of the best on record by an American high jumper, collegian or professional. Phillips was inducted into the Brown University Athletics Hall of Fame in 1971.

== Later life ==
Phillips married in 1951 while he working for general electric. He remarried in 1966 after the passing of his first wife. He also worked as a real estate broker until retiring in 1995. Phillips passed away in 2003 at age 76, and was Interred at Arlington National Cemetery.
