= Starting blocks =

Device used in the sport of track and field by sprint athletes

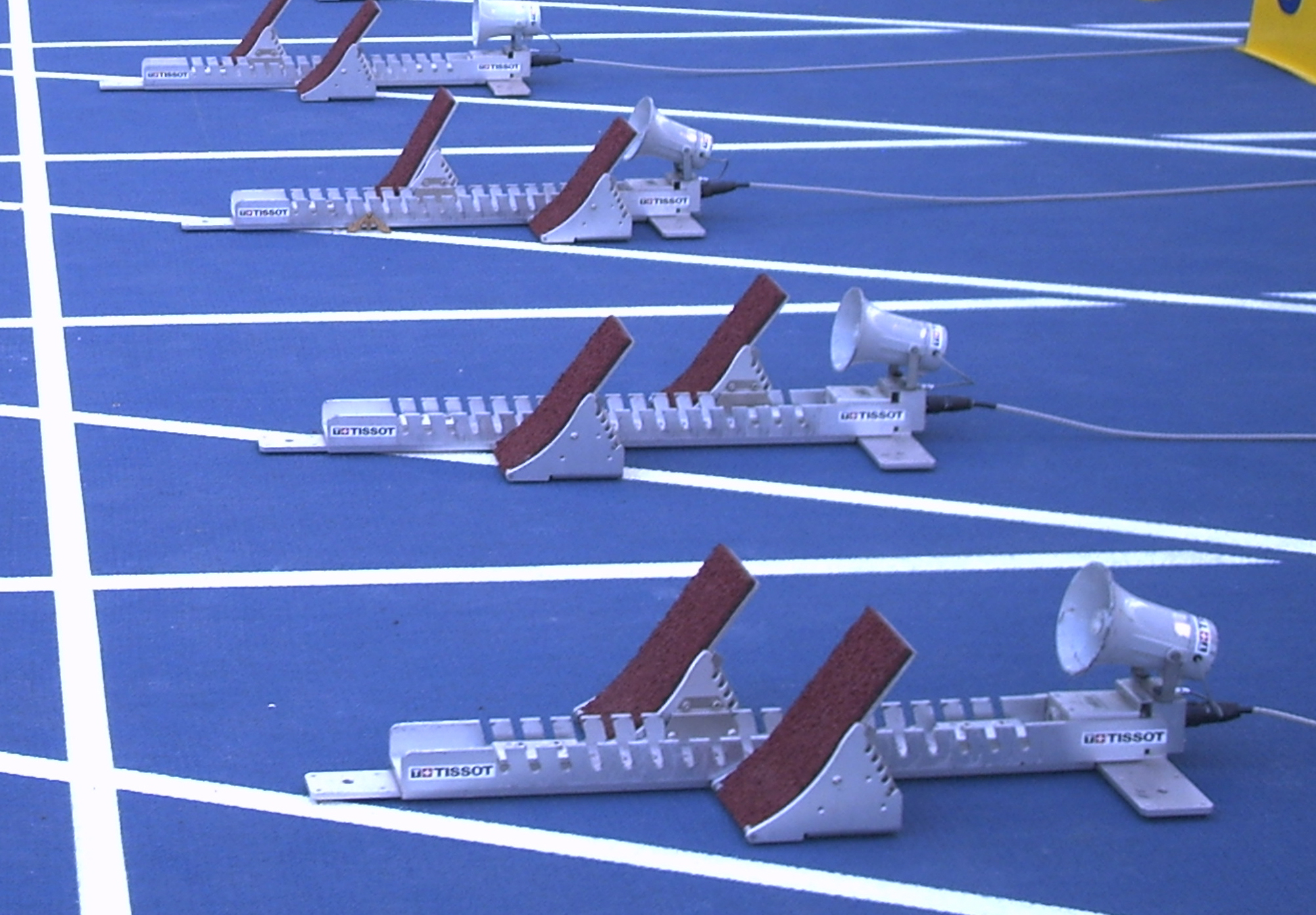
Pressure-sensitive starting blocks with loudspeakers. A pressure sensor will detect an early start and the loudspeakers provide the runners with the sound from the starter all at the same time.

Starting blocks are a device used in the sport of track and field by sprint athletes to brace their feet against at the start of a race so they do not slip as they stride forward at the sound of the starter's pistol. The blocks also enable the sprinters to adopt a more efficient starting posture and isometrically preload their muscles in an enhanced manner. This allows them to start more powerfully and increases their overall sprint speed capability. For most levels of competition, including the whole of high-level international competition, starting blocks are mandatory equipment for the start of sprint races.

== History ==
The invention of starting blocks is credited to Australian Charlie Booth and his father in 1929. Prior to this, runners would dig holes in the dirt track. Trowels were provided at the start of races. This was not the most consistent or stable system. It also was destructive to the track surface with the holes having to be filled for subsequent runners. When George Simpson became the first person to run 9.4 seconds for the 100-yard dash in 1930, his record was disallowed because he used starting blocks. The official use of starting blocks at the start of sprint races began in 1938, when they were authorized by the IAAF. Most runners in the 800 meters at the 1956 Olympics used starting blocks from a waterfall (i.e. staggered) start.

Wood was the first material used, with some tracks having permanently-placed wooden starting blocks as built-in structures at the start line. Portable blocks were held by long metal spikes that needed to be pounded into the ground. These devices evolved into metal blocks. The common blocks of the 1960s were heavy and adjusted by screws that were frequently broken or became rusted over the years. Lighter-weight blocks were made of sheet metal. Nick Newton's innovative design uses cast aluminium.

The rubberized surfaces of new all-weather running tracks that became common starting in the 1970s, made the old blocks even less secure. Original Tartan tracks left long holes to secure the blocks but most tracks today require blocks to be held by small spikes similar to the ones used in shoes. Block slippage was common enough that it is an allowable loophole in the rules to recall the start of a race without calling a false start against an athlete whose blocks slip.

During the 1960s and 1970s, the height of starting blocks was low, allowing the heel to be exposed. This was popular because the calf muscle was able to produce greater force output and was famously used by Valeriy Borzov. Starting in the late 1980s and early 1990s, higher blocks became more common. These allowed for full foot contact which was theorized to be able to generate greater force. Many took notice of this with Ben Johnson and his leaping starts between 1986 and 1988.

== Modern use ==
Generally most races of 400 meters or shorter allow athletes to use starting blocks.

Modern blocks used for world records now must have sensors that detect the pressure from the athlete and can be used to time their reaction to the starting gun. Athletes who react faster than one-tenth of a second can be charged with a false start and the race recalled. Many also carry electronic speakers so the sound of the gun arrives at the ears of the athletes at exactly the same time. Some races for hearing-impaired athletes have also used starting light systems, similar to motorsport's Christmas Tree.

In some amateur settings, such as high school track, since block slippage is much more common due to lower quality track surface material and/or starting blocks' spike quality, it is a commonly accepted practice to allow another person (usually a teammate) to sit on the ground behind the starting block and place their feet behind each block, using their leg power to further reduce the chance for the blocks to slip back when the runner launches.

== Technique ==
Research on the biomechanics of using starting blocks, as well as runners and coaches (e.g., Ken Harnden), focus on setting up, positioning, and pushing off blocks.

=== Block setup ===
When setting up the starting blocks, athletes adjust the position of the pedals to their preferred stance. A common position places the front pedal two foot lengths and the back pedal three foot lengths behind the starting line. Eventually, athletes will be able to adjust pedals back and forth and even switch stances to find a setting that meets their individual preferences. As for the angle of the pedals, most athletes will have the pedals set at 45 degrees. Similar to the position, athletes will adjust the angle of each pedal so that they are able to get the best push off.

=== "On your marks" and "set" ===
The first position comes when the track official says "On Your Marks". When getting into the blocks, the athlete's front foot provides the most pushing power. This is usually the one that they use to naturally kick and jump off of. The hands of the athlete should be positioned so that the tips of their fingers are spread out touching the track with their thumbs and pointer fingers right behind the line. The arms will be positioned so that they are perpendicular to the track and shoulder width apart. The body of the athlete in this position is relaxed and still.

The next position is commonly referred to as the "Set" position. When the official says "Set", athletes in blocks will raise their hips above the shoulders for a short period of time before the starting pistol is shot. In this positions their shoulders will fall just slightly over the starting line. The front leg of the athlete will be angled at around 90 degrees while the back will be around 120 degrees.

=== Push-off ===
When the gun goes off, the aim of the athlete is to maximize their velocity in the shortest time that they can by pushing off the blocks. The athlete's reaction time and technique coming out of the blocks is important. The front leg is the one that the athlete will push off with and is the main source of power generated during the start. At the same time, the back leg should be pulled towards the torso with the opposite arm swinging forward. The goal of the athlete is to drive forward and get their foot on the ground as quickly as they can while having their shins angled at 45 degrees with the track.

== See also ==
- Nick Newton
- Sprint (running)
- 60m
- 100m
- 200m
- 400m
