= Thomas Zacharias (high jumper) =

German high jumper

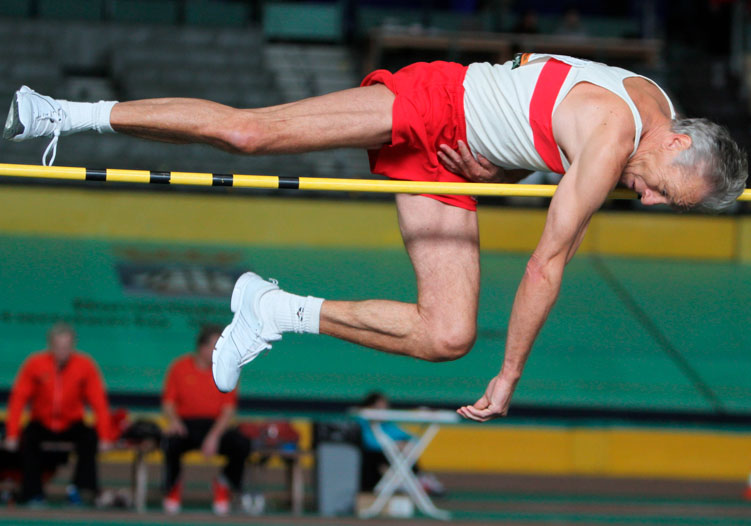
- Zacharias in 2013

Personal information
- Born: 2 January 1947 (age 79) Bad Harzburg, Germany
- Height: 1.85 m (6 ft 1 in)
- Weight: 76 kg (168 lb)

Sport
- Sport: High jump
- Club: USC Mainz

Thomas Michael Zacharias (born 2 January 1947) is a German high jumper. He competed in the 1968 Olympics and finished in 14th place with a jump of 2.09 m. He set five national records (2.17 to 2.20 in 1970). His personal best is 2.22 m (world's best indoor 1971).

At the West German championships, Zacharias won a single medal, the gold i 1968. At the West German indoor championships, he won silver in 1969 followed by two straight gold medals in 1970 and 1971. He represented the clubs SC Charlottenburg and USC Mainz.

Zacharias continues competing internationally, in the masters categories, where he set dozens of world records. Two of them, 2.00 m indoor and 1.98 m outdoor in the M50 age group, have stood since 1997. Zacharias is a lifelong proponent of the straddle technique in the high jump.

Records by Thomas Zacharias
Height (m)	Set	Broken	Age category (years)	Record
2.17			30–34	NR
2.10			35–39	NR
2.00	10 September 1988		40–44	NR
1.96	7 October 1996		45–49	NR
2.00	2 March 1997	Current	50–54	WR(i)
1.84	25 January 2006	5 April 2008	55–59	WR
1.80	27 April 2007	16 August 2012	60–64	WR
1.65	12 March 2014	Current	65–69	WR(i)

(i) = indoors, WR = world record, ER = European record, NR = national record

== Biography ==
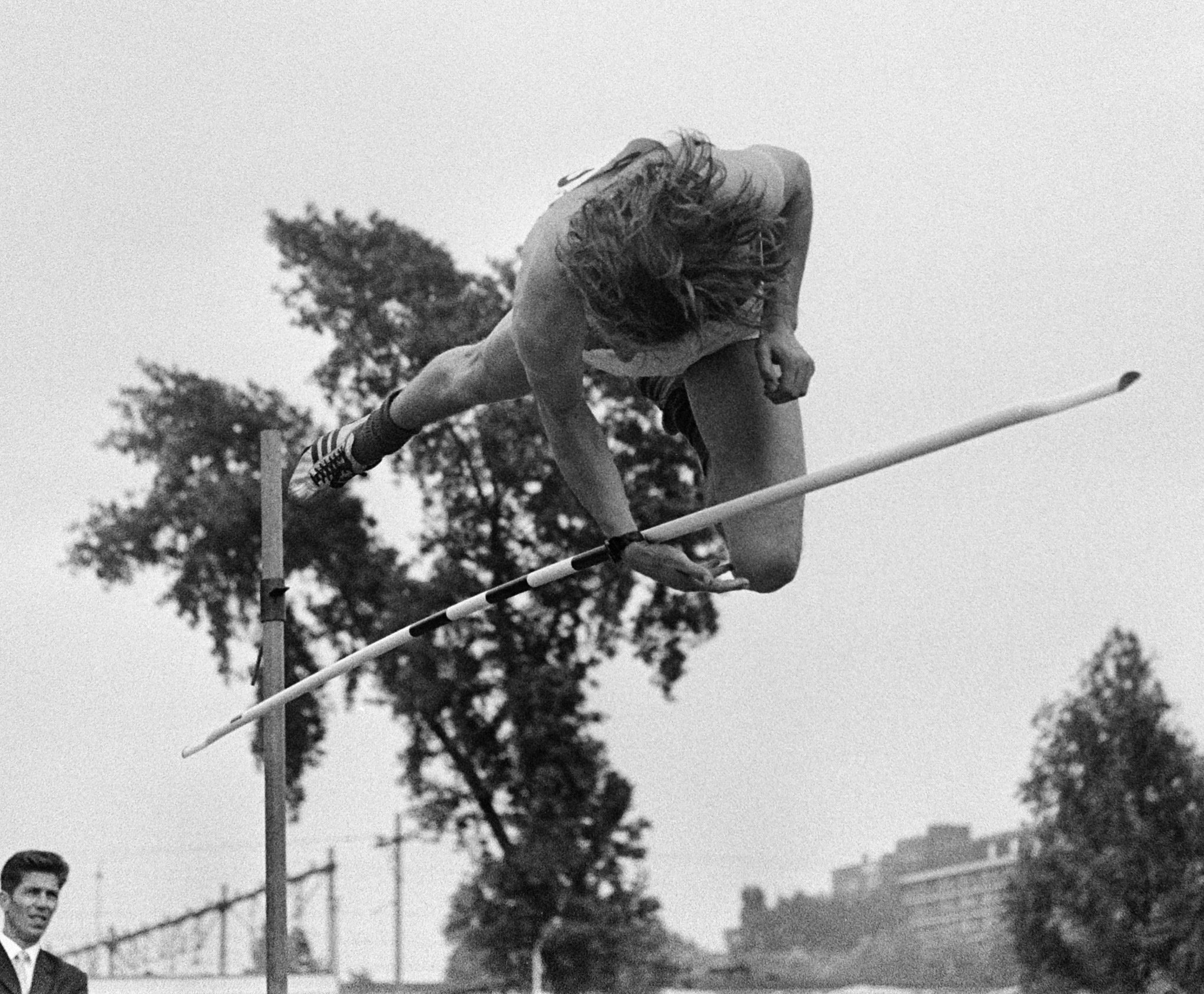
Zacharias in 1970

Zacharias was born to Hella and Helmut Zacharias. His father (died 2002) was a famous violin player, composer and orchestra director, his sister Sylvia holds a PhD in social sciences, and his brother Stephan is a composer and music producer for film and television. Zacharias has a son, Alejandro, and daughter Cristina, with Lola López, a sports teacher.

Zacharias completed his school studies in Hamburg (Germany), Genoa (Italy) and Ascona (Switzerland). He continued his education in Paris, Berlin and Mainz, studying philosophy and psychology, but majoring in physical education, and since the 1980s has lived on Lanzarote, one of the Canary Islands. In the 2000s, besides competing in the high jump and being a track and field coach, he became a specialist in golf biomechanics and tuition and published two books on the subject. In 1999–2002 he worked as a psychologist with the national golf amateur team and in 2002-2008 was instruction advisor to the PGA of Germany.

== Books ==
- Thomas Zacharias (1985). Was es Heisst ein Mensch zu Sein. Zacharias. ISBN 9783921911037.
- Thomas Zacharias (1987). Drei Komplexe sind normal: d. für jeden Menschen wichtigsten Erkenntnisse d. Tiefen-Psychosomatik. T. Zacharias. ISBN 9783921911044.
- Thomas Zacharias (1997) Hoch- und Weitsprung Perfekt, Nentershausen
- Thomas Zacharias (2007) Golfprofis schwingen nicht – sie schlagen: Die richtige Technik verstehen und erlernen. Kosmos. ISBN 3440106926
- Thomas Zacharias (2011) Der neue Golfschlag. Kosmos. ISBN 3440127710
