= Theresa Manuel =

American basketball player and track athlete

Theresa Manuel (January 7, 1926 – November 21, 2016) was an American basketball player and track athlete who competed in the 80-meter hurdles, javelin, and 4×440 yard relay in the 1948 Olympics in London. She attended Middleton High School in Tampa, Florida and the Tuskegee Institute. She taught and coached at Middleton High School and Hillsborough High School for a total of 38 years.

== Personal life ==
Manuel was born on January 7, 1926, in Port Tampa, Florida. She attended Middleton High School in Tampa, Florida, and the Tuskegee Institute (now Tuskegee University) in Alabama. After graduating, she was engaged to be married but returned to Tampa to care for her ill mother instead. She remained in Florida for the entirety of her life and never married. She died on November 21, 2016, at the age of 90.

== Athletic career ==
Manuel played basketball at Middleton High School, and continued to play at Tuskegee, earning the nickname “Trick Shot.” She set a single-game record in basketball of 57 points while at Tuskegee. She also started running track in college, and was the AAU indoor 50-meter hurdles champion in 1948, her third year at Tuskegee. Tuskegee was undefeated in track and basketball during Manuel's time there. In 1948, she joined the Olympic team and competed in the 80-meter hurdles, javelin, and 4×440 yard relay in the 1948 Olympics in London. She was the first African American woman to compete in the javelin at the Olympics and the first black woman from Florida to compete in the Olympics. Manuel did not medal, but her teammate Alice Coachman won the high jump, becoming the first African American woman to win an Olympic gold.

== Coaching career ==
After graduating Tuskegee, Manuel became a teacher and basketball coach at her alma mater, Middleton High School. She coached the girls basketball team through three state championships. When Middleton closed in 1971, she moved to Hillsborough High and coached basketball, swimming, majorettes, and dancerettes. She was named Hillsborough County Coach of the Year in 1975 and Florida Coach of the Year in 1976. She retired in 1988. In 1994, Manuel became first African-American woman to be inducted into the Tampa Sports Hall of Fame. In 2004, the track at Middleton High School was named the Theresa A. Manuel Track and Field.
