= Vladimir Kuntsevich =

Russian high jumper and coach

Personal information
- Born: 6 August 1952 (age 73)

Sport
- Sport: High jump
- Club: Kuntsevich club

Vladimir Ilyich Kuntsevich (Russian: Владимир Ильич Кунцевич; born 6 August 1952) is a Russian high jumper and jumping coach. Since 2012 he holds the world record in the M60 age group at 1.81 m. Previously he held a world record in the M55 category.

Kuntsev was the first coach of Ivan Ukhov, and currently coaches his daughters Yekaterina and Daria, who compete at the national level.
