= Boo Morcom =

American athlete (1921–2012)

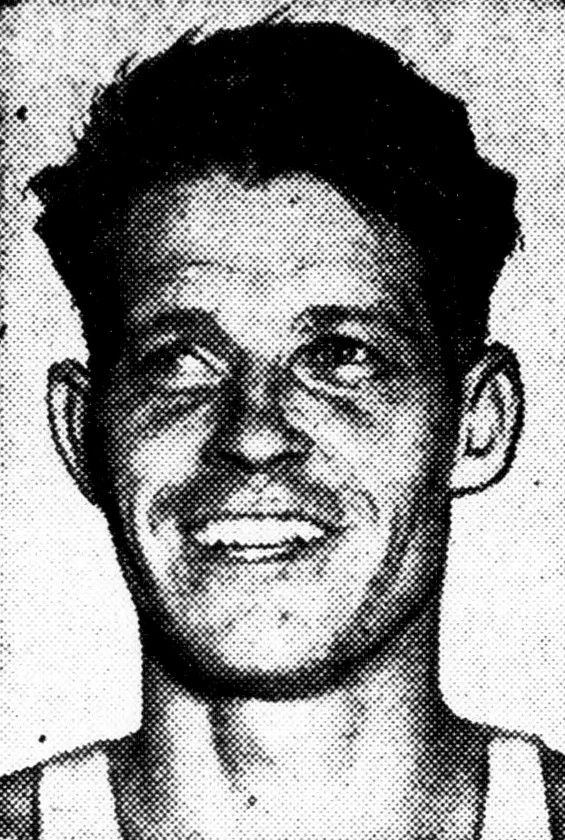

Personal information
- National team: United States
- Height: 1.72 m (5 ft 8 in)
- Weight: 67 kg (148 lb)

Sport
- Sport: Athletics
- University team: New Hampshire Wildcats

Achievements and titles
- Highest world ranking: 2nd (1947, 1948)
- Personal bests: Pole vault 4.49 (14ft 9 in) (1949); Long jump 7.23 m (23 ft 8 3/4 in) (1947); High jump 1.94 m (6ft 4 1/2 in) (1947)

Albert Richmond "Boo" Morcom (May 1, 1921 – October 3, 2012) was an American track and field athlete.

== Early career ==
Richmond Morcom was born the youngest of six brothers in Braintree, Massachusetts. He got the nickname "Boo" from a German doll called "Bubi".

He started pole vaulting at ten years old using a flag pole and standards he constructed in his backyard, noting that his size limited him in other sports. While he is primarily known for his exploits in the pole vault event, he demonstrated versatility in other events including long jump and high jump. He set several records at Braintree High School. At the age of 19 he was the best pole vaulter in the state of Massachusetts. He became known as "the Barefoot Boy" for his habit of high jumping with one shoe on and one shoe off.

His fame began to spread as he went on an athletic exhibition tour of Canada with three other athletes including Babe Ruth.

== University of New Hampshire ==
In 1940, Morcom took his athletic skills to the University of New Hampshire under coach Paul Sweet. He also continued his habit of jumping with one shoe, causing the Boston newspaper sport pages to refer to him as "One Shoe Boo". He wanted to start going by "Richie" when starting at UNH, but some old friends ensured the nickname "Boo" stuck.

While at New Hampshire, Morcom would become a champion in the pole vault and jumps, and set a number of long standing records. In the pole vault, he won the 1942 USA Indoor Track and Field Championships and 1947 Outdoor NCAA Championship. He was ranked by Track & Field News as the second best pole vaulter in the world in 1947. As a high jumper he finished in second place at the 1942 USA indoor championships and won the 1947 Outdoor New England Championship, besting future U.S. champion Dick Phillips. He also claimed the long jump at the same 1947 New England meet. At the time of his graduation with a degree in biology, he held the pole vault, high jump, and long jump records at UNH. His long jump record would stand for 67 years until it was surpassed in 2009.

== Military Service ==
From 1943 to 1946 Morcom's studies were interrupted by World War II. He returned to UNH to become the 1947 NCAA pole vault champion. In 1950 he was recalled to the Army's 101st Airborne Division "Screaming Eagles" as an officer and Jumpmaster for the Korean War. During his time in the service he would claim the 1945 USA Outdoor Track and Field title in the pole vault.

== Olympics ==
Video on YouTube Official VideoPole Vault competition starts @ 26:10Morcom's final attempt @ 28:20

Morcom won the 1948 U.S Olympic Trials, earning an opportunity to represent the United States at the 1948 London Olympic Games. Although he entered the meet as a favorite, he finished sixth. Morcom passed at the lesser heights, then during a rainstorm, missed the height of 4.20 meters which the eventual winners would clear. A week later in Belgium he beat the vaulters that had beat him in the Olympics, as well as the Olympic winning height by 6 inches. His son David said that Morcom would call competing at the Olympics, "One of the greatest achievements of his life." Morcom would finish the 1948 season again ranked as the number two vaulter in the world according to Track & Field News.

In 1956, Morcom would return to Olympics to coach the field events for the United States Women's Olympic Track Team in Melbourne. He said he preferred to participate in the Olympics as a coach since he remained part of the games without the anxiety.

== Coaching ==
Starting in 1948, Morcom became an assistant track and field coach and taught physical education at the University of Pennsylvania. During this time he would remain a competitive athlete, competing at college and masters meets and winning the 1948 USA Outdoor Track and Field Championships and 1949 USA Indoor Track and Field Championships, his fifth and sixth national titles. While at Penn, he also started one of the first high school track teams for girls in 1954 and opened the Penn athletic facilities to poor minority high school students. He would coach at Penn for 35 years before returning to coach in New Hampshire, where he spent time coaching at Concord High School, Lebanon High School, and Kearsarge Regional High School, among others.

== Masters athletics ==
Morcom continued to compete in athletics as he advanced in age, competing in college meets through his 40s. As an early pioneer of masters athletics, he held the world record for the pole vault as he passed through each of the age divisions between age 50 and 70, plus world records in the high jump, long jump, decathlon, and pentathlon. He continued to vault past age 75, still ranked number one.

He became well known for these activities, encountering, by his recollection, Jesse Owens, Wilt Chamberlain, and Jackie Robinson. He appeared on The Bob Hope Show. He was inducted into the USATF Masters Hall of Fame in 1997. He is also in the Braintree High School Athletic Hall of Fame, the UNH Athletic Hall of Fame, the Pole Vault Hall of Fame, the Massachusetts Track Coaches Hall of Fame, and as a coach in the Women's Track and Field Hall of Fame.

In 1987, at the age of 66, he was still able to jump 12'6" in the pole vault, as high as any high school athlete in the state of New Hampshire. He was awarded the New Hampshire Male Athlete of the Year Trophy.

“I went to 105 different countries. I won records everywhere. I've been there, done that, got the T-shirt and caught malaria ... I would go to Canada, set a record, come home. My wife would have my bag packed, and 12 hours later I was in South America talking to Eva Peron ... When we get to heaven, we'll have a track meet, And everybody will be young and strong.”

== Author and historian ==
Morcom was a member of Mensa International. He wrote articles on a range of subjects including the Hale family of New Hampshire and detailed antique bottles, which he was known as an expert in. He also took cover photos for magazines and created various other works of art.

== Personal life ==
Morcom was married for 19 years and had three children. He later moved to Sunapee, New Hampshire and retired from athletics in 2001 at the age of 80. He suffered a mild stroke and broken hip in 2003, but recovered and remained sharp. he died in New Hampshire the age of 91.
