= Bernice Robinson (athlete) =

American hurdler (1927–2019)

Personal information
- Full name: Claudealia Bernice Robinson
- Born: February 28, 1927 Chicago, Illinois, United States
- Died: October 14, 2019 (aged 92)

Sport
- Sport: Track and field
- Event: 80 metres hurdles

Claudealia Bernice Robinson (February 28, 1927 – October 14, 2019) was an American hurdler. She competed in the women's 80 metres hurdles at the 1948 Summer Olympics.

After the Olympics she moved to Cleveland. She continued to compete in Masters athletics under her married name of Bernice Robinson Holland as a thrower. In 1986, she was inducted into the Greater Cleveland Hall of Fame. Bernice was voted to the USATF Masters Hall of Fame in 2001.
