= Marco Segatel =

Italian male high jumper masters athlete (born 1962)

Personal information
- Nationality: Italian
- Born: 23 March 1962 (age 64) Milan

Sport
- Country: Italy
- Sport: Masters athletics
- Event: High jump
- Club: Olimpia Amatori Rimini

Achievements and titles
- Personal bests: High jump: 2.12 m (1985); High jump M45: 2.04 m (2007) AR; High jump M55: 1.91 m (2017) WR
Medal record
World Masters Championships
Gold medal – first place	2003 Carolina	High jump M40
Gold medal – first place	2005 San Sebastian	High jump M40
Gold medal – first place	2007 Riccione	High jump M45
Gold medal – first place	2009 Lahti	High jump M45
Gold medal – first place	2015 Lyon	High jump M50
Gold medal – first place	2018 Malaga	High jump M55

Marco Segatel (born 23 March 1962) is an Italian male high jumper masters athlete.

== Biography ==
Segatel is current holder of the master's world record of the high jump M55. He won five gold medals in six different editions (from 2003 to 2018) at the World Masters Athletics Championships.

== Records ==
=== World record ===
- High jump M55: 1.91 m, (Italy) Orvieto, 8 July 2017 - current holder.

=== European record ===
- High jump M45: 2.04 m, (Italy) Cernusco sul Naviglio, 19 July 2007 - current holder.
- High jump M55: 1.87 m, (Spain) Madrid, 21 March 2018 - current holder.

== See also ==
- List of world records in masters athletics
- List of European records in masters athletics
