= Bruce McBarnette =

American actor

Bruce McBarnette is a masters high jumper and has broken world records for his age group. He has won 12 world championships and 35 USA Track and Field Masters National Championships. He was inducted into the USATF Masters Hall of Fame in 2009. He is also a television actor.

== Early life ==
McBarnette is the son of Yvette Francis-McBarnette and Olvin R. McBarnette. He graduated from Princeton University and New York University School of Law. He also served as a Captain in the United States Army.
