= Nick Newton =

Newton Starting Blocks

Milton "Nick" Newton (November 6, 1933, in Tarboro, North Carolina, United States – March 31, 2018, in Palm Springs, California) was the inventor of the Newton Starting Blocks. Newton blocks are considered by many to be the best in the world, used at many major track meets like the Mt. SAC Relays.

Starting blocks are the device sprinters use to hold their feet at the start of a race so they do not slip as they push out at the sound of the gun.

Using his experience as a tool and die maker for Waste King, Newton invented a cast aluminum block design as an improvement for his daughter Pam, who was excelling in girls' track. Newton's solid, but lightweight versions greatly improved on the flimsy or rusty old devices that had been standard equipment for decades. Obtaining his first patent in 1978 Newton has subsequently patented two additional innovations to offer sprinters more possible settings to prepare for their start.

He became heavily involved as a mentor for the L.A. Mercurettes Track Club, an elite track club of the 1970s and 80's. In 1976, he joined Olympian John Carlos in an athletic delegation arranged by Henry Kissinger to the then segregated South Africa which was a step to the desegregation of athletics in that country.

== Athletic accomplishments ==
Newton had no experience in track and field as a child. In small town North Carolina, there was nothing like that. He was an unathletic, two pack a day smoker until his daughter got involved with track. He turned into a proficient Masters sprinter and high jumper, Newton was an early practitioner of the sport after turning 40 in the 1970s. He set many records even after surviving a battle with testicular cancer. He once held the World Record for the M45 400 metres and the M60 division High Jump. In 2004, he was elected into the Masters division of the National Track and Field Hall of Fame.
