= 2003 World Masters Athletics Championships =

Coordinates: 18.38698°N 65.95673°W

- Dates: 1 - 13 July 2003
- Host city: Carolina, Puerto Rico
- Venue: Pista Atletica Basilio Rodriguez
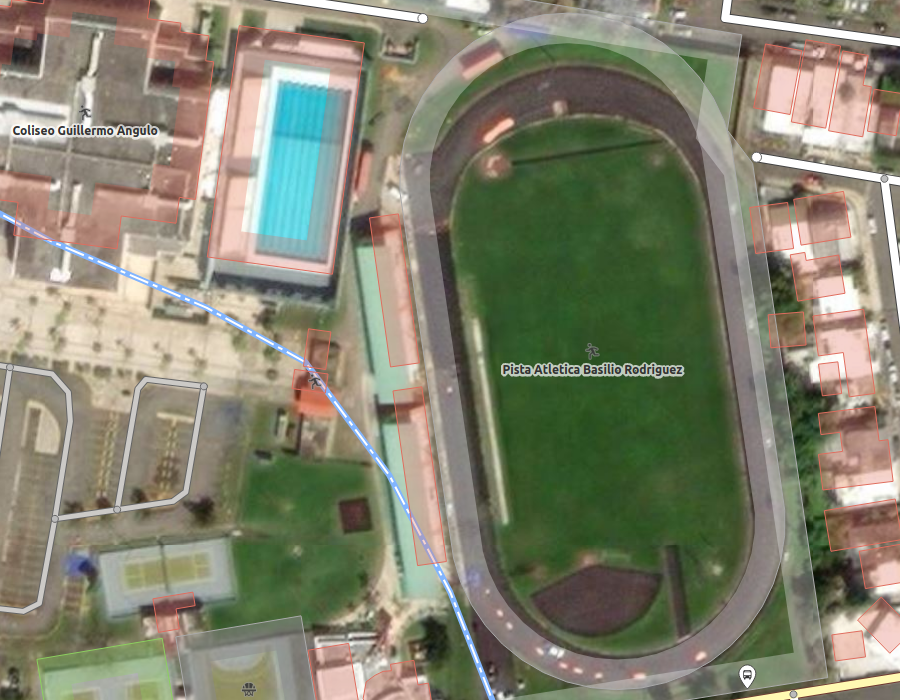
- Level: Masters
- Type: Outdoor
- Participation: 2700 athletes from 79 nations
- Official website: Archived 2003-08-07 at the Wayback Machine

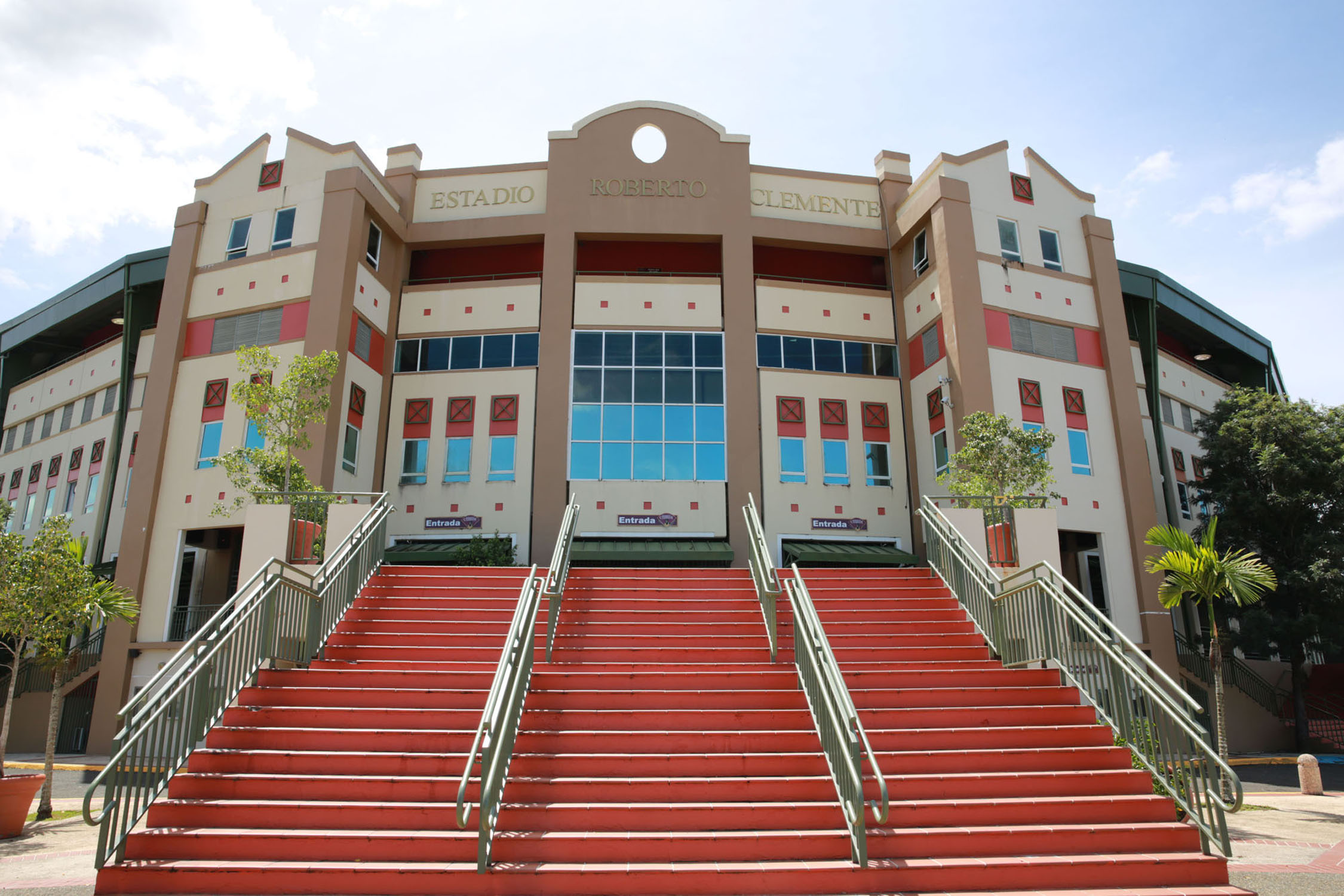
Estadio Roberto Clemente

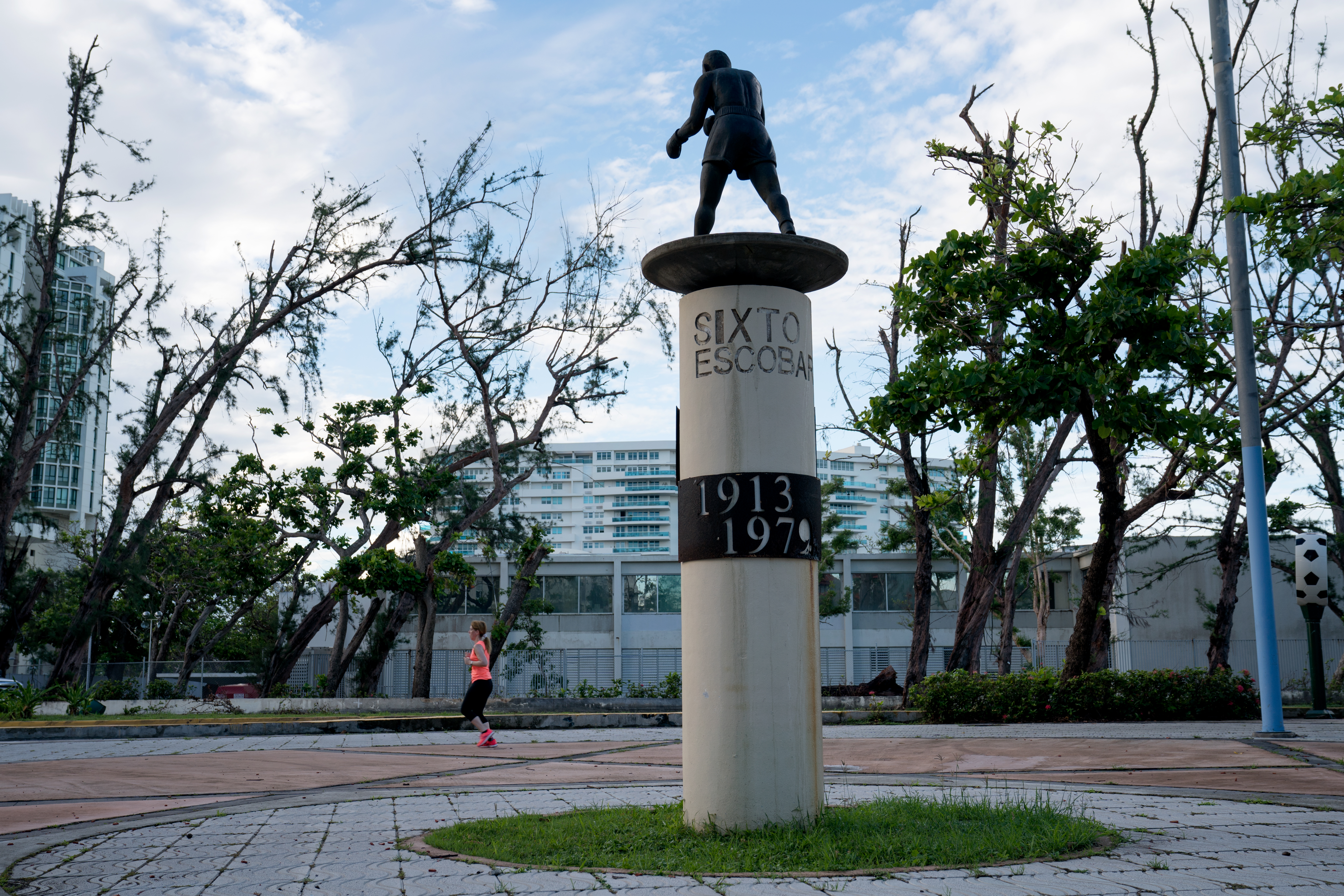
Estadio Sixto Escobar

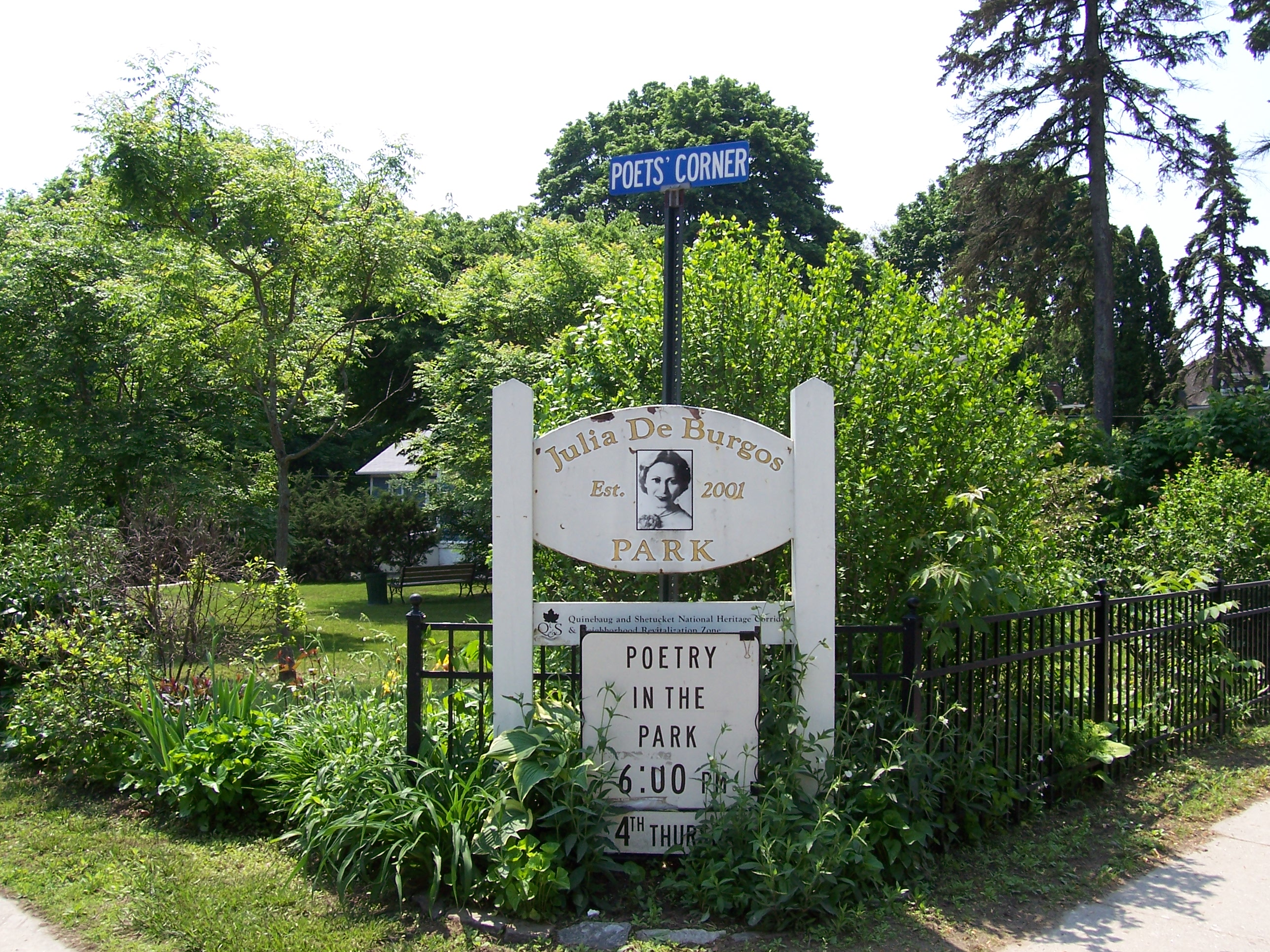
Parque Julia de Burgos

2003 World Masters Athletics Championships is the fifteenth in a series of World Masters Athletics Outdoor Championships that took place in Carolina, Puerto Rico, from 1 to 13 July 2003. The low participation number may be partly due to the fear of flying after the 2001 September 11 attacks and the 2002–2004 SARS outbreak. This is the second time that the Championships is hosted in Puerto Rico; the fifth edition of 1983 was held in San Juan. This is the first edition of the Championships conducted after the governing body of this series was formally renamed from World Association of Veteran Athletes (WAVA) to World Masters Athletics (WMA) at the previous (2001) edition held in Brisbane, Australia,

The main venue was Pista Atletica Basilio Rodriguez located within the Complejo Deportivo Municipal Roberto Clemente. Other stadia included Estadio Roberto Clemente, Estadio Sixto Escobar that had hosted the 1983 Championships in San Juan, and University of Puerto Rico Sports Complex in Río Piedras. Non-stadia venues included Central Park and Parque Julia de Burgos. The competitions were briefly interrupted by showers from Tropical Storm Claudette.

This edition of masters athletics Championships had a minimum age limit of 35 years for women and 40 years for men. During General Assembly on 10 July the starting age for men was reduced from 40 to 35 for subsequent editions. Also, the inaugural 2004 Indoor Championships was approved to be held in Sindelfingen, Germany.

This Championships was organized by WMA in coordination with a Local Organising Committee (LOC) led by William Aleman.

In addition to a full range of track and field events, non-stadia events included 8K Cross Country, 10K Race Walk (women), 20K Race Walk (men), and Marathon.

== World Records ==
A new feature for this series was the use of internet technologies: in addition to the official website, 2 additional websites provided quick updates of competition results: flashresults and cyberscoreboard.

Official daily results are archived at puertorico2003. Past Championships results are archived at WMA. Additional archives are available from Masters Athletics, from British Masters Athletic Federation in html and from Museum of Masters Track & Field in html, and as National Masters News pdf newsletters.

Several masters world records were set at this Championships. World records for 2003 are from the list of World Records in the National Masters News August newsletter unless otherwise noted.

Key: Wind aided

=== Women ===
| Event | Athlete(s) | Nationality | Performance |
|---|---|---|---|
| W90 100 Meters | Rosario Iglesias Rocha | MEX | 38.02 |
| W55 200 Meters | Ingrid Meier | GER | 27.70 |
| W90 200 Meters | Rosario Iglesias Rocha | MEX | 1:22.29 |
| W45 400 Meters | Marie Lande Mathieu | PUR | 56.15 |
| W50 800 Meters | Maureen De St Croix | CAN | 2:20.18 |
| W65 80 Meters Hurdles | Ingeborg Schott | GER | 15.01 |
| W70 80 Meters Hurdles | Hideko Koshikawa | JPN | 18.25 |
| W70 80 Meters Hurdles | Gerd Mjelde | NOR | 18.39 |
| W75 80 Meters Hurdles | Isabel Hofmeyr | RSA | 20.04 |
| W75 80 Meters Hurdles | Johnnye Valien | USA | 23.87 |
| W50 4 x 400 Meters Relay | Marne McMillan, Karla Del Grande, Rhona Trott, Maureen de St. Croix | CAN | 4:24.09 |
| W55 High Jump | Phil Raschker | USA | 1.47 |
| W60 High Jump | Erika Springmann | GER | 1.39 |
| W60 High Jump | Edith Graff | BEL | 1.39 |
| W70 High Jump | Rosemary Chrimes | GBR | 1.26 |
| W75 High Jump | Leonore McDaniels | USA | 1.11 |
| W75 Triple Jump | Leonore McDaniels | USA | 6.37 |
| W70 Shot Put | Rosemary Chrimes | GBR | 10.68 |
| W70 Discus Throw | Rosemary Chrimes | GBR | 31.29 |
| W40 Hammer throw | Oneithea Lewis | USA | 55.04 |

=== Men ===
| Event | Athlete(s) | Nationality | Performance |
|---|---|---|---|
| M100 100 Meters | Waldo McBurney | USA | 39.97 |
| M50 200 Meters | Stephen Peters | GBR | 22.58 |
| M70 200 Meters | Ralph Romain | TTO | 26.96 |
| M90 200 Meters | Friedrich Mahlo | GER | 42.14 |
| M55 400 Meters | Charles Allie | USA | 52.24 |
| M70 400 Meters | Ralph Romain | TTO | 1:01.01 |
| M75 400 Meters | Wilhem Selzer | GER | 1:05.51 |
| M90 400 Meters | Friedrich Mahlo | GER | 1:42.30 |
| M80 80 Meters Hurdles | Juji Tanaka | JPN | 16.05 |
| M40 110 Meters Hurdles | David Ashford | USA | 13.73 |
| M70 2000 Meters Steeplechase | Francisco Vicente | POR | 8:00.83 |
| M80 2000 Meters Steeplechase | Soichi Tamoi | JPN | 10:02.43 |
| M50 4 x 100 Meters Relay | Robert Bowen, Edward Gonera, Bill Collins, Jesse Norman | USA | 44.99 |
| M100 Shot Put | Waldo McBurney | USA | 4.12 |
| M90 Discus Throw | Mario Riboni | ITA | 31.29 |
| M90 Hammer throw | Mario Riboni | ITA | 20.27 |
| M90 Hammer throw | Pedro Villanueva | COL | 19.95 |
| M75 Javelin Throw | Heiner Will | GER | 42.50 |
| M90 Javelin Throw | Pedro Villanueva | COL | 16.09 |
| M85 Weight Pentathlon | Heige Lonnroth | FIN | 4275 |
| M90 Weight Pentathlon | Howard West | CAN | 3859 |
| M90 Weight Pentathlon | Anton Polgar | GER | 3442 |
| M90 Weight Pentathlon | Gilberto Gonzalez | PUR | 3287 |
| M65 Decathlon | Knut Skramstad | NOR | 7754 |
