= Charles Allie =

American masters athlete

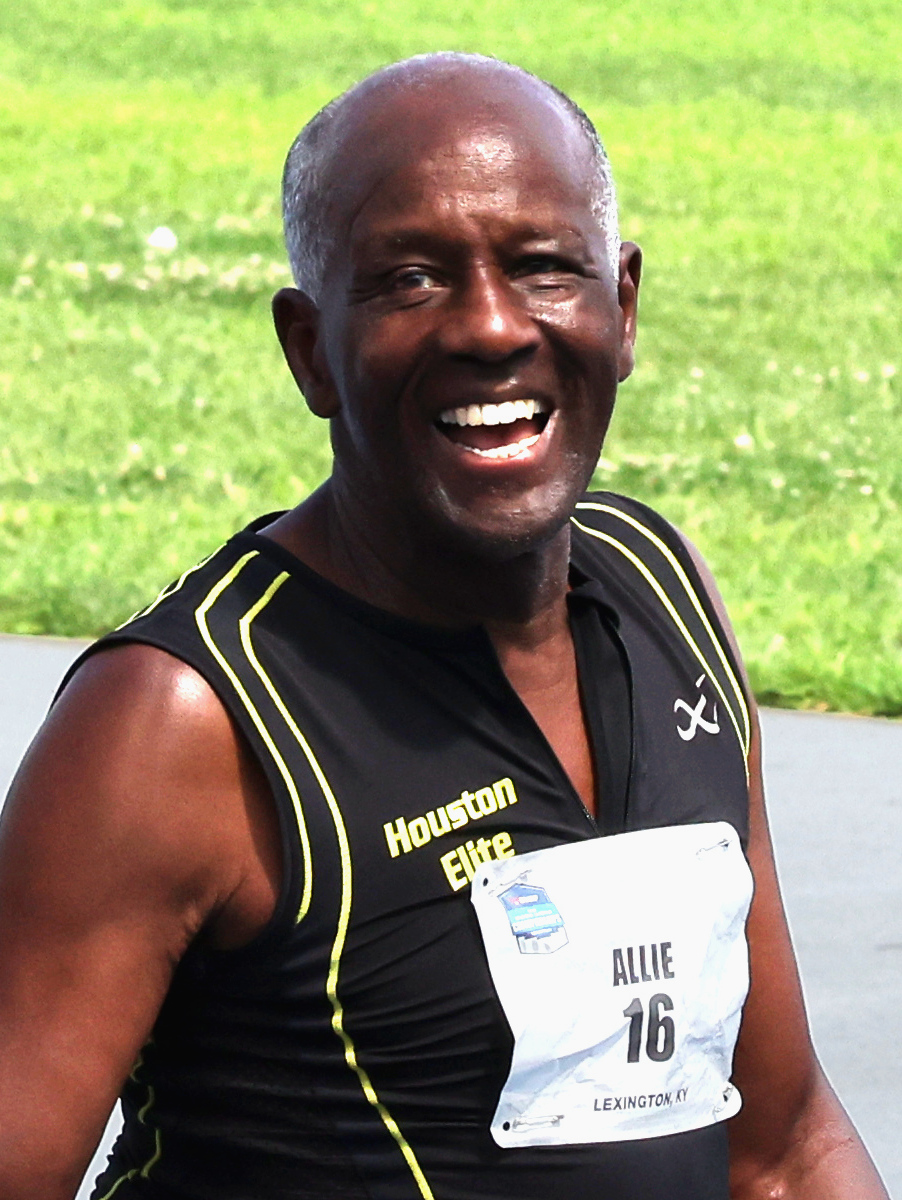
- Allie in 2022

Personal information
- Born: August 20, 1947 (age 78) Pittsburgh, Pennsylvania, US

Sport
- Country: USA
- Sport: Masters athletics
- Event: Sprints

Charles Allie (born August 20, 1947) is an American masters athletics sprinter. He has set numerous masters world records in sprint events from 200 to 400 meters.

Allie won high school city athletics championships in Pittsburgh. He attended Hampton University on a track scholarship and earned Bachelor of Science in industrial arts in 1971, then obtained Master of vocational education from University of Pittsburgh in 1978.

After retiring as an industrial arts middle school teacher, he coaches the Nadia Track Club in Pittsburgh, where he is called "Coach Buddy" and for which he was a founding member at age 40.

In November 2021, Allie was diagnosed with prostate cancer, and began receiving radiation therapy. The cancer was detected early, so he was able to return to competition fairly soon, though not in his usual competitive shape: he finished 4th in the M70 60 Meter Dash at the 2022 USATF Masters Indoor Championships on March 18 in Fort Washington Avenue Armory, New York City.

== Honors ==
- 2005 USATF Masters Hall of Fame
- 2013 IAAF-WMA Best Master of the Year
- 2018 WMA Athlete of the Year (men)
- 2018 USATF Masters Overall Athlete of the Year
- 2019 WMA Athlete of the Decade (2010–2019) nominee (male)

== Masters World records ==
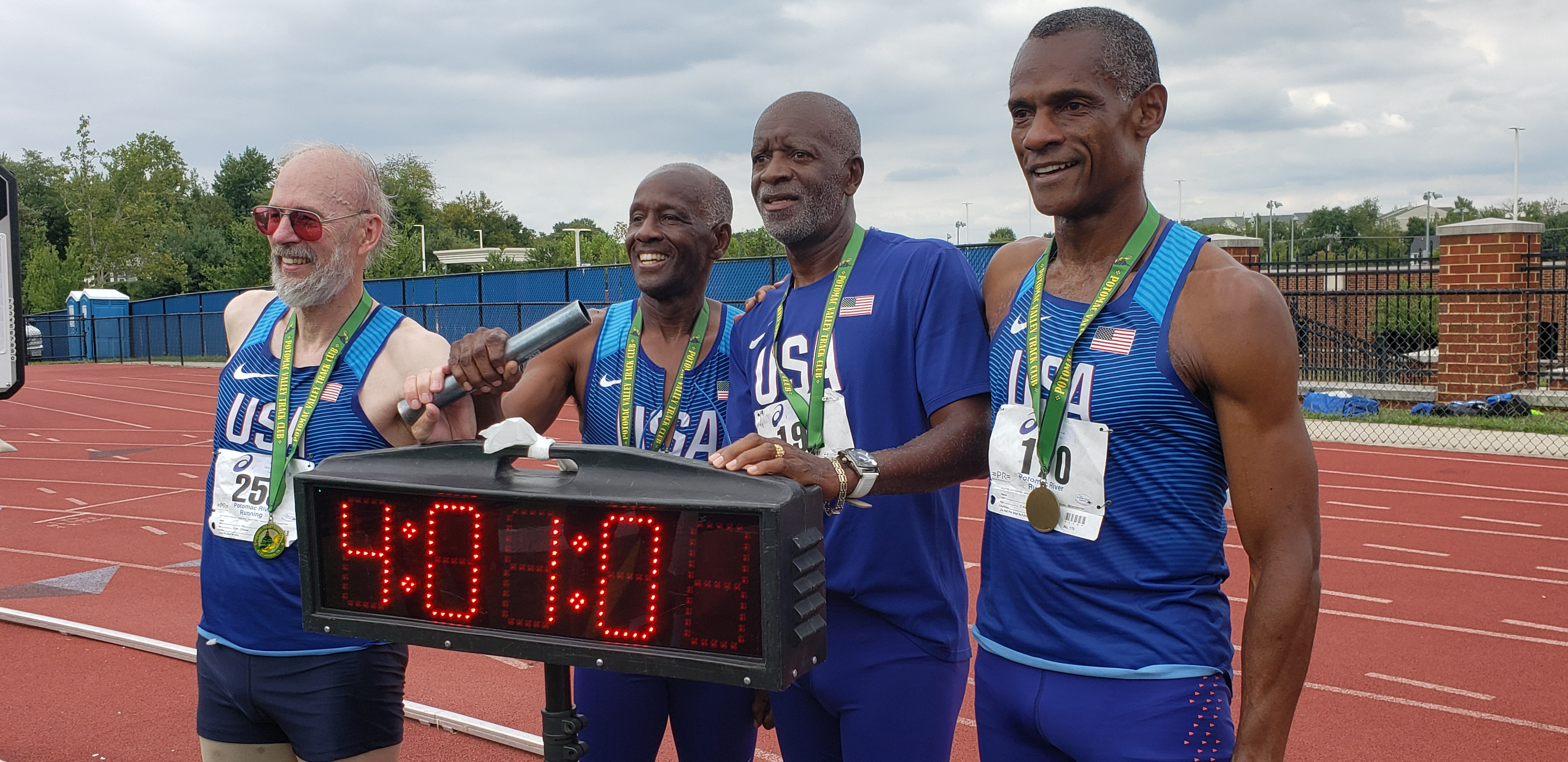
M65 4 x 400 Meters Relay 2019

World Masters Athletics (WMA) keeps the official list of current Masters WRs, both outdoor and indoor. Masters WRs set by American athletes are kept at USATF Masters.

Key: video available

=== Outdoor ===
Masters outdoor WRs are documented in list of world records in masters athletics.

Age group	Event	Competition	Location	Date	Time
M55	400 Meters	2003 World Masters Athletics Championships	Carolina, Puerto Rico	July 12, 2003	52.24
M55	4 x 400 Meters Relay; Charles Allie, George Haywood, Bill Collins, Horace Grant	Penn Relays	Philadelphia, United States	April 23, 2010	3:40.62
M60	4 x 100 Meters Relay; Ralph Peterson, Thaddeus Wilson, Charles Allie, Leo Sanders	2011 World Masters Athletics Championships	Sacramento, United States	July 17, 2011	47.93
M60	4 x 400 Meters Relay; Bill Collins, Horace Grant, George Haywood, Charles Allie	Penn Relays	Philadelphia, United States	April 26, 2013	3:51.33
M65	200 Meters	Potomac Valley Track Club	Falls Church, United States	September 1, 2012	24.85
M65	200 Meters	National Senior Games	Berea, United States	July 26, 2013	24.65
M65	400 Meters	Potomac Valley Track Club	Falls Church, United States	September 1, 2012	56.28
M65	400 Meters	Southeastern Masters	Raleigh, United States	May 18, 2013	56.09
M65	4 x 400 Meters Relay; David Ortman, Charles Allie, Thomas A. Jones, George Haywood	Potomac Valley Games	Alexandria, United States	September 1, 2019	4:01:00
M70	200 Meters	2018 USATF Open Outdoor Championships	Des Moines, United States	June 21, 2018	25.75
M70	400 Meters	2018 World Masters Athletics Championships	Málaga, Spain	September 11, 2018	57.26

=== Indoor ===
Age group	Event	Competition	Location	Date	Time
M60	200 Meters	2008 World Masters Athletics Indoor Championships; Video on YouTube	Clermont-Ferrand, France	March 19, 2008	24.95
M65	200 Meters	2013 USATF Masters Indoor Championships	Landover, United States	March 24, 2013	25.41
M65	4 x 200 Meters Relay; Charles Allie, Thaddeus Wilson, Charles Powell, Bill Collins	2017 World Masters Athletics Indoor Championships	Daegu, South Korea	March 25, 2017	1:48.58
M70	200 Meters	Imperial Dade Track Classic	New York City, United States	February 24, 2018	26.45
M70	200 Meters	2019 World Masters Athletics Indoor Championships; Video 1 on YouTube, Video 2 on YouTube, Video 3 on YouTube	Toruń, Poland	March 29, 2019	26.11
M70	400 Meters	Front Runners Invitational; Video interview	New York City, United States	March 21, 2018	59.43
M70	4 x 400 Meters Relay	Imperial Dade Track Classic	New York City, United States	February 24, 2018	4:26.15
