= 2006 World Masters Athletics Indoor Championships =

Coordinates: 48.292622°N 14.275789°E

- Dates: 15-20 March 2006
- Host city: Linz, Austria
- Venue: TipsArena Linz
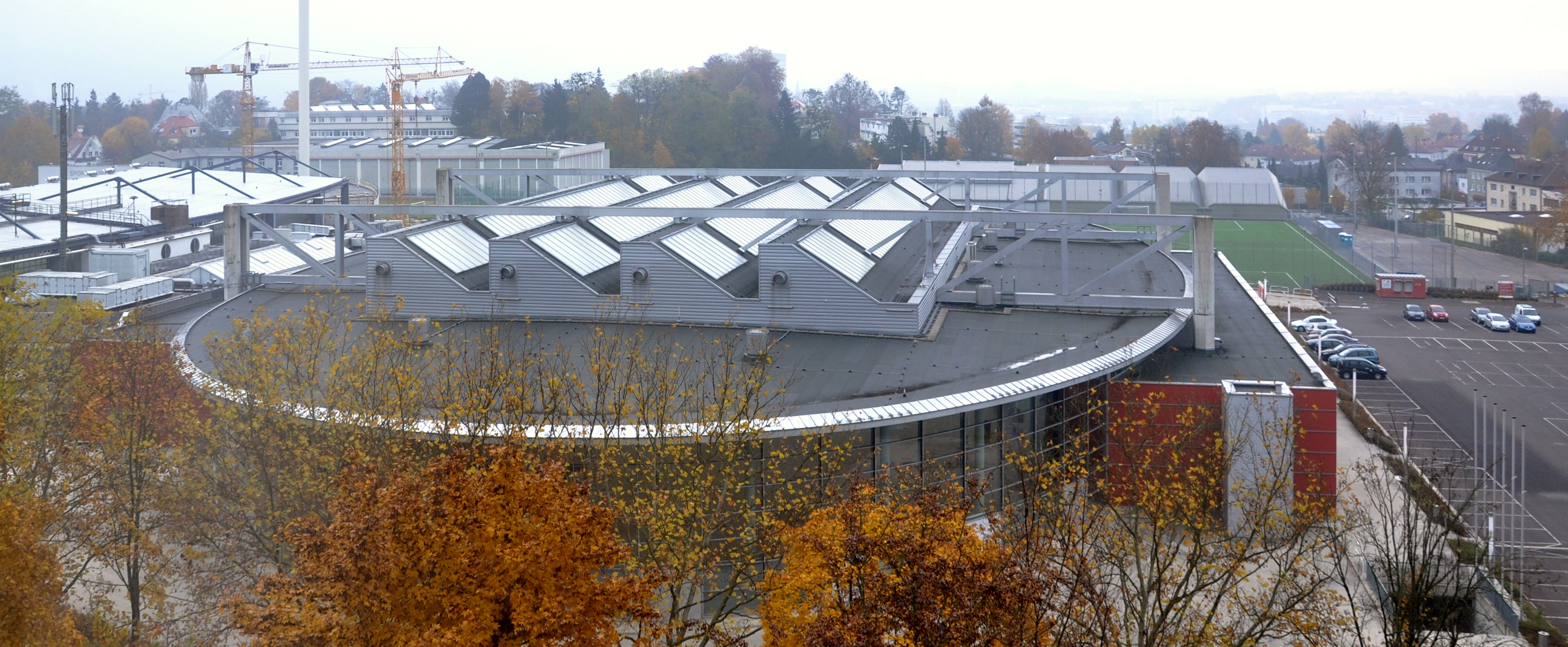
- Level: Masters
- Type: Indoor
- Participation: 3229 athletes from 62 nations
- Official website: Archived 2006-07-18 at the Wayback Machine

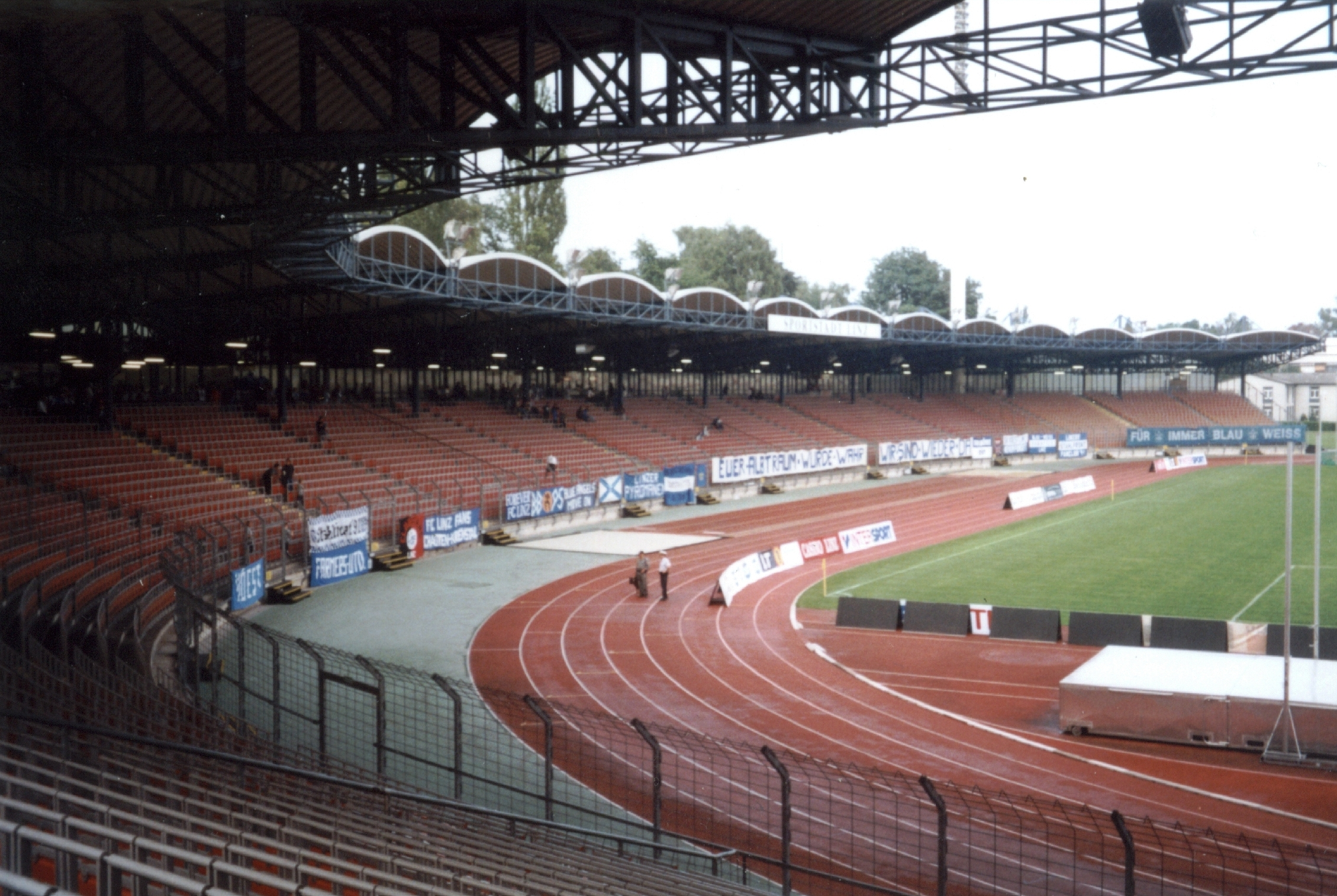
Linzer Stadion in 2002

2006 World Masters Athletics Indoor Championships is the second in a series of World Masters Athletics Indoor Championships (also called World Masters Athletics Championships Indoor, or WMACi). This second edition took place in Linz, Austria, from 15 to 20 March 2006.

The main venue was TipsArena Linz (called Intersport Arena Linz at the time), which is reputedly one of the most beautiful indoor arenas in Europe. The arena has a banked six-lane indoor track where the turns are raised to neutralize the centrifugal force of athletes running the curves. Supplemental venues included Linzer Stadion for throwing events.

This Championships was organized by World Masters Athletics (WMA) in coordination with a Local Organising Committee (LOC): Percy Hirsch, Wilhelm Koester, Brian Keaveney.

The WMA is the global governing body of the sport of athletics for athletes 35 years of age or older, setting rules for masters athletics competition.

A full range of indoor track and field events were held. In addition to indoor competition, non-stadia events included Half Marathon, 8K Cross Country, 10K Race Walk, Weight Throw, Hammer throw, Discus Throw and Javelin Throw.

== Controversy ==
A disagreement involving a potentially illegal substitution of the British M65 4 x 200m relay team caused the British record holder Anthony Treacher to be suspended by the British Masters Athletic Federation.

== World Records ==
Official results are partially archived at Linz2006. Past Championships results are archived at WMA. Additional archives are available from European Masters Athletics as a searchable pdf, from British Masters Athletic Federation as a searchable pdf, from Masters Athletics as a searchable pdf, from Museum of Masters Track & Field as a National Masters News pdf newsletter, and from Norwegian Athletics Association as a searchable pdf.

Several masters world records were set at this Indoor Championships. World records for 2006 are from infotraining.at unless otherwise noted.

=== Women ===
Event	Athlete(s)	Nationality	Performance
W40 200 Meters	Violetta Lapierre	FRA	25.29
W45 400 Meters	Marie Kay	AUS	59.16
W50 400 Meters	Karla Del Grande	CAN	61.61
W55 400 Meters	Caroline Marler	GBR	66.82
W70 800 Meters	Elfriede Hodapp	GER	3:16.59
W75 800 Meters	Melitta Czerwenka-Nagel	GER	3:31.94
W45 1500 Meters	Aurora Perez	ESP	4:43.78
W55 1500 Meters	Waltraud Egger	ITA	5:07.30
W70 1500 Meters	Elfriede Hodapp	GER	6:26.65
W75 1500 Meters	Melitta Czerwenka-Nagel	GER	6:47.94
W80 1500 Meters	Marianne Dahinden	SUI	10:11.33
W60 3000 Meters	Patricia Gallagher	GBR	11:42.68
W65 3000 Meters	Rona Frederiks	GER	12:20.09
W70 3000 Meters	Mary Anstey	GBR	13:22.96
W40 60 Meters Hurdles	Monica Pellegrinelli	SUI	8.71
W50 4 x 200 Meters Relay	Helga Schüßler, Gisela Seifert, Susanne Fritsche, Dagmar Fuhrmann	GER	1:52.95
W60 4 x 200 Meters Relay	Renate Kimmel, Edeltraud Strasdas, Gerti Reichert-Wallon, Friderun Kümmerle-Valk	GER	2:14.08
W80 High Jump	Margarete Strüven	GER	0.96
W45 Pole Vault	Brigitte Van de Kamp	NED	3.36
W80 Pole Vault	Johnnye Valien	USA	1.40
W80 Long Jump	Ingrid Lorenz	GER	2.74
W45 Triple Jump	Catherine Seillac	FRA	11.08
W80 Triple Jump	Johnnye Valien	USA	5.27
W85 Triple Jump	Mary Wixey	GBR	3.61
W50 Shot Put	Tine Schenkels	NED	14.06
W65 Shot Put	Tamara Danilova	RUS	12.00
W75 Shot Put	Rachel Hanssens	BEL	7.96

=== Men ===
Event	Athlete(s)	Nationality	Performance
M55 60 Meters	Bill Collins	USA	7.34
M55 200 Meters	Bill Collins	USA	23.36 i
M40 400 Meters	Enrico Saraceni	ITA	48.96
M90 400 Meters	Albert Olbrechts	GER	1:44.93
M40 60 Meters Hurdles	Vincent Clarico	AUT	7.85
M45 60 Meters Hurdles	Dexter McCloud	USA	8.35
M65 60 Meters Hurdles	Emil Pawlik	USA	9.57
M85 60 Meters Hurdles	Bruno Sobrero	AUT	13.16
M60 4 x 200 Meters Relay	Paul Edens, Roger Pierce, Samuel Hall, Stephen P. Robbins	USA	1:44.99
M80 High Jump	Walter Hess	GER	1.30
M85 High Jump	Emmerich Zensch	AUT	1.19
M80 Long Jump	Hans Hoffmann	GER	4.05
M35 Weight Throw	Ralf Jossa	GER	19.95
M85 Pentathlon	Bruno Sobrero	ITA	3085
M35 Half Marathon	Paul Freary	GBR	1:08:21
