= 2010 World Masters Athletics Indoor Championships =

Coordinates: 50.668611°N 120.365°W

- Dates: 2-7 March 2010
- Host city: Kamloops, Canada
- Venue: Tournament Capital Centre
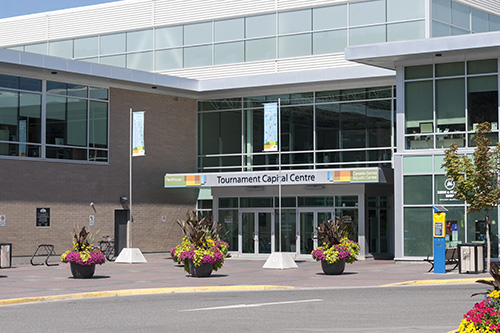
- Level: Masters
- Type: Indoor
- Participation: 1384 athletes from 62 nations
- Official website: Archived 2010-04-17 at the Wayback Machine

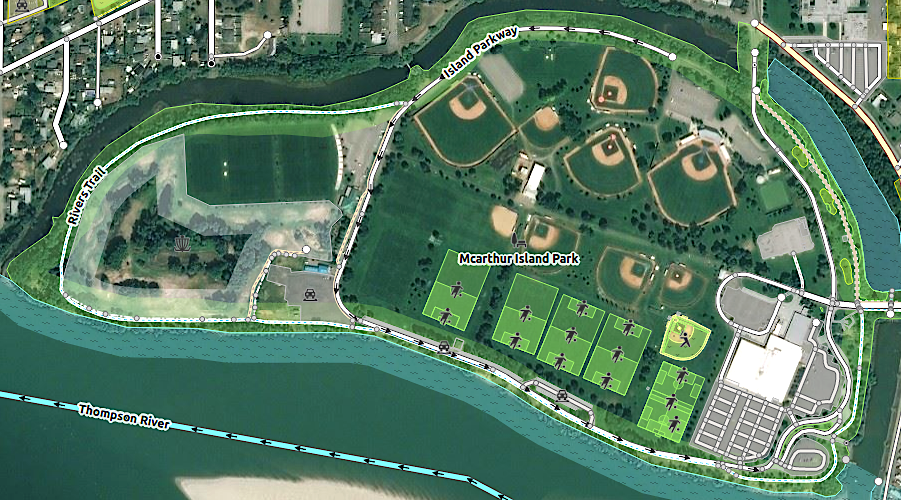
McArthur Island Park

2010 World Masters Athletics Indoor Championships is the fourth in a series of World Masters Athletics Indoor Championships (also called World Masters Athletics Championships Indoor, or WMACi). This fourth edition took place in Kamloops, Canada, from 2 to 7 March 2010. This is the first WMACi to be hosted outside of Europe.

The main venue was Tournament Capital Centre Fieldhouse, which has a flat indoor track. Supplemental venues included McArthur Island Park for Cross Country and Race Walk, and Kamloops Golf and Country Club for Half Marathon.

This Championships was organized by World Masters Athletics (WMA) in coordination with a Local Organising Committee (LOC): Judy Armstrong and Bob Cowan.

The WMA is the global governing body of the sport of athletics for athletes 35 years of age or older, setting rules for masters athletics competition.

A full range of indoor track and field events were held. In addition to indoor competition, non-stadia events included Half Marathon, 8K Cross Country, 10K Race Walk, Weight Throw, Hammer throw, Discus Throw and Javelin Throw.

== World Records ==
Official results are archived at kamloops2010masters. Past Championships results are archived at WMA. Additional archives are available from European Masters Athletics as a pdf book, from British Masters Athletic Federation in HTML format, and from Masters Athletics in HTML format. USATF Masters keeps a list of American world record holders.

Several masters world records were set at this Indoor Championships. World records for 2010 are from kamloops2010masters unless otherwise noted.

The "8000 Meter Run" published in the result archives should actually be "8K Cross Country", so the world records listed for the 8K may have been incorrectly recorded, and none of these records are documented in List of masters world records in road running. A similar clerical error is in 2015 World Masters Athletics Championships. The Half Marathon records may also be clerical errors, as every age group winner was reported as setting a world record.

=== Women ===
Event	Athlete(s)	Nationality	Performance
W90 60 Meters	Olga Kotelko	CAN	15.14
W90 200 Meters	Olga Kotelko	CAN	1:00.72
W80 3000 Meters	Zdenka Kirsch	GER	19:07.34
W35 8K Cross Country	Cynthia Wonham	CAN	33:42.90
W40 8K Cross Country	Rosa Maria Oliveira	POR	31:26.40
W45 8K Cross Country	Sheryl R. Miller	USA	32:16.60
W50 8K Cross Country	Heather Price	CAN	34:07.80
W55 8K Cross Country	Kathryn Martin	USA	32:27.60
W60 8K Cross Country	Ma De Los Angeles Rivera	MEX	43:49.60
W65 8K Cross Country	Shirley Gray	CAN	42:35.40
W70 8K Cross Country	Zofia Turosz	POL	44:07.70
W75 8K Cross Country	Erika Krueger	GER	59:10.90
W80 8K Cross Country	Zdenka Kirsch	GER	1:00:12.60
W90 High Jump	Olga Kotelko	CAN	0.77
W90 Long Jump	Olga Kotelko	CAN	1.67
W90 Triple Jump	Olga Kotelko	CAN	4.14
W80 Shot Put	Rachel Hanssens	BEL	7.15
W90 Shot Put	Olga Kotelko	CAN	4.90
W90 Hammer throw	Olga Kotelko	CAN	13.92
W50 Weight Throw	Ulrike Engelhardt	GER	15.59
W75 Weight Throw	Galina Kovalenskaya	RUS	10.25
W80 Weight Throw	Rachel Hanssens	BEL	8.01
W90 Weight Throw	Olga Kotelko	CAN	6.32
W90 Javelin Throw	Olga Kotelko	CAN	12.45
W75 60 Meters Hurdles	Christel Donley	USA	14.22
W50 Pentathlon	Marie Kay	AUS	4906
W60 3000 Meters Race Walk	Heather Carr	AUS	15:54.75
W35 Half Marathon	Maureen Renwick	CAN	1:49:00.60
W40 Half Marathon	Soledad Castro Soliño	ESP	1:23:09.10
W45 Half Marathon	Piedad Rodriguez	ESP	1:28:12.80
W50 Half Marathon	Cindy Rhodes	CAN	1:27:53.30
W55 Half Marathon	Diane McKelvey	CAN	1:50:17.70
W60 Half Marathon	Mary Simmonds	CAN	2:00:57.50
W65 Half Marathon	Shirley Gray	CAN	1:51:41.00
W70 Half Marathon	Zofia Turosz	POL	1:59:34.50
W75 Half Marathon	Erika Krueger	GER	2:28:43.60
W80 Half Marathon	Zdenka Kirsch	GER	2:40:38.10
W80 4 x 200 Meters Relay	Louise Sorensen, Hildegard Buschhaus, Olga Kotelko, Leona Smith	CAN	4:15.33

=== Men ===
Event	Athlete(s)	Nationality	Performance
M45 60 Meters	Aaron Thigpen on YouTube, another video on YouTube	USA	7.02
M90 200 Meters	Ugo Sansonetti	ITA	41.13
M75 400 Meters	William Clark	USA	1:27.74
M90 400 Meters	Ugo Sansonetti	ITA	1:46.78
M35 8K Cross Country	Jose Ramon Arredondo Perez	ESP	24:45.90
M40 8K Cross Country	Elarbi Khattabi	MAR	24:09.00
M45 8K Cross Country	Simon R. Anderson	GBR	25:03.50
M50 8K Cross Country	David Cannon	USA	24:55.50
M55 8K Cross Country	Simon Martin	GBR	29:57.20
M60 8K Cross Country	Roger Price	USA	32:02.00
M65 8K Cross Country	Jose Antonio Arias De La Cruz	ESP	32:47.00
M70 8K Cross Country	Klemens Wittig	GER	35:06.90
M75 8K Cross Country	Lewis Butcher	CAN	52:02.60
M80 8K Cross Country	Grant Yule	CAN	53:15.30
M90 High Jump	Emmerich Zensch	AUT	1.07
M60 Pole Vault	John Altendorf on YouTube	USA	4.05 i
M45 Pentathlon	Christopher Bates	USA	4110
M35 Half Marathon	Steve J. Hallas	GBR	1:19:10.80
M40 Half Marathon	Donald King	CAN	1:13:39.30
M45 Half Marathon	Don Young	USA	1:17:30.20
M50 Half Marathon	Jose Navarro	ESP	1:14:55.10
M55 Half Marathon	Oeyvind Trongmo	NOR	1:17:20.00
M60 Half Marathon	Richard J. Evans	GBR	1:27:13.70
M65 Half Marathon	Jose Antonio Arias De La Cruz	ESP	1:28:05.50
M70 Half Marathon	Klemens Wittig	GER	1:33:37.50
M80 Half Marathon	Grant Yule	CAN	2:31:01.80
M60 10K Race Walk	Ludwig M. Niestelberger	AUT	53:45.20
M80 4 x 200 Meters Relay	Bill Thompson, Isaac Thiessen, Harry Thompson, Norm Lesage	CAN	2:40.99
