= 2009 World Masters Athletics Championships =

Coordinates: 60.983056°N 25.634167°E

- Dates: 28 July - 8 August 2009
- Host city: Lahti, Finland
- Venue: Lahden Stadion
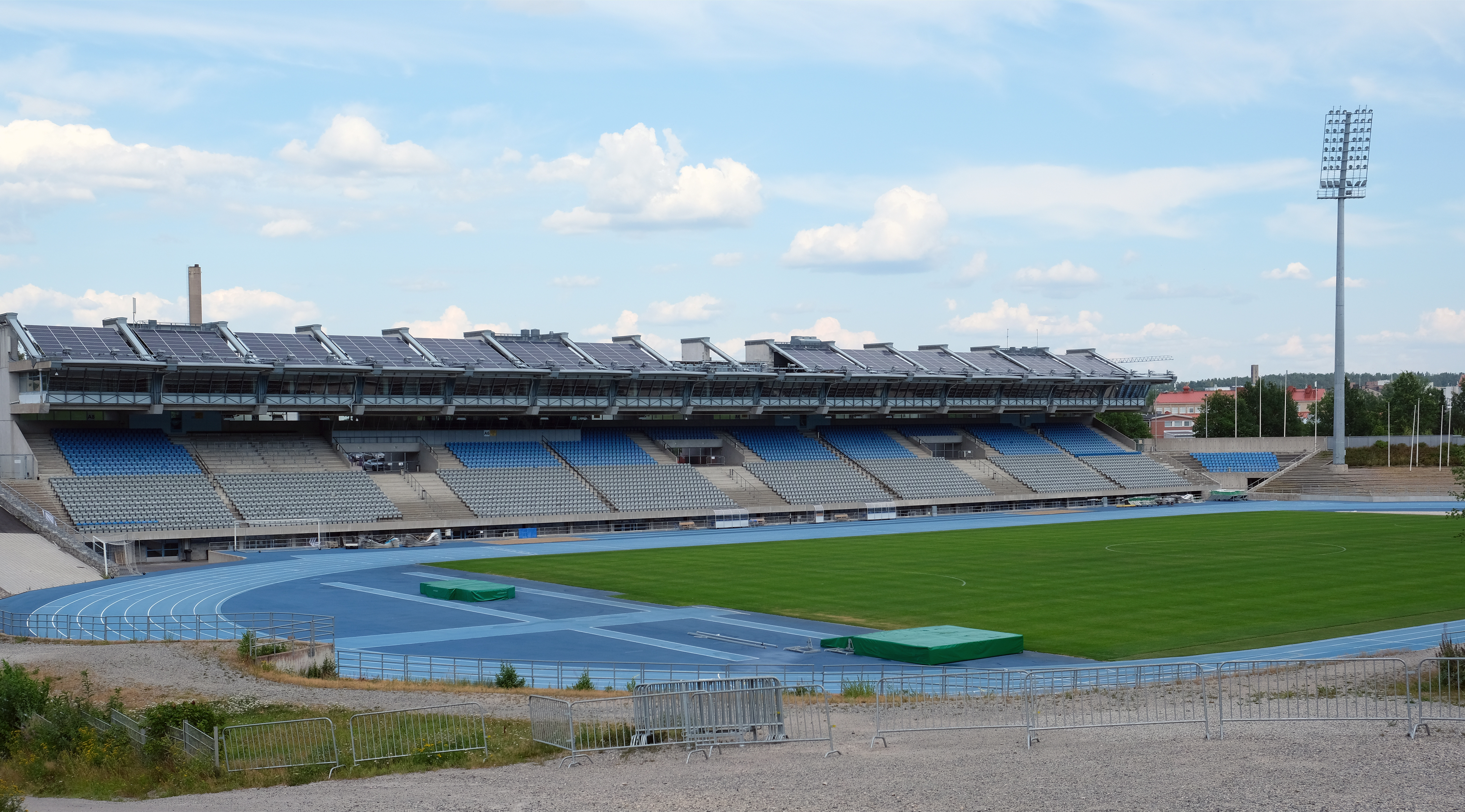
- Level: Masters
- Type: Outdoor
- Participation: 4948 athletes from 96 nations
- Official website: Archived 2010-05-26 at the Wayback Machine

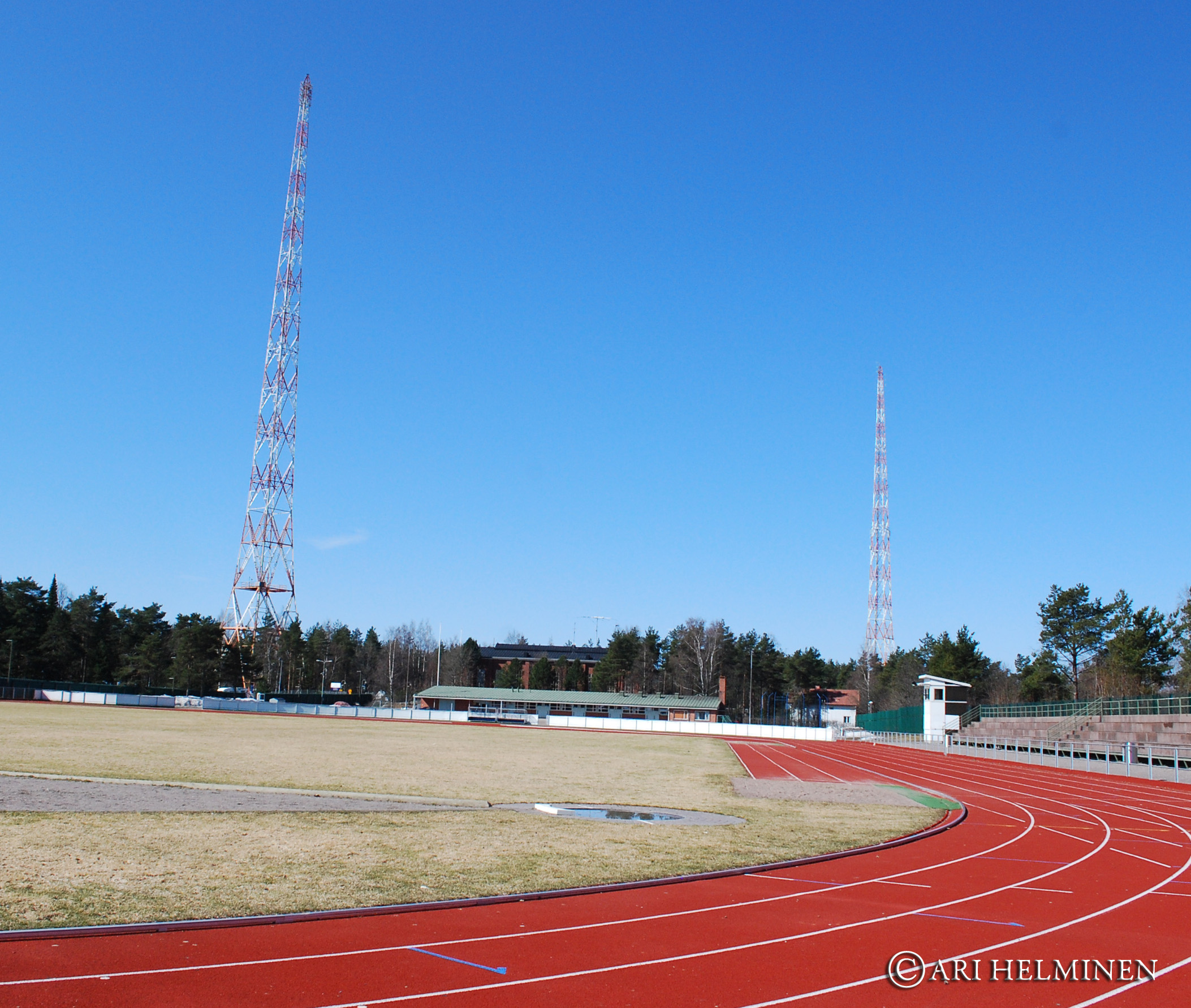
Radiomäen urheilukenttä

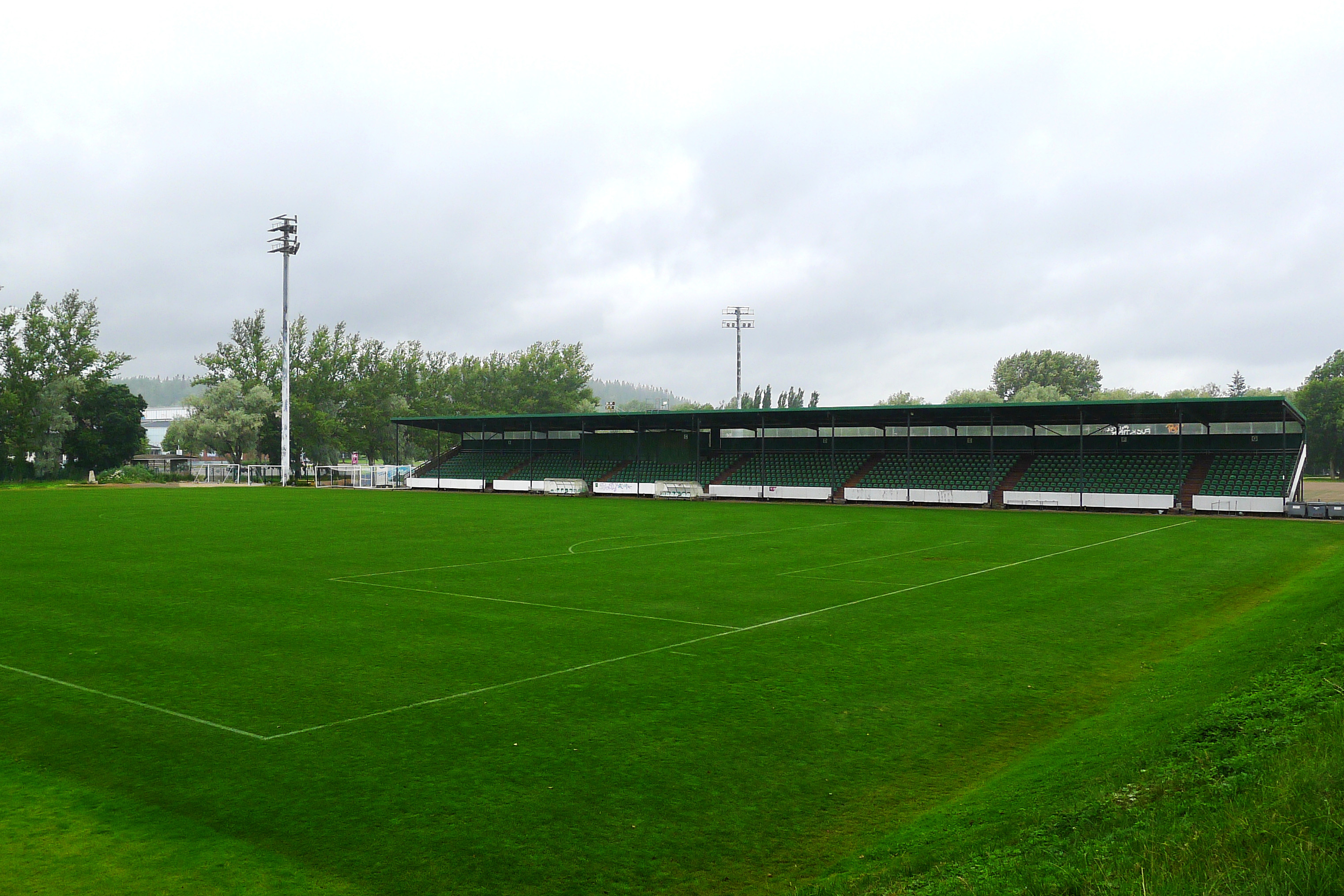
Lahden kisapuisto

2009 World Masters Athletics Championships is the eighteenth in a series of World Masters Athletics Outdoor Championships that took place in Lahti, Finland from 28 July to 8 August 2009.

The main venue was Lahden Stadion located within Lahden Urheilukeskus. Supplemental venues included Radiomäen urheilukenttä in Radiomäki, Nastola Sport Field, Kisapuisto Field for throwing events, and Fellmaninpuisto for start and finish of the Marathon.

This Championships was organized by World Masters Athletics (WMA) in coordination with a Local Organising Committee (LOC): Virpi Hurri, Hannu Nurminen, Pekka Mäki-Reinikka.

The WMA is the global governing body of the sport of athletics for athletes 35 years of age or older, setting rules for masters athletics competition.

In addition to a full range of track and field events, non-stadia events included 8K Cross Country, 10K Race Walk (women), 20K Race Walk (men), and Marathon.

== World Records ==
Past Championships results are archived at WMA; the 2009 results are available as a searchable pdf. Additional archives are available from British Masters Athletic Federation as a searchable pdf, from European Masters Athletics as a searchable pdf and from Museum of Masters Track & Field as a searchable pdf.

Masters world records set at this Championships are listed below.

=== Women ===
Event	Athlete(s)	Nationality	Performance
W90 200 Meters	Olga Kotelko	CAN	56.46
W55 400 Meters	Caroline Powell	GBR	1:01.90
W55 400 Meters	Joylyn Saunders-Mullins	GBR	1:02.34
W40 4 x 100 Meters Relay	Gianna Mogentale, Julie Brims, Jacqualine Bezuidenhout, Kylie Strong	AUS	48.01
W50 4 x 400 Meters Relay	Laura Mahady, Jane Horder, Joylyn Saunders-Mullins, Caroline Powell	GBR	4:10.80
W70 Triple Jump	Christiane Schmalbruch	GER	8.65
W90 High Jump	Olga Kotelko	CAN	0.82
W50 Shot Put	Alexandra Marghieva	MDA	15.15
W70 Discus Throw	Tamara Danilova	RUS	33.80
W90 Discus Throw	Olga Kotelko	CAN	14.80
W70 Javelin Throw	Evaun Williams	GBR	33.73
W90 Throws Pentathlon	Olga Kotelko	CAN	5905

=== Men ===
Event	Athlete(s)	Nationality	Performance
M90 100 Meters	Ugo Sansonetti	ITA	17.82
M70 400 Meters	Guido Müller	GER	59.34
M90 400 Meters	Ugo Sansonetti	ITA	1:35.04
M90 800 Meters	Holger Josefsson	SWE	4:04.85
M90 1500 Meters	Holger Josefsson	SWE	8:07.17
M65 100 Meters Hurdles	Rolf Geese	GER	15.47
M85 80 Meters Hurdles	Hugo Delgado	PER	18.27
M70 4 x 400 Meters Relay	Willi Scheidt, Adolf Nehren, Willi Klaus, Guido Müller	GER	4:17.47
