= 2019 World Masters Athletics Indoor Championships =

Coordinates: 53.0177491°N 18.5866731°E

- Dates: 24-30 March 2019
- Host city: Toruń, Poland
- Venue: Arena Toruń
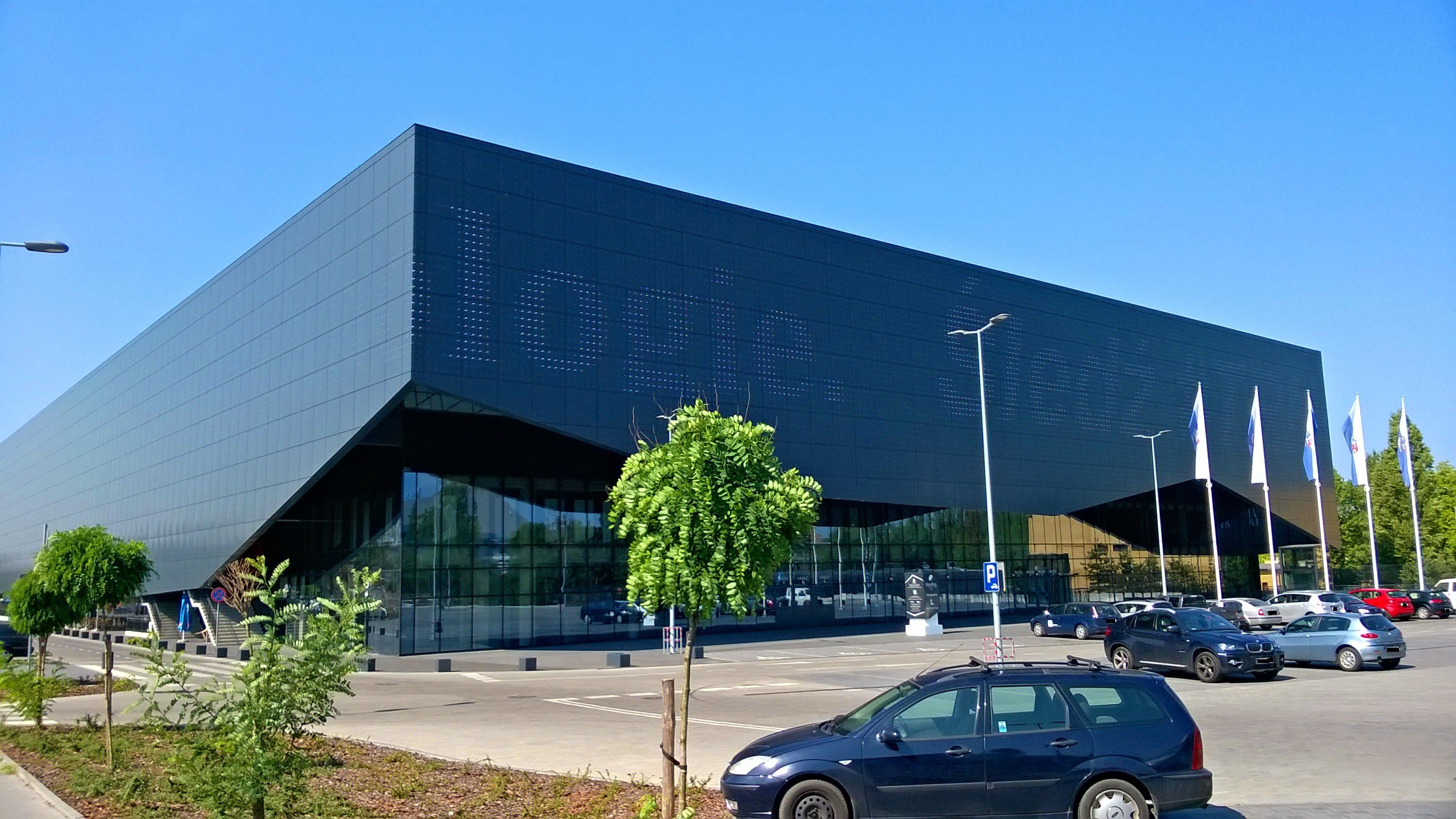
- Level: Masters
- Type: Indoor
- Participation: 4364 athletes from 74 nations
- Official website: Archived 2019-07-03 at the Wayback Machine

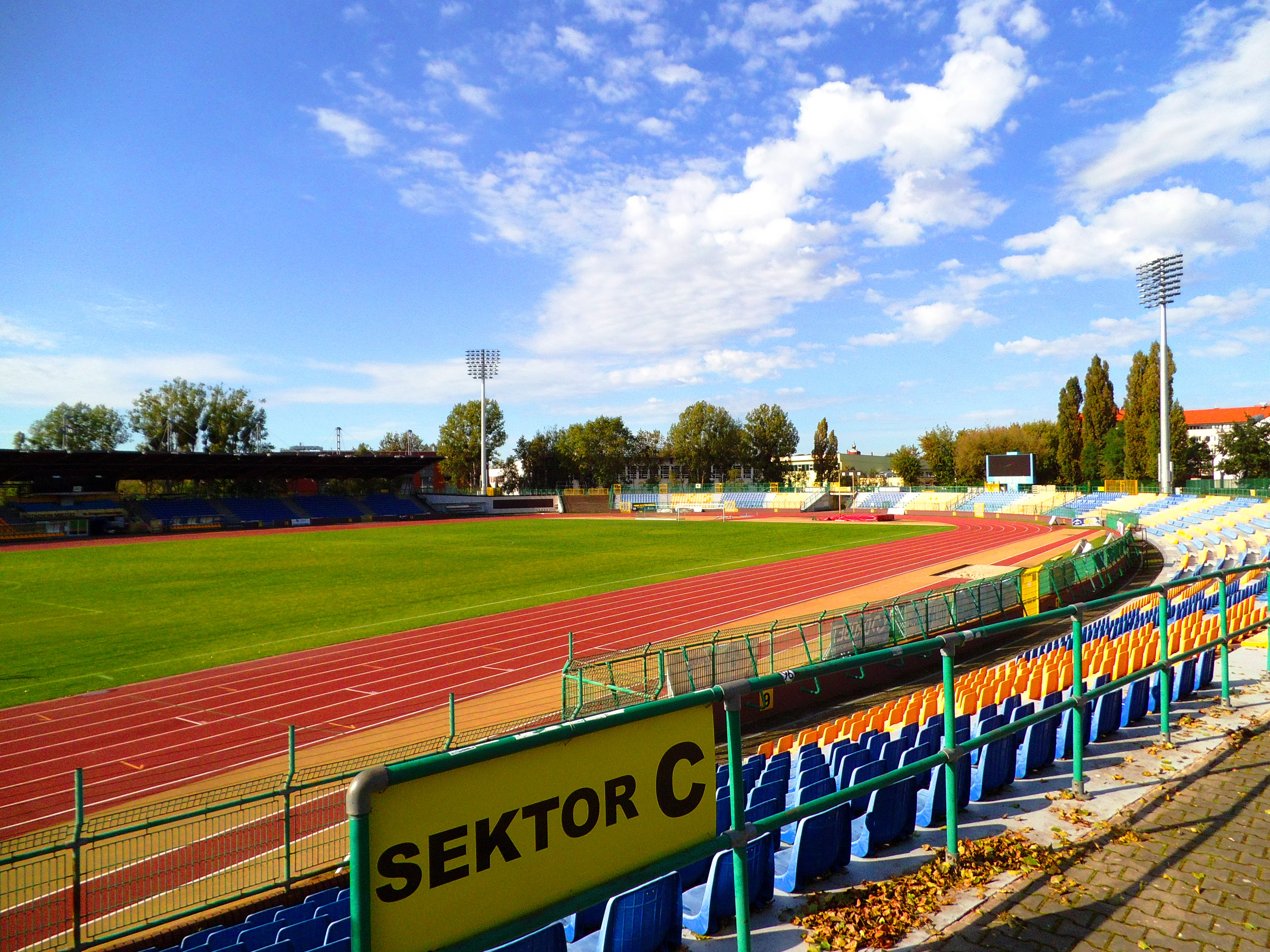
Municipal Stadium

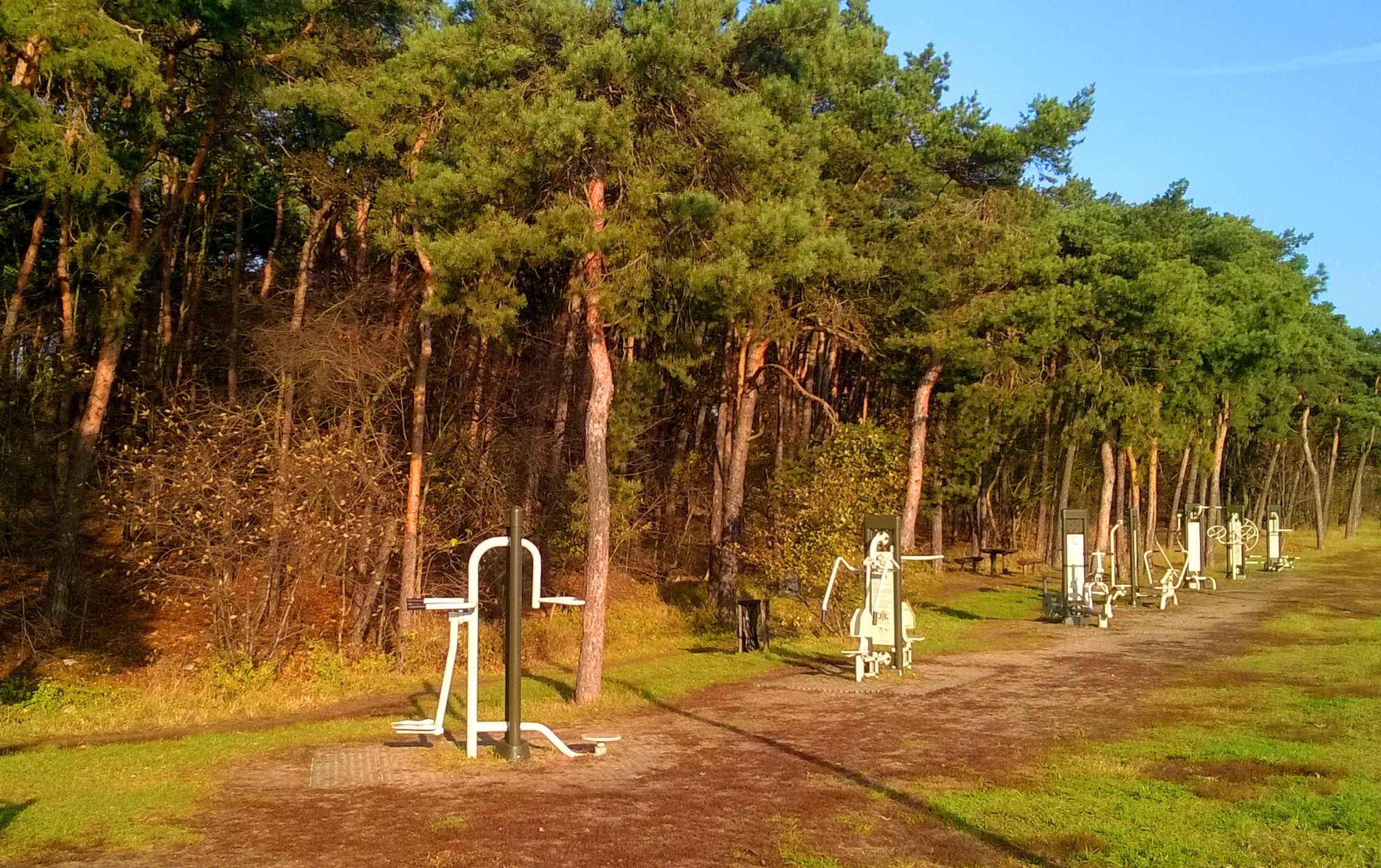
Rudelka Park

2019 World Masters Athletics Indoor Championships is the eighth in a series of World Masters Athletics Indoor Championships (also called World Masters Athletics Championships Indoor, or WMACi). This eighth edition took place in Toruń, Poland, from 24 to 30 March 2019.

The main venue was Arena Toruń, which has a banked six-lane indoor track where the turns are raised to neutralize the centrifugal force of athletes running the curves. Supplemental venues included Municipal Stadium for throws, and Rudelka Park for Cross Country.

This Championships was organized by World Masters Athletics (WMA) in coordination with a Local Organising Committee (LOC): Sandy Pashkin, Brian Keaveney, Wackaw Krankowski.

The WMA is the global governing body of the sport of athletics for athletes 35 years of age or older, setting rules for masters athletics competition.

A full range of indoor track and field events were held. In addition to indoor competition, non-stadia events included Half Marathon, 8K Cross Country, 10K Race Walk, 10K Road Race, Weight Throw, Hammer throw, Discus Throw and Javelin Throw.

== World Records ==
Official daily results are archived at domtel-sport.pl. Past Championships results are archived at WMA. as a searchable pdf. Additional archives are available from European Masters Athletics as a searchable pdf, USATF Masters keeps a list of American record holders. wmaci2023, the site that hosts the next (ninth) edition of the series (also in Toruń), publishes a list of world records set at the eighth edition.

Several masters world records were set at this Indoor Championships. World records for 2019 are from the list of World Records in the European Masters Athletics searchable pdf unless otherwise noted.

=== Women ===
Event	Athlete(s)	Nationality	Performance
W35 800 Meters	Aneta Lemiesz, Alina Stepanchuk (GBR)	POL	2:10.12
W85 60 Meters	Irene Obera on YouTube	USA	12.28
W65 200 Meters	Karla Del Grande on YouTube	CAN	29.73
W85 200 Meters	Irene Obera on YouTube	USA	44.18
W55 800 Meters	Virginia Mitchell on YouTube	GBR	2:22:34
W65 400 Meters	Karla Del Grande on YouTube	CAN	1:08.39
W85 400 Meters	Emma Maria Mazzenga on YouTube	ITA	1:51.89
W70 800 Meters	Sabra Harvey on YouTube	USA	2:50.57
W55 60 Meters Hurdles	Neringa Jakstiene	USA	9.48
W75 60 Meters Hurdles	Riet Jonkers-Slegers	NED	13.17
W85 60 Meters Hurdles	Irene Obera	USA	24.06
W35 4 x 200 Meters Relay	Malgorzata Gasowska, Joanna Balcerzak, Aneta Lemiesz, Aneta Grot	POL	1:42.53
W75 4 x 200 Meters Relay	Lydia Ritter, Anne-Kathrin Eriksen, Helga Glatzki, Hannelore Venn	GER	2:50.72
W80 4 x 200 Meters Relay	Irene Obera, Carolyn Langenwalter, Florence Meiler, Rose Green	USA	3:18.43
W45 High jump	Alison Wood	USA	1.67
W50 High jump	Petra Koliwer	GER	1.58
W50 High jump	Petra Bajeat	FRA	1.55
W50 Long Jump	Petra Bajeat	FRA	5.57
W55 Long Jump	Neringa Jakstiene	USA	5.22
W60 Long Jump	Maria Rosa Escribano Checa	ESP	4.58
W80 Long Jump	Christa Bortignon	CAN	3.28
W55 Triple Jump	Neringa Jakstiene	USA	11.09
W50 Pole Vault	Irie Hill	GBR	3.51
W65 Shot Put	Mihaela Loghin	ROU	12.18
W80 Weight Throw	Evaun Williams	GBR	12.75
W80 Javelin Throw	Evaun Williams	GBR	27.51
W50 Pentathlon	Petra Bajeat	FRA	4900
W60 Pentathlon	Maria Rosa Escribano Checa	ESP	4648
W75 Pentathlon	Riet Jonkers-Slegers	NED	4987
W90 3000 Meters Race Walk	Elena Pagu	ROU	27:27.78
W40 Half Marathon	Dawn Grunnagle	USA	1:16:25
W70 Half Marathon	Marta Mikolajczyk	POL	1:38:53

=== Men ===
Event	Athlete(s)	Nationality	Performance
M95 60 Meters	Pekka Penttilä on YouTube	FIN	14.09
M70 200 Meters	Charles Allie on YouTube, video 2 on YouTube, video 3 on YouTube	USA	26.11
M85 400 Meters	Radnaa Tseren on YouTube	MNG	1:20.65
M90 400 Meters	Marcos Bermejo Garcia on YouTube	ESP	1:43.08
M60 3000 Meters	Sergey Polikarpov on YouTube	KAZ	9:43.11
M40 4 x 200 Meters Relay	Dominic Bradley, Brett Rund, Richard Beardsell, Tamunonengiye-Ofori Ossai	GBR	1:30.97
M55 4 x 200 Meters Relay	Charly Perochon, Francois Bontemps, Patrick Barbier, Patrice Carnier on YouTube	FRA	1:39.40
M65 4 x 200 Meters Relay	Charles Allie, Thomas Jones, Thaddeus Wilson, George Haywood	USA	1:47.29
M75 Pentathlon	Rolf Geese	GER	4443
M80 Pentathlon	Willi Klaus	GER	4540
M70 3000 Meters Race Walk	Ian Richards	GBR	15:19.64
M90 3000 Meters Race Walk	Viljo Hyvölä	FIN	24:33.58
M75 Half Marathon	Juan Lopez Garcia	ESP	1:36:05
M80 Half Marathon	Fokke Kramer	GER	1:44:37
M90 Half Marathon	Angelo Squadrone	ITA	3:20:30
