= 2004 World Masters Athletics Indoor Championships =

Coordinates: 48.715955°N 8.983662°E

- Dates: 10-14 March 2004
- Host city: Sindelfingen, Germany
- Venue: Glaspalast Sindelfingen
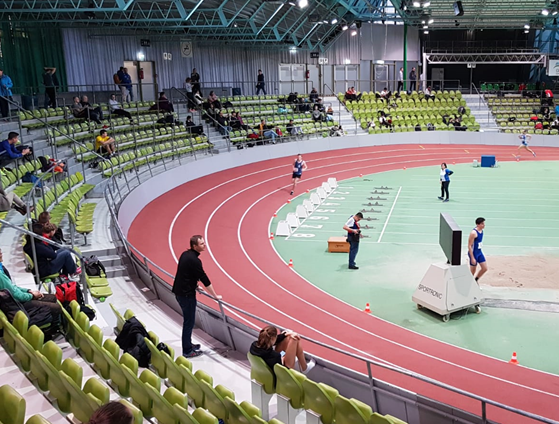
- Level: Masters
- Type: Indoor
- Participation: 2638 athletes from 58 nations
- Official website: Archived 2004-06-13 at the Wayback Machine

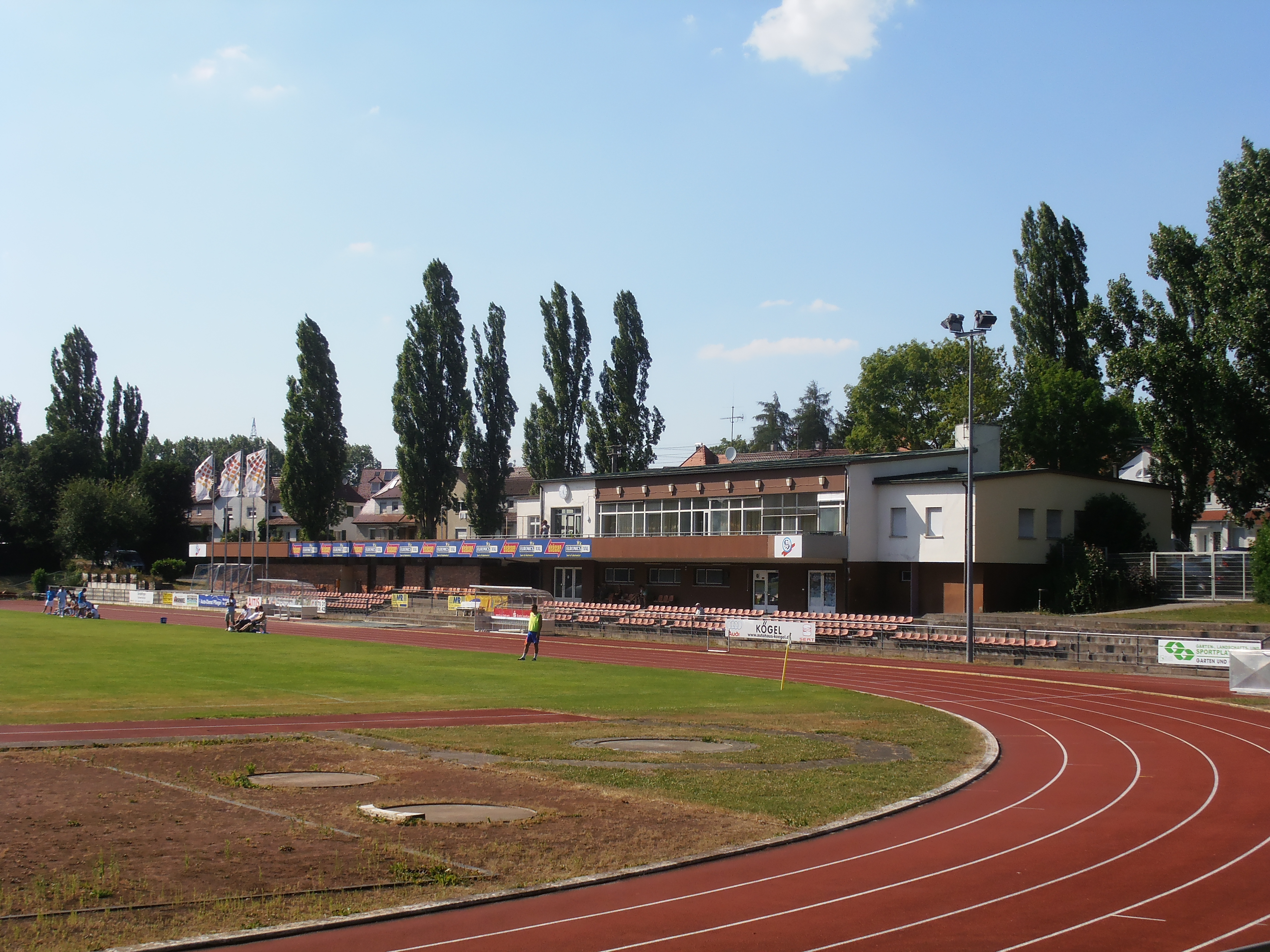
Floschenstadion

2004 World Masters Athletics Indoor Championships is the first in a series of World Masters Athletics Indoor Championships (also called World Masters Athletics Championships Indoor, or WMACi) that were held following the success of both stadia and non-stadia World Masters Athletics Outdoor Championships, This inaugural WMA Indoor Championships took place in Sindelfingen, Germany, from 10 to 14 March 2004.

The main venue was Glaspalast Sindelfingen, which has a banked four-lane indoor track, where the turns are raised to neutralize the centrifugal force of athletes running the curves. Supplemental venues included Floschenstadion for throwing events and the tennis hall in Sportwelt VfL Sindelfingen for warming-up purposes.

This Championships was organized by World Masters Athletics (WMA) in coordination with a Local Organising Committee (LOC) of the German Athletics Association (German: Deutscher Leichtathletik-Verband, DLV) and Karl-Heinrich Lebherz.

The WMA is the global governing body of the sport of athletics for athletes 35 years of age or older, setting rules for masters athletics competition. The starting age had been 35 years for women and 40 years for men in previous editions of the Outdoor Championships, but the men minimum age was reduced to 35 at the General Assembly of the 2003 Outdoor Championships.

A full range of indoor track and field events were held. In addition to indoor competition, non-stadia events included Half Marathon, 8K Cross Country, 10K Race Walk, and Weight Throw. In addition, Hammer throw, Discus Throw and Javelin Throw were offered as exhibition non-stadia events for this inaugural Indoor Championships.

== World records ==
Official daily results are archived at sindelfingen2004. Past Championships results are archived at WMA. Additional archives are available from British Masters Athletic Federation as a searchable pdf, from Museum of Masters Track & Field as a National Masters News pdf newsletter, and from Masters Athletics in HTML format. USATF Masters keeps a list of American world record holders. German medal winners are archived at Hamburger Abendblatt and at Leichtathletik-Verband Rheinland.

Several masters world records were set at this Indoor Championships. World records for 2004 are from WMA unless otherwise noted.

=== Women ===
Event	Athlete(s)	Nationality	Performance
W40 4 x 200 Meters Relay	Anke Moritz, Brigitte Heidrich, Angelika Grissmer, Ulrike Görling	GER	1:44.34
W45 60 Meters Hurdles	Christine Müller	GER	8.79
W85 Long Jump	Olga Kotelko	CAN	1.91
W85 High Jump	Olga Kotelko	CAN	0.89 i
W40 Pole Vault	Carla Forcellini	ITA	3.60 i
W40 Pole Vault	Larissa Lowe	NED	3.60 i
W85 Shot Put	Olga Kotelko	CAN	5.81

=== Men ===
Event	Athlete(s)	Nationality	Performance
M35 200 Meters	Robert Thomas JR	USA	22.64
M65 200 Meters	Guido Müller	GER	26.05
M65 400 Meters	Guido Müller	GER	56.95
M60 60 Meters Hurdles	Courtland Gray	USA	8.85
M65 60 Meters Hurdles	Guido Müller	GER	9.60
M60 Pentathlon	Rolf Geese	GER	4409
