= Glaspalast =

Glaspalast may refer to:

- Glaspalast (Munich), Glaspalast in Munich modeled after The Crystal Palace
- Glaspalast Sindelfingen, an indoor arena in Sindelfingen
