= 2023 World Masters Athletics Indoor Championships =

Coordinates: 53.0177491°N 18.5866731°E

- Dates: 25-31 March 2023
- Host city: Toruń, Poland
- Venue: Arena Toruń
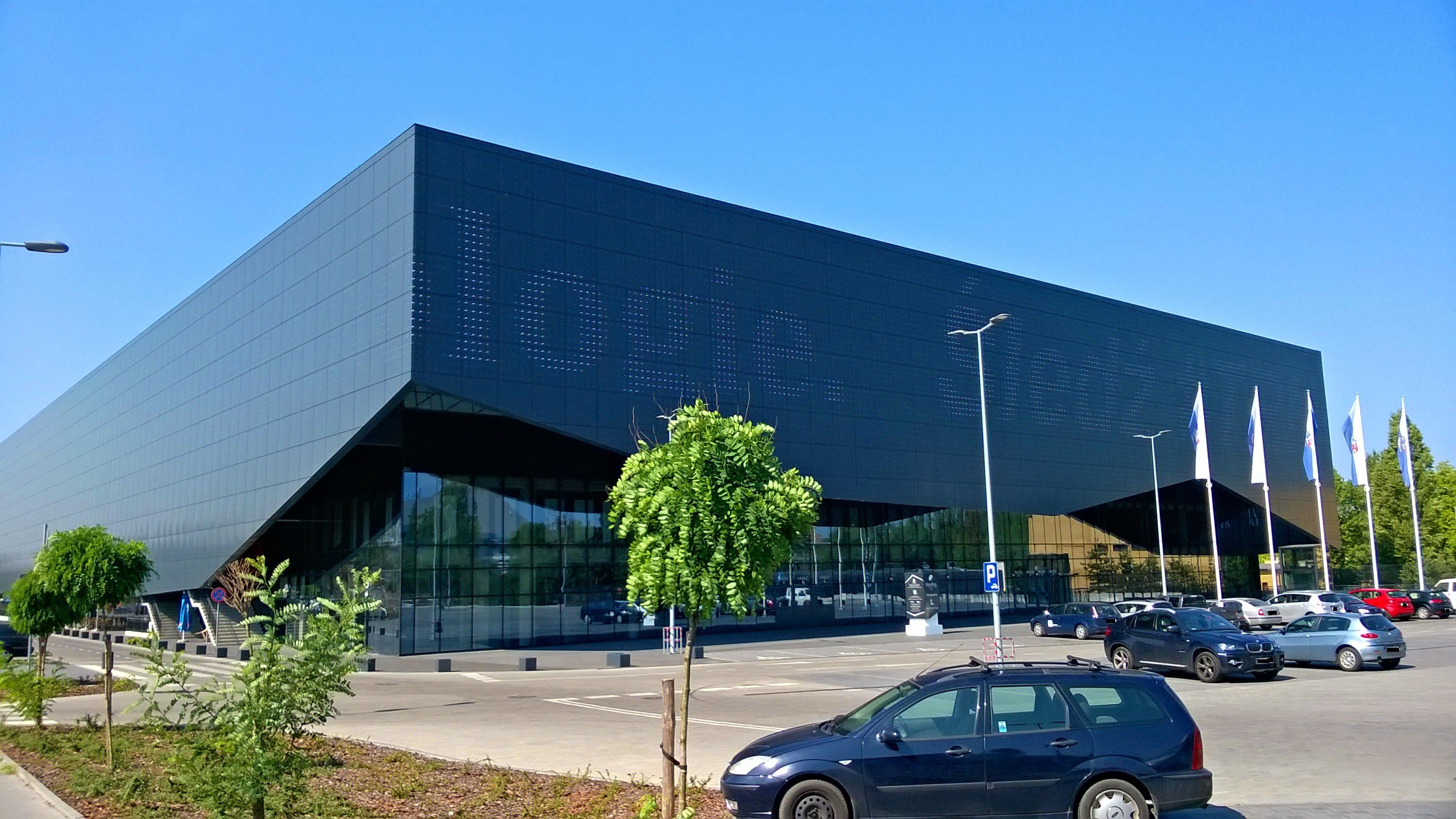
- Level: Masters
- Type: Indoor
- Official website: wmaci2023.com

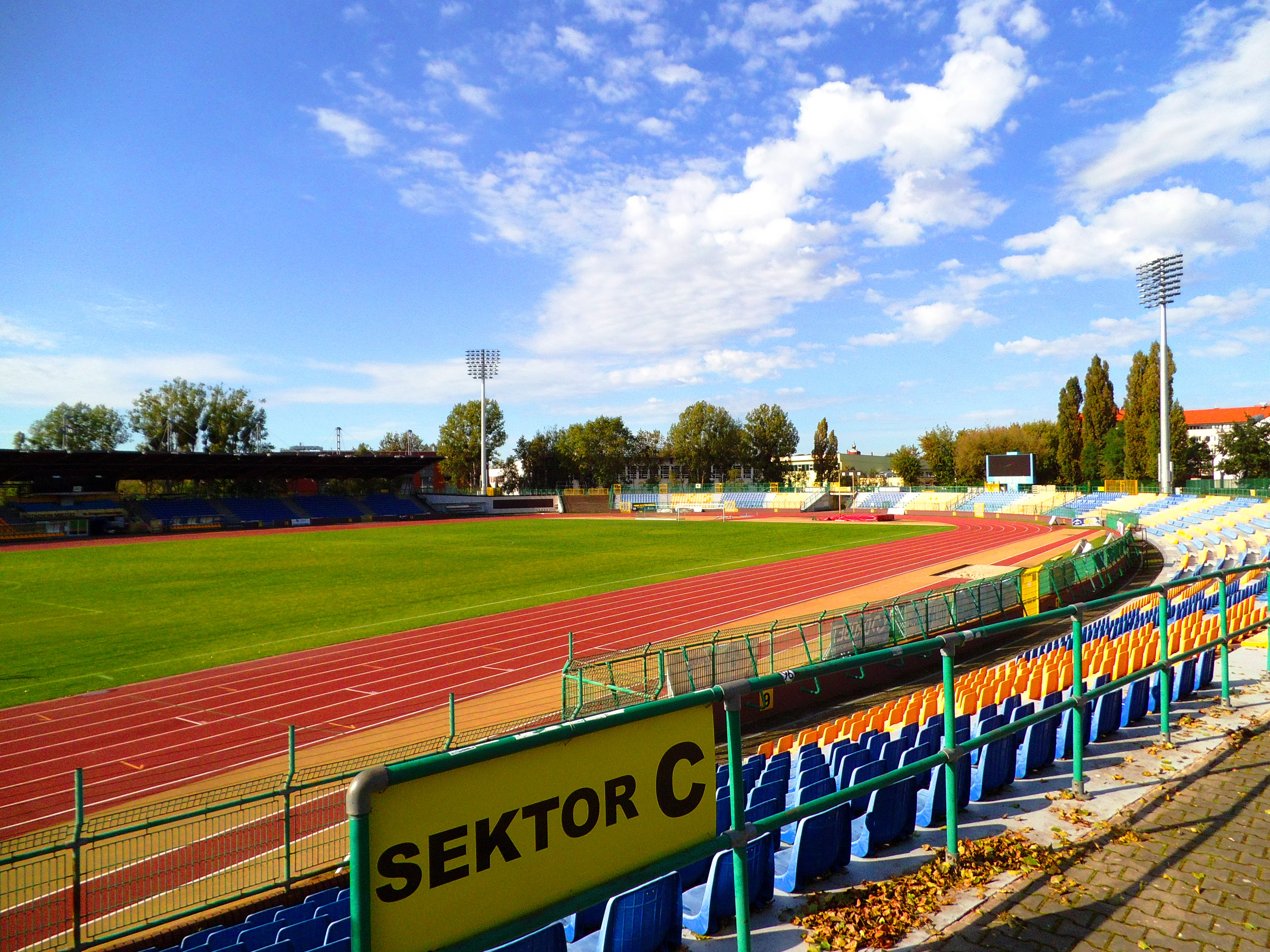
Municipal Stadium

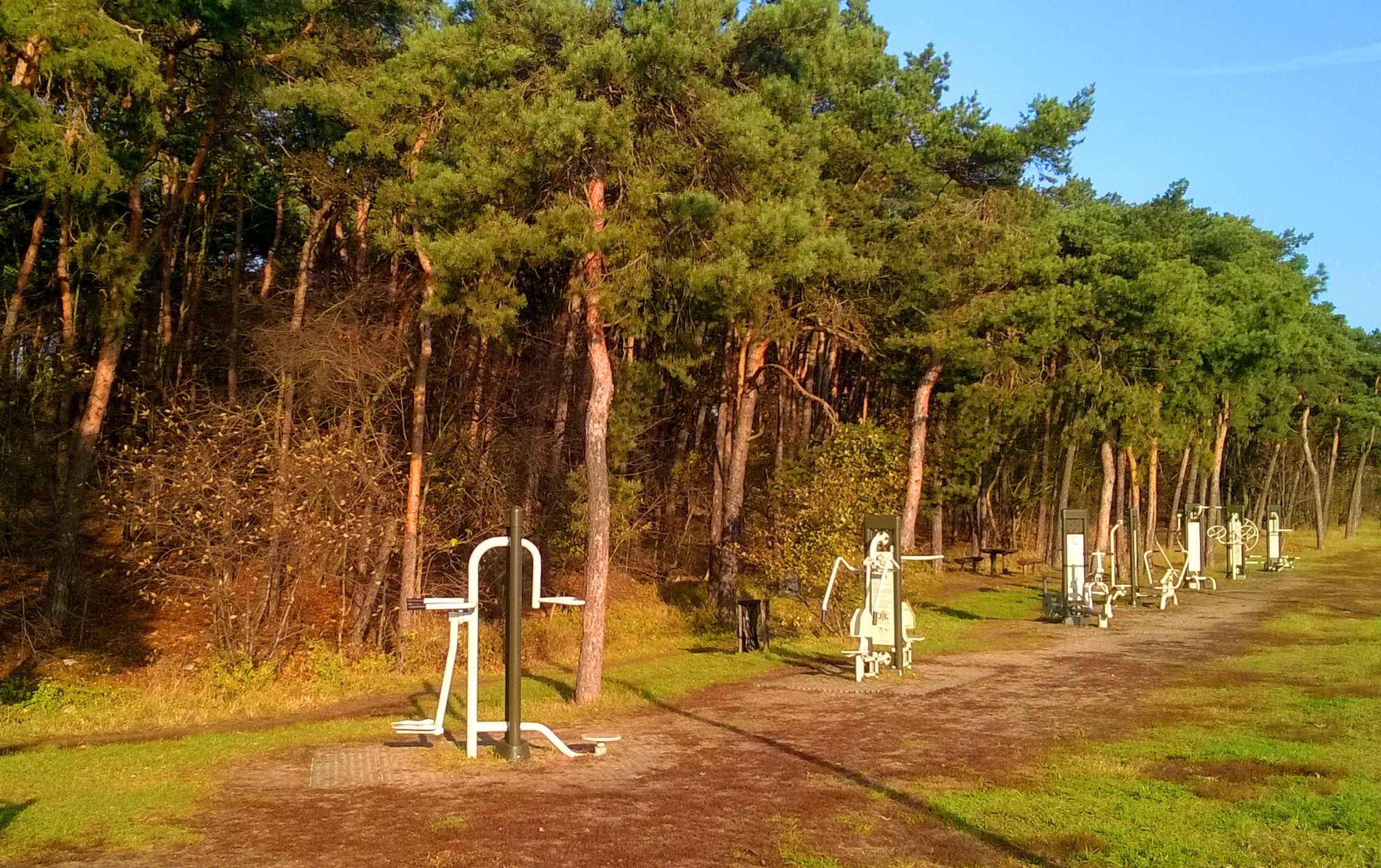
Rudelka Park

2023 World Masters Athletics Indoor Championships is the ninth in a series of World Masters Athletics Indoor Championships (also called World Masters Athletics Championships Indoor, or WMACi). This ninth edition took place in Toruń, Poland, from 25 to 31 March 2023.

This Championships was originally scheduled for 6-12 April, 2021 in Edmonton, Canada, but due to the COVID-19 pandemic, it was repeatedly postponed, first to 2022, then to 2023, but that was also canceled when Athletics Alberta withdrew its sponsorship in April 2022.

The main venue is Arena Toruń, which has a banked six-lane indoor track where the turns are raised to neutralize the centrifugal force of athletes running the curves. Supplemental venues include Municipal Stadium for throws, and Rudelka Park for Cross Country.

This Championships is organized by World Masters Athletics (WMA) in coordination with a Local Organising Committee (LOC) headed by Michał Zaleski, Mayor of Toruń, and Wacław Krankowski, President of Polish Masters Athletics.

The WMA is the global governing body of the sport of athletics for athletes 35 years of age or older, setting rules for masters athletics competition.

A full range of indoor track and field events were held. Since 2019 in addition to indoor disciplines, outdoor stadia events Hammer throw, Discus Throw and Javelin Throw and non-stadia events Half Marathon, 8K Cross Country, 10K Race Walk are included. New for the Championships was a mixed 4 x 200m relay.

== World Records ==
Official daily results are archived at domtel-sport.pl. Official world records for each event are archived at WMA.

Several masters world records were set at this Indoor Championships. World records for 2023 are from WMA unless otherwise noted.

=== Women ===
Event	Athlete(s)	Nationality	Performance
W60 60 Meters	Nicole Alexis on YouTube	FRA	8.33
W60 200 Meters	Nicole Alexis on YouTube	FRA	27.34
W70 200 Meters	Karla Del Grande on YouTube	CAN	31.18
W60 400 Meters	Virginia Mitchell on YouTube	GBR	1:04.55
W70 400 Meters	Karla Del Grande on YouTube	CAN	1:11.34
W60 800 Meters; Video on YouTube
W60 800 Meters; Video on YouTube	Virginia Mitchell	GBR	2:29:96
W60 800 Meters; Video on YouTube	Sue McDonald	USA	2:25.72
W60 1500 Meters	Sue McDonald on YouTube	USA	5:08.88
W65 60 Meters Hurdles	Jane Horder on YouTube	GBR	10.00
W50 Triple Jump	Andrea Szirbucz	HUN	11.69
W85 Shot Put	Sumiko Yamakawa	BRA	8.27
W60 Javelin Throw	Genowefa Patla	POL	41.14
W85 Discus Throw	Sumiko Yamakawa	BRA	21.22
W70 3000 Meters Race Walk	Maria Orlete Mendes	POR	17:39.27
W75 3000 Meters Race Walk	Antonina Tyshko	UKR	20:02.27

=== Men ===
Event	Athlete(s)	Nationality	Performance
M45 200 Meters	Lion Martinez on YouTube	SWE	22.23
M60 200 Meters	John Wright on YouTube	GBR	24.28
M90 200 Meters	Hiroo Tanaka	JPN	38.79
M55 800 Meters	Francesco D'Agostino on YouTube	ITA	2:06.10
M55 60 Meters Hurdles	Derek Pye on YouTube	USA	8.41
M75 Triple Jump	Karl Ollie Borg	SWE	9.79
M85 High Jump	Carl-Erik Särndal	SWE	1.27
M70 Pole Vault	Wolfgang Ritte	GER	3.56
M75 Hammer throw	Jerzy Jabłoński	POL	51.88
M75 Weight Throw	Arild Bursterud	NOR	20.99
M85 Pentathlon	Paulus Makkonen	FIN	2836

== Medals ==
* Host nation (Poland)

Rank	Nation	Gold	Silver	Bronze	Total
1	Poland*	83	67	52	202
2	Germany	74	74	86	234
3	United States	56	57	38	151
4	Great Britain	49	49	58	156
5	Spain	37	39	38	114
6	Italy	33	23	19	75
7	Ireland	28	23	24	75
8	Finland	27	18	14	59
9	France	26	24	34	84
10	Sweden	22	22	14	58
11	Australia	12	7	11	30
12	Netherlands	11	9	11	31
13	Norway	9	14	10	33
14	Portugal	9	7	6	22
15	Canada	8	11	12	31
16	Ukraine	7	7	8	22
17	Estonia	7	5	3	15
18	Denmark	7	3	4	14
19	Lithuania	6	4	3	13
20	Kenya	6	3	0	9
21	Belgium	5	4	6	15
22	Hungary	5	4	4	13
23	Brazil	5	1	3	9
24	Latvia	4	10	7	21
25	Japan	4	3	1	8
26	Tunisia	4	2	1	7
27	Czech Republic	3	16	10	29
28	Austria	3	5	5	13
29	New Zealand	3	2	1	6
30	Greece	3	1	5	9
31	India	3	1	1	5
32	Romania	2	5	7	14
33	Slovakia	2	3	4	9
34	Mexico	2	2	2	6
35	Switzerland	2	2	1	5
36	Bulgaria	2	1	1	4
37	Puerto Rico	2	0	2	4
38	United Arab Emirates	2	0	0	2
39	South Africa	1	2	1	4
40	Luxembourg	1	2	0	3
41	Jamaica	1	1	0	2
41	Venezuela	1	1	0	2
43	Iran	1	0	2	3
44	Ecuador	1	0	0	1
44	San Marino	1	0	0	1
46	Slovenia	0	3	4	7
47	Croatia	0	2	0	2
48	Hong Kong	0	1	2	3
49	Chile	0	1	0	1
49	Montenegro	0	1	0	1
49	Senegal	0	1	0	1
49	Trinidad and Tobago	0	1	0	1
49	Turkey	0	1	0	1
54	Israel	0	0	2	2
55	Argentina	0	0	1	1
55	Egypt	0	0	1	1
55	Iceland	0	0	1	1
55	Malta	0	0	1	1
Totals (58 entries)		580	545	521	1,646
