= Masters M55 200 metres world record progression =

This is the progression of world record improvements of the 200 metres M55 division of Masters athletics.

Key

Incomplete information Wind aided Pending Indoor mark

Hand	Auto	Wind	Athlete	Nationality	Birthdate	Age	Location	Date	Ref
	23.04	(+1.7 m/s)	Darren Scott	Great Britain	7 March 1969	55 years, 185 days	Stratford	8 September 2024	
	23.24	(+1.0 m/s)	Willie Gault	United States	5 September 1960	55 years, 245 days	Eagle Rock	7 May 2016	
	23.03	w	Ron Taylor	Great Britain	4 December 1933	55 years, 240 days	Eugene	1 August 1989	
	23.36	1.3	Bill Collins	United States	20 November 1950	55 years, 258 days	Charlotte	5 August 2006	
	23.36 i		Bill Collins	United States	20 November 1950	55 years, 258 days	Linz	16 March 2006	
	23.37	1.7	Ron Taylor	Great Britain	4 December 1933	56 years, 232 days	Budapest	24 July 1990	
	23.87		Alfred Guidet	United States	16 March 1918	55 years, 100 days	Eagle Rock	24 June 1973	
24.2			Payton Jordan	United States	19 March 1917	56 years, 5 days		24 March 1973	
