= 2008 World Masters Athletics Indoor Championships =

Coordinates: 45.757°N 3.106°E

- Dates: 17-22 March 2008
- Host city: Clermont-Ferrand, France
- Venue: Jean-Pellez Stadium
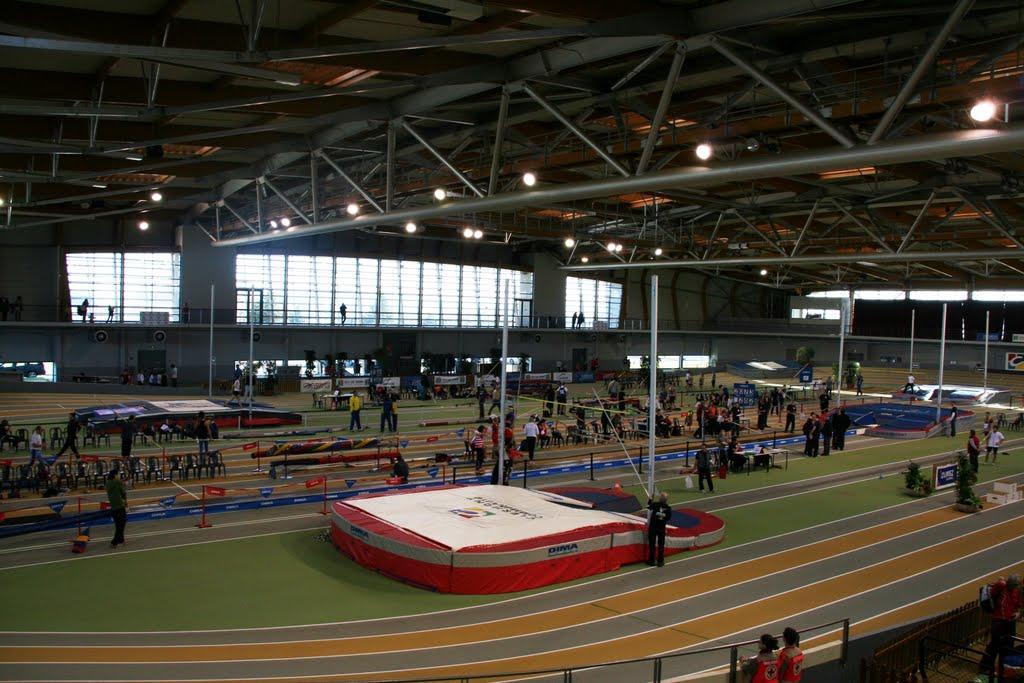
- Level: Masters
- Type: Indoor
- Participation: 3670 athletes from 65 nations
- Official website: Archived 2008-04-15 at the Wayback Machine

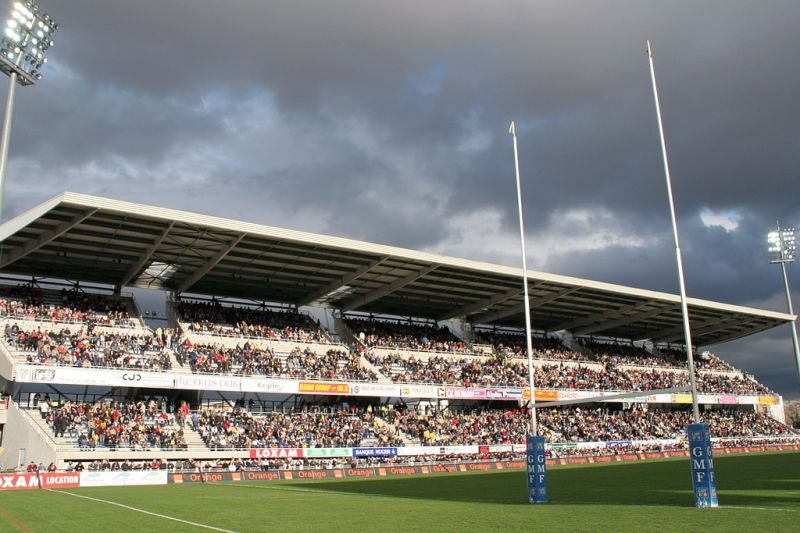
Stade Marcel-Michelin in 2011

2008 World Masters Athletics Indoor Championships is the third in a series of World Masters Athletics Indoor Championships (also called World Masters Athletics Championships Indoor, or WMACi). This third edition took place in Clermont-Ferrand, France, from 17 to 22 March 2008.

The main venue was Jean-Pellez Stadium, which has a banked indoor track where the turns are raised to neutralize the centrifugal force of athletes running the curves. Supplemental venues included Clermont-Ferrand Sports Hall for opening ceremonies, Les Gravanches for Half Marathon and 10K Race Walk, and Stade Marcel-Michelin for Cross Country.

This Championships was organized by World Masters Athletics (WMA) in coordination with a Local Organising Committee (LOC): Annie Laurent, Jean Gracia.

The WMA is the global governing body of the sport of athletics for athletes 35 years of age or older, setting rules for masters athletics competition.

A full range of indoor track and field events were held. In addition to indoor competition, non-stadia events included Half Marathon, 8K Cross Country, 10K Race Walk, Weight Throw, Hammer throw, Discus Throw and Javelin Throw.

== World Records ==
Official results are partially archived at Masters2008. Past Championships results are archived at WMA. Additional archives are available from European Masters Athletics as a searchable pdf, from British Masters Athletic Federation as a searchable pdf, and from Masters Athletics as a searchable pdf. USATF Masters keeps a list of American world record holders. Medal counts and other summaries are archived at the Clermont2008 and Masters2008 sites.

Several masters world records were set at this Indoor Championships. World records for 2008 are from WMA unless otherwise noted.

=== Women ===
Event	Athlete(s)	Nationality	Performance
W45 200 Meters	Marie Kay	AUS	25.85
W40 400 Meters	Barbara Aknin	FRA	56.15
W45 400 Meters	Marie Kay	AUS	56.99
W45 4 x 200 Meters Relay	Berend, Kauerhof, Grissmer, Schultz	GER	1:46.38
W70 Shot Put	Evaun Williams	GBR	10.82
W60 Weight Throw	Inge Faldager	DEN	16.70
W60 Half Marathon	Claudine Marchdier	FRA	1:28:21

=== Men ===
Event	Athlete(s)	Nationality	Performance
M60 200 Meters	Charles Allie on YouTube	USA	24.95
M40 400 Meters	Enrico Saraceni	ITA	48.95
M45 Half Marathon	Pascal Fetizon	FRA	1:08:55
M50 Half Marathon	Dominique Chauvelier	FRA	1:08:52
