= Masters M65 400 metres world record progression =

This is the progression of world record improvements of the 400 metres M65 division of Masters athletics.

Key

Incomplete information Pending Better indoor records

Hand	Auto	Athlete	Nationality	Birthdate	Age	Location	Date	Ref
	54.92 i	B. John Wright	Great Britain	15 June 1959	66 years, 287 days	Toruń	29 March 2026	
	56.28	Charles Allie	United States	20 August 1947	65 years, 12 days	Falls Church	1 September 2012	
	56.37	Guido Müller	Germany	22 December 1938	65 years, 174 days	Hof	13 June 2004	
	57.27	Ralph Romain	Trinidad and Tobago	20 July 1932	65 years, 5 days	Durban	25 July 1997	
	57.52	Berthold Neumann	Germany	19 December 1930	65 years, 216 days	Malmö	22 July 1996	
	57.97	Earl Fee	Canada	22 March 1929	66 years, 122 days	Buffalo	22 July 1995	
	58.52	Jim Law	United States	1926	65	Syracuse	27 June 1991	
	1:01.15	Arne Pettersson	Sweden	24 March 1923	65 years, 163 days	Gothenburg	3 September 1988	
