= Masters M70 200 metres world record progression =

This is the progression of world record improvements of the 200 metres M70 division of Masters athletics.

Key

Incomplete information Wind aided Pending

Hand	Auto	Wind	Athlete	Nationality	Birthdate	Age	Location	Date
	25.75	+1.7	Charles Allie	United States	20 August 1947	71 years, 1 day	Des Moines	21 August 2018
	26.47	+0.4	Glyn Sutton	United Kingdom	3 May 1945	70 years, 100 days	Lyon	11 August 2015
	26.48	-0.6	Guido Müller	Germany	22 December 1938	70 years, 191 days	Munich	1 July 2009
	26.71	+0.5	Horst Schrader	Germany	31 January 1935	70 years, 167 days	Vaterstetten	17 July 2005
	26.96	+2.7	Ralph Romain	Trinidad and Tobago	20 July 1932	70 years, 353 days	Carolina	8 July 2003
	27.36		Ralph Romain	Trinidad and Tobago	20 July 1932	70 years, 31 days	Leon	20 August 2002
26.8			Payton Jordan	United States	19 March 1917	70 years, 93 days	Eagle Rock	20 June 1987
	27.29		Frederick Reid	South Africa	3 August 1909	70 years, 351 days	Los Angeles	19 July 1980
