= Masters M90 discus world record progression =

Masters M90 discus world record progression is the progression of world record improvements of the discus M90 division of Masters athletics. Records must be set in properly conducted, official competitions under the standing IAAF rules unless modified by World Masters Athletics. The M90 division consists of male athletes who have reached the age of 90 but have not yet reached the age of 95, so exactly from their 90th birthday to the day before their 95th birthday. The M90 division throws a 1 kg implement.

Key

Incomplete information Pending

Distance	Athlete	Nationality	Birthdate	Location	Date
27.93A	Donald Pellmann	United States	12.08.1915	Fort Collins	04.09.2005
23.15	Mario Riboni	Italy	13.06.1913	Carolina	06.07.2003
21.36	Kalle Lehtinen	Finland	19.08.1908	Kajaani	18.06.2000
20.56	Buell Crane	United States	18.03.1900	Eugene	20.06.1990
