= World Masters Athletics Championships =

Sports competition

- Level: Masters (35+)
- Type: Masters athletics

The World Masters Athletics Championships are the biennial championships for masters athletics events held under the auspices of World Masters Athletics, formerly called the World Association of Veteran Athletes, for athletes 35 years of age or older. Masters athletes are divided into 5-year age groups.

The outdoor championships began in Toronto, Canada, on August 11, 1975 and have continued in odd numbered years. In July 2011, World Masters Athletics changed their constitution to hold Championships in even numbered years, starting in 2016. Perth, Australia, was selected to hold the first even year meet. Later Road Racing Championships called Non-Stadia Championships were added, starting in Birmingham, England, August 29–30, 1992. Indoor championships (World Masters Athletics Indoor Championships, World Masters Athletics Championships Indoor, or WMACi) started at Sindelfingen, Germany, March 10–14, 2004.

The 2020 edition was scheduled to take place at the York Lions Stadium and Varsity Stadium in Toronto, but was cancelled due to the COVID-19 pandemic. World Masters Athletics attempted to postpone the competition to 2021, with Tampere serving as host, but again this was cancelled due to the ongoing pandemic. The event was rescheduled to 2022 in Tampere and make-up editions being held in annual succession in 2023 (Edmonton) and 2024 (Gothenburg).

Athletes participating at these Championships consistently outnumber those at Olympic track and field events, making these "the world's largest track meet". For example, The 4,951 participants at the 1989 Outdoor Championships dwarfed the 1,617 athletics competitors at the 1988 Olympics; the 1993 Outdoor Championships drew over 11,000 masters athletes. Four-time Olympic Champion Al Oerter called these Championships "more like the Olympics than the Olympics".

An analysis of jumping and throwing events at the Championships from 1975 to 2016 showed that, as expected, performances usually declined with age, though overall performances improved across calendar years.

== Editions ==
=== Outdoor Championships ===
Official results are archived at the WMA site.

Edition	Year	City	Country	Venue	Dates
1	1975	Toronto	Canada	Centennial Park Stadium	11–16 August
2	1977	Gothenburg	Sweden	Slottsskogsvallen	8–13 August
3	1979	Hanover	West Germany	Niedersachsenstadion	27 July – 2 August
4	1981	Christchurch	New Zealand	Queen Elizabeth II Park	7–14 January
5	1983	San Juan	Puerto Rico	Estadio Sixto Escobar	23–30 September
6	1985	Rome	Italy	Stadio Olimpico	22–30 July
7	1987	Melbourne	Australia	Olympic Park Stadium	29 November – 6 December
8	1989	Eugene	United States	Hayward Field	27 July – 6 August
9	1991	Turku	Finland	Paavo Nurmi Stadium	18–28 July
10	1993	Miyazaki	Japan	Miyazaki Athletic Stadium	7–17 October
11	1995	Buffalo	United States	University at Buffalo Stadium	13–23 July
12	1997	Durban	South Africa	Kings Park Athletic Stadium	17–27 July
13	1999	Gateshead	United Kingdom	Gateshead International Stadium	29 July – 8 August
14	2001	Brisbane	Australia	Queensland Sport and Athletics Centre	1–14 July
15	2003	Carolina	Puerto Rico	Complejo Deportivo Municipal Roberto Clemente	1–13 July
16	2005	San Sebastián	Spain	Anoeta Stadium	22 August – 3 September
17	2007	Riccione	Italy	Stadio Italo Nicoletti	4–15 September
18	2009	Lahti	Finland	Lahden Stadion	28 July – 8 August
19	2011	Sacramento	United States	Hornet Stadium	6–17 July
20	2013	Porto Alegre	Brazil	Centro Estadual de Treinamento Esportivo	15–27 October
21	2015	Lyon	France	Stade de Balmont	4–16 August
22	2016	Perth	Australia	Western Australian Athletics Stadium	26 October – 6 November
23	2018	Málaga	Spain	Málaga Athletics Stadium	4–16 September
24	2022	Tampere	Finland	Ratinan Stadion	29 June – 10 July
25	2024	Gothenburg	Sweden	Slottsskogsvallen & Ullevi Stadium	13–25 August
26	2026	Daegu	South Korea	Daegu Stadium	22 August – 3 September
27	2028	Breda	Netherlands		
28	2030	Houston	United States		8–20 June

=== Indoor Championships ===
Official results are archived at the WMA site.

Edition	Year	City	Country	Venue	Date
1	2004	Sindelfingen	Germany	Glaspalast Sindelfingen	10–14 March
2	2006	Linz	Austria	TipsArena Linz	15–20 March
3	2008	Clermont-Ferrand	France	Jean-Pellez Stadium	17–22 March
4	2010	Kamloops	Canada	Tournament Capital Centre	2–7 March
5	2012	Jyväskylä	Finland	Hippos Hall	3–8 April
6	2014	Budapest	Hungary	SYMA Sports Centre	25–30 March
7	2017	Daegu	South Korea	Daegu Athletics Promotion Center	19–25 March
8	2019	Toruń	Poland	Arena Toruń	24–30 March
9	2023	Toruń	Poland	Arena Toruń	25–31 March
10	2025	Gainesville	USA	Alachua County Sports & Events Center	23–30 March
11	2027	Gainesville	USA	Alachua County Sports & Events Center	18–26 March

== See also ==
- Senior sport
- World Aquatics Masters Championships
