= Michał Zaleski =

Polish politician (born 1952)

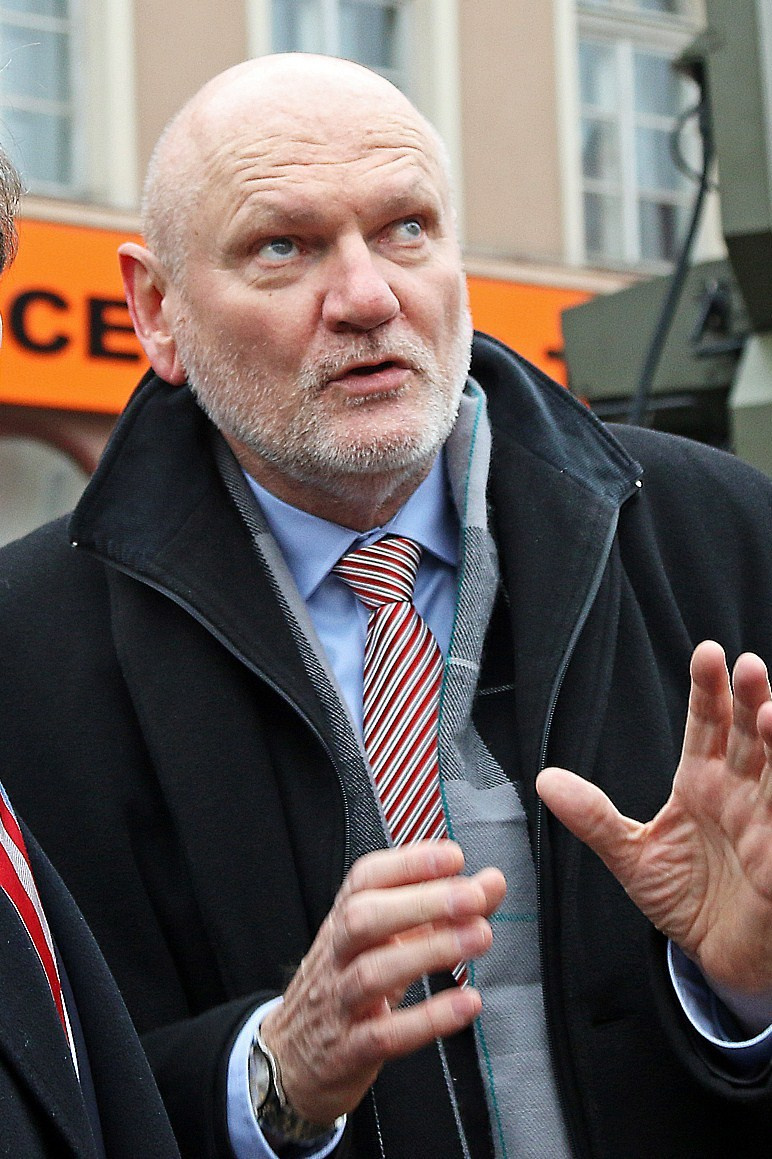

Mayor of Toruń
- Incumbent
- Assumed office 18 November 2002
- Preceded by: Wojciech Grochowski

Personal details
- Born: 14 July 1952 (age 74) Jabłonowo Pomorskie, Poland
- Party: Polish United Workers' Party (until 1990); Democratic Left Alliance (1990-2002); Independent (2002-2005); Democratic Party – demokraci.pl (2005); Independent (since 2005)
- Spouse: Krystyna Zaleski
- Children: Monika and Jakub Zaleski
- Education: Nicolaus Copernicus University in Toruń; University of Warsaw
- Occupation: Politician

Michał Franciszek Zaleski (born 14 July 1952) is a Polish politician. Zaleski was the mayor of Toruń from 18 November 2002 until April 2024.

== Biography ==
Zaleski was born on 14 July 1952 in Jabłonowo Pomorskie, Poland. He attended the Nicolaus Copernicus University in Toruń and the University of Warsaw.

Preceded by Wojciech Grochowski	Mayor of Toruń; 2002-	Succeeded by Incumbent
