= Ugo Sansonetti =

Italian writer and athlete (1919–2019)

Personal information
- Nickname: Matusalesto
- Nationality: Italian
- Born: 10 January 1919 Rome, Italy
- Died: 14 August 2019 (aged 100) Rome, Italy

Sport
- Country: Italy
- Sport: Masters athletics
- Event: Various events

Ugo Sansonetti (10 January 1919 – 14 August 2019), nicknamed Matusalesto (a pun based on the name of Matusalem and the Italian lesto, "quick"), was an Italian writer and masters athlete.

== Biography ==
He is the current world record holder in the M85 200 metres and M90 400 metres. He is famous throughout Italy for his appearance as a spry athlete in a Coca-Cola and a Bertolli advertisement.

Born in Rome, Italy, he was the son of Admiral Luigi Sansonetti. From 2011 he lived in Rome, and has ten children, 25 grandchildren and 5 great-grandchildren. He has a law degree and was a pioneer cavalry officer. He was an honorary citizen of Costa Rica, where he led a company doing agricultural colonization in the fifties. Among his writings is curating Emigranti alla conquista della foresta (translated=Migrants to the conquest of the forest), which promotes the colonization of Costa Rica.

In the seventies he directed and helped to lift a European frozen foods manufacturer that would later become known as Findus.

In 1991 he was appointed Grand Officer of the Order of Merit of the Italian Republic and in 2006 received the Star of Merit for his work.

== First octogenarian in zero gravity ==
In 2005, at the age of 86 years, he participated in project SpaceLand Sansonetti, a flight in a weightless environment on a Boeing 727 -200. Starting from Bordeaux, France, it was the first parabolic flight to accommodate ordinary citizens, and the first to bring on board an octogenarian.

== Masters athletics ==
As an athlete, he claimed to have won 70 medals, 42 of them gold. In addition to the outdoor world records, he held several indoor world records in the M90 60 metres, M85 and M90 200 metres and M90 400 metres. He won several World Masters Athletics Championships.

== Works ==
Author:

- Coto Brus, là dove gli alberi sorreggevano il cielo (Coto Brus, where the trees holding up the sky), Scorpio, 2000. ISBN 978-88-8099-091-8
- Non fermarsi mai! Per conservare la giovinezza fino agli 80 anni e oltre (Never stop! To preserve his youth up to 80 years and older), Sports Society Press, 2003. ISBN 978-88-8313-081-6
- SMS. Messaggi alle nuove generazioni (SMS. Message to new generations), Florence, Florence MEF Books The Author, 2008. ISBN 978-88-517-1665-3

Curator: Introducing: Herzel G. Weizmann, Emigranti alla conquista della foresta (Migrants to the conquest of the forest). Promoted Italian colonization in Costa Rica: San Vito de Java, Franco Angeli, 1985. ISBN 978-88-204-4848-6

== See also ==
- List of Italian records in masters athletics
