= Masters W55 long jump world record progression =

This is the progression of world record improvements of the long jump W55 division of Masters athletics.

Key

Incomplete information Pending better indoor records

Distance	Wind	Athlete	Nationality	Birthdate	Age	Location	Date	Ref
5.46	-1.5	Renata Novosel	Croatia	28 November 1967	55 years, 222 days	Varaždin	8 July 2023	
5.30	+1.1	Petra Bajeat	France	6 March 1966	55 years, 98 days	Saumur	12 June 2021	
5.06 A	-1.6	Neringa Jakstiene	United States	18 October 1963	55 years, 241 days	Albuquerque	16 June 2019	
5.22 i	-1.6	Neringa Jakstiene	United States	18 October 1963	55 years, 158 days	Toruń	25 March 2019	
5.06	+0.6	Ramona Pfeiffer	Germany	30 August 1961	55 years, 5 days	Essen	4 September 2016	
5.01	+1.5	Christiane Schmalbruch	Germany	8 January 1937	57 years, 231 days	Lübeck	27 August 1994	
4.70		Lieselotte Seuberlich	Germany	19 July 1926	57 years, 54 days	Aichach	11 September 1983	
4.48		Olga Oldrichova	Czechoslovakia	1 June 1928	55 years, 94 days	Svitavy	3 September 1983	
