= Masters M60 pole vault world record progression =

This is the progression of world record improvements of the pole vault M60 division of Masters athletics.

Key

Incomplete information Pending Indoor mark before 2000, not acceptable for record

Height	Athlete	Nationality	Birthdate	Location	Date
4.05 i	John Altendorf	United States	12.03.1946	Kamloops	04.03.2010
4.04	John Altendorf	United States	12.03.1946	Sacramento	22.07.2010
3.93	Bogdan Markowski	Germany	14.04.1946	Holzgerlingen	28.09.2008
3.91 i	Dale Lance	United States	29.10.1937	Boston	28.03.1998
3.90	Herbert Schmidt	Germany	11.01.1910	Duisburg	14.10.1971
