= Masters W90 200 metres world record progression =

This is the progression of world record improvements of the 200 metres W90 division of Masters athletics.

Key: Incomplete information Wind aided Pending

Hand	Auto	Wind	Athlete	Nationality	Birthdate	Age	Location	Date	Ref
	50.33	(+0.2 m/s)	Emma Mazzenga	Italy	1 August 1933	90 years, 306 days	Mestre	2 June 2024	
	51.47	(−0.3 m/s)	Emma Mazzenga	Italy	1 August 1933	90 years, 278 days	San Biagio di Callalta	5 May 2024	
	53.35	(−0.2 m/s)	Emiko Saito	Japan	13 March 1931	91 years, 147 days	Chiba City	7 August 2022	
	55.62	(+0.7 m/s)	Mitsu Morita	Japan	29 March 1923	90 years, 93 days	Nagasaki	30 June 2013	
	56.46	(+0.3 m/s)	Olga Kotelko	Canada	2 March 1919	90 years, 148 days	Lahti	28 July 2009	
	1:07.43	NWI	Modesta Martinez Ramirez	Mexico	23 February 1918	90 years, 160 days	Mexico City	1 August 2008	
	1:17.85	(+1.2 m/s)	Lillian Webb	United States	1914	92	Louisville	26 June 2007	
	1:22.29	(+1.4 m/s)	Rosario Iglesias Rocha	Mexico	20 September 1910	92	Carolina	2003	
