= Masters M55 400 metres world record progression =

This is the progression of world record improvements of the 400 metres M55 division of Masters athletics.

Key

Incomplete information Pending

Hand	Auto	Athlete	Nationality	Birthdate	Age	Location	Date	Ref
	51.18	Timothy Munnings	Bahamas	22 June 1966	58 years, 238 days	Nassau	15 February 2025	
	51.92	Allen Woodard	United States	16 January 1969	55 years, 95 days	Houston	20 April 2024	
	52.24	Charles Allie	United States	20 August 1947	55 years, 326 days	Carolina	12 July 2003	
	52.52	Ralph Romain	Trinidad and Tobago	20 July 1932	58 years, 2 days	Alexandria	22 July 1990	
	53.81	Berthold Neumann	Germany	19 December 1930	55 years, 261 days	Radolfzell	6 September 1986	
	54.56	Rudolph Valentine	United States	12 July 1923	55 years, 332 days	Eagle Rock	9 June 1979	
55.9 h		Charles Beaudry	United States	4 September 1918	55 years, 348 days		18 August 1974	
