= Tournament Capital Centre =

Sports venue in Kamloops, British Columbia

- Interactive map of Tournament Capital Centre
- Location: 910 McGill Road; Kamloops BC V2C 6N6
- Coordinates: 50°40′7″N 120°21′54″W
- Owner: City of Kamloops
- Operator: City of Kamloops
- Capacity: 2200

Tenant
- Thompson Rivers WolfPack

The Tournament Capital Centre is a facility next to Thompson Rivers University's campus. It hosts the Thompson Rivers WolfPack Basketball games. "The Fieldhouse consists of an indoor 6 lane, 200 metre track surrounding three NBA size basketball courts and seating for 2,200."

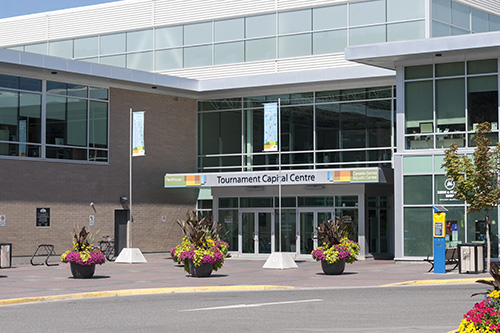
Welcome to TCC

Tournament Capital Centre
