= Enrico Saraceni =

Italian athlete (born 1964)

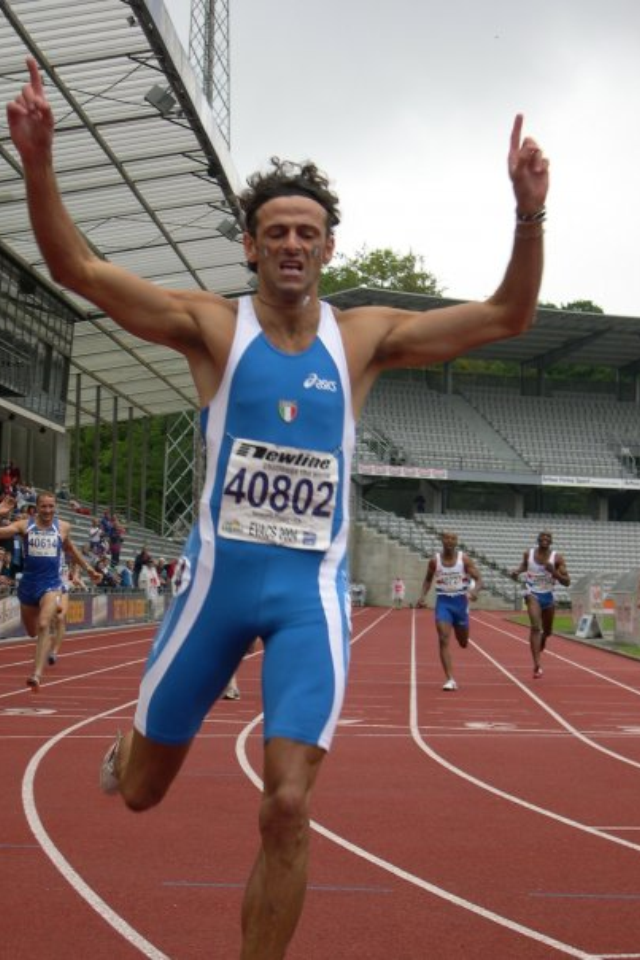

Personal information
- Full name: Enrico Giorgio Saraceni
- Nickname: Cobra
- Nationality: Italian
- Born: May 19, 1964 (age 62) Fossacesia, Italy
- Height: 1.92 m (6 ft 3 1/2 in)
- Weight: 78 kg (172 lb)

Sport
- Country: Italy
- Sport: Athletics; Masters athletics
- Event: 400 metres
- Club: Atletica Riccardi

Achievements and titles
- Personal bests: 400 m outdoor: 46.86 (2001); 400 m indoor: 47.56 (2001)

Enrico Saraceni (born May 19, 1964 in Fossacesia, Italy) is an Italian athlete, known for setting the M40 division Masters Athletics World Record in the 400 metres.

== Biography ==
His first known results date to 1995 in the European athletic competition for postal workers. In 2001 he was the Italian champion in the Indoor 400 metres, running 47.56. Later that year, he also set his personal best 46.86, at the age of 37 at Brixen, which qualified him to represent Italy in the European Cup in Bremen, Germany, as well as participating as the 3rd leg on the 4x400 relay.

As a Masters athlete after turning 40 in 2004, he won the European Masters Championships at Aarhus, Denmark, winning both the 200 metres and 400 metres, setting the record at 47.81. The record was formerly held by Olympic champion Lee Evans. Since then he has also added the world record in the Indoor 400 metres at 48.95 set at the World Masters Athletics Indoor Championships in Clermont-Ferrand, France in 2008. Saraceni has won numerous additional world championships in the Masters division.

== See also ==
- List of world records in masters athletics
