= Masters M70 400 metres world record progression =

This is the progression of world record improvements of the 400 metres M70 division of Masters athletics.

Key

Incomplete information Pending

Hand	Auto	Athlete	Nationality	Birthdate	Age	Location	Date
	57.26	Charles Allie	United States	20 August 1947	71 years, 22 days	Málaga	11 September 2018
	59.34	Guido Müller	Germany	22 December 1938	70 years, 218 days	Lahti	28 July 2009
	1:00.77	Hugh Coogan	Australia	15 August 1935	70 years, 229 days	Nathan	1 April 2006
	1:01.01	Ralph Romain	Trinidad and Tobago	20 July 1932	70 years, 357 days	Carolina	12 July 2003
	1:01.10	Jim Selby	United States	18 July 1928	70 years, 336 days	La Jolla	19 June 1999
	1:01.29	Wilhelm Selzer	Germany	7 May 1927	70 years, 100 days	Schweinfurt	15 August 1997
	1:01.71	Rudolf Ahrenkiel	Denmark	16 July 1920	73 years, 8 days	Herning	24 July 1993
1:02.2		John Alexander	United States	6 September 1919	70 years, 18 days		24 September 1989
1:04.6		Josiah Packard	United States	15 December 1903	73 years, 238 days	Gothenburg	10 August 1977
