= Glaspalast Sindelfingen =

Sports arena in Sindelfingen, Germany

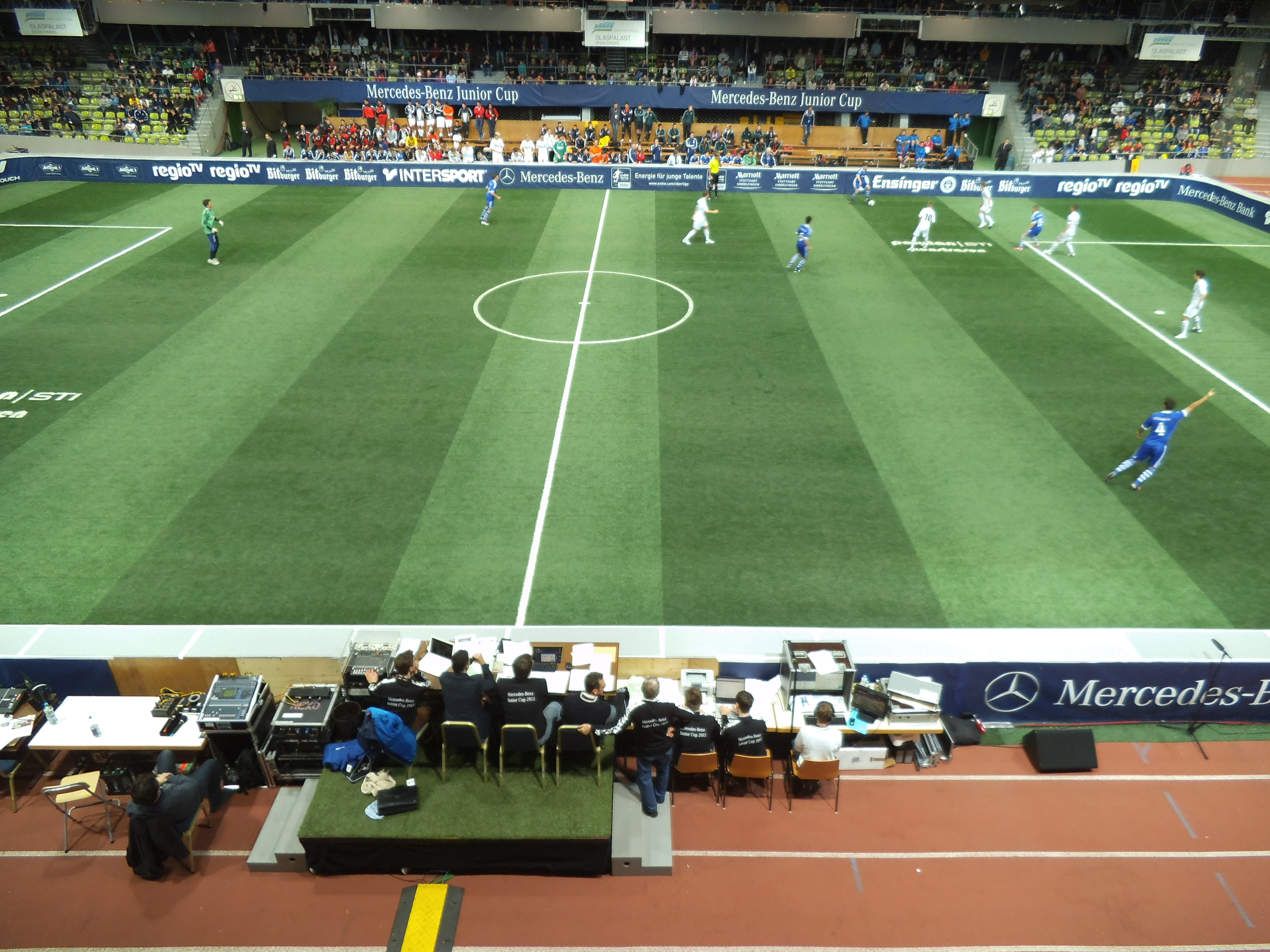
- Interactive map of Glaspalast Sindelfingen
- Former names: Sporthalle Unterrieden; Sporthalle Sindelfingen
- Location: Sindelfingen, Germany
- Coordinates: 48°42′57″N 8°59′01″E
- Owner: Stadt Sindelfingen
- Operator: Verein zur Pflege und Förderung des Sportes im Glaspalast Sindelfingen e.V.
- Capacity: 5,250
- Surface: Tartan
- Scoreboard: Yes

Construction
- Groundbreaking: 1976
- Opened: 1977
- Expanded: 2003
- Architect: Günter Behnisch

Tenant
- 1980 European Athletics Indoor Championships

Website
- Glaspalast Sindelfingen

Glaspalast Sindelfingen is an indoor arena, in Sindelfingen, Germany. The arena holds 5,250 people. It is primarily used for indoor athletics and concerts.

KISS performed at the arena during their Lick It Up Tour on November 4, 1983.

World Masters Athletics held its first Indoor Championships here in 2004.

The PDC has held the European Darts Open in the arena as part of the PDC European Tour every year since 2014, with the exception of 2022.

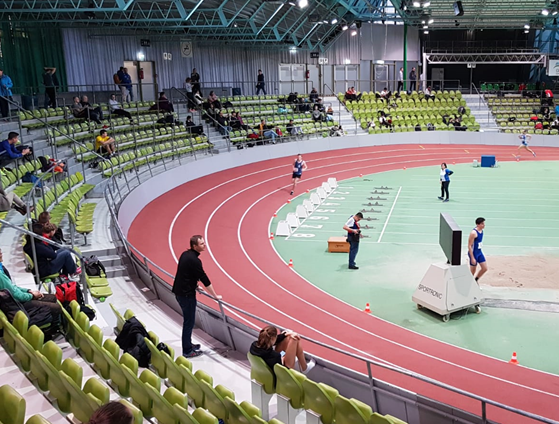
track for athletics

Preceded by Ferry-Dusika-Hallenstadion; Vienna	European Indoor Championships in Athletics; Venue; 1980	Succeeded by Palais des Sports; Grenoble
