= Bill Collins (sprinter) =

American sprinter

Medal record

Men's athletics

Representing the United States

Pan American Games
Gold medal – first place	1975 Mexico City	4 x 100 m relay

IAAF World Cup
Gold medal – first place	1977 Düsseldorf	4 x 100 m relay

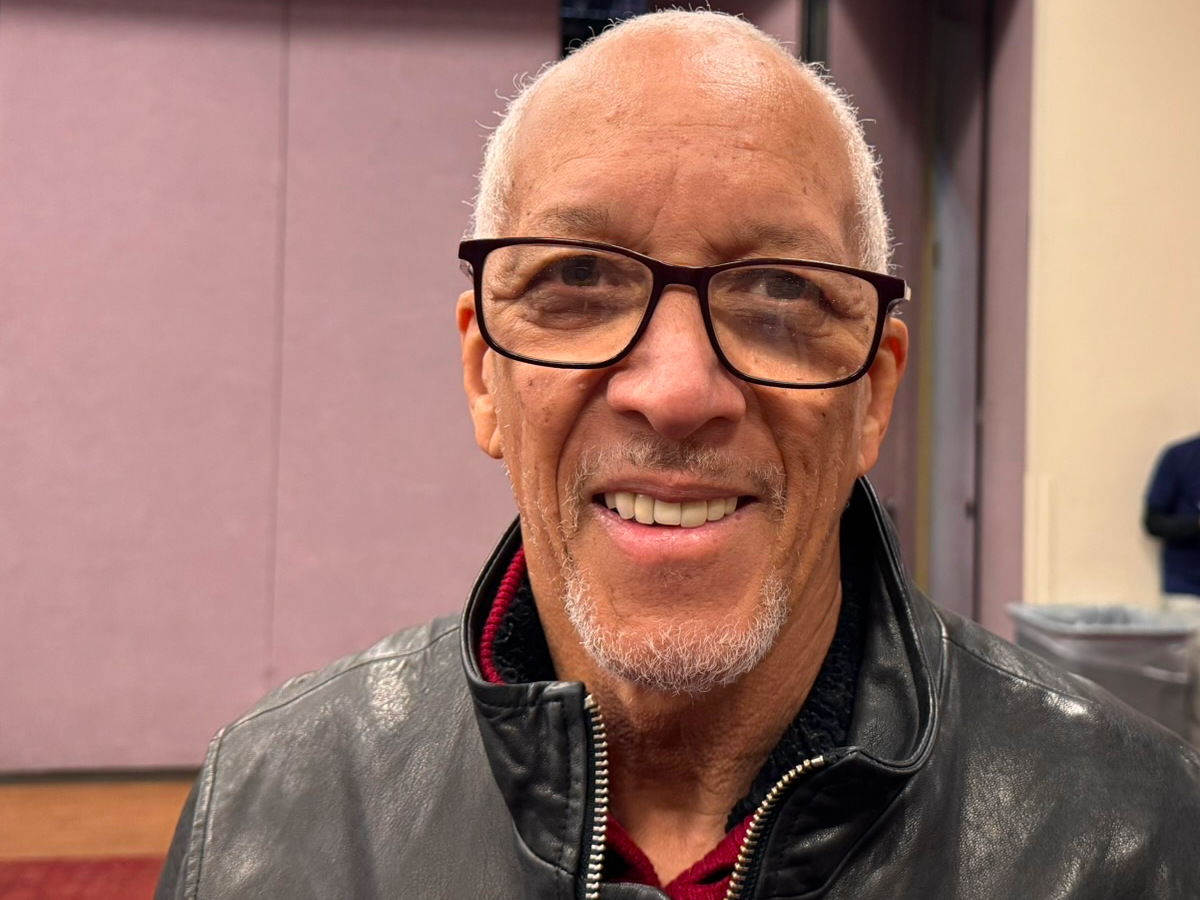
Bill Collins in 2026

William Collins (born November 20, 1950) is an American sprinter, originally running for Mount Vernon High School in Westchester County, New York, where he won four state titles and later at Texas Christian University where he achieved "All-American" status.

== Biography ==
In 1976 he managed to make the finals in the 100 metres at the United States Olympic Trials, finishing last which qualified him for the relay pool, though he never ran in the Olympics. He did make the USA 4x100 relay team that won at the first ever 1977 IAAF World Cup. That team's 38.03 was the world record in the event for almost 6 years. He was ranked #7 in the US top ten at 200 metres in 1977 and 1975 At 100 metres he was near the bottom of the top ten 1974-1976

At the international Pacific Conference Games in 1977 he won overtage 200 meters, and placed second over 100 meters, and he was on the winning 4 x 100 meters relay team.

Collins has previously held three Masters Athletics World Records at the 100 metres, at the M40, M50 and M55 age classifications.

Younger athletes who train with him and his Houston Elite Track Club at Rice University refer to him as "Superman." Indoors and outdoors, he has won numerous World and National Championships. In a class by himself he is rarely beaten, except when injured.

In 2003 he was voted into the Masters Division of the National Track and Field Hall of Fame. Geezerjock Magazine name him their inaugural "Geezerjock of the Year" in 2005. In 2007 he was named "World Masters Athletics Masters Athlete of the Year" which was presented at the IAAF gala in Monaco.

At his first major meet after turning 60, Collins set the world indoor record in the M60 200 metres and 400 metres. He was named USATF "Athlete of the Week" amongst all age divisions. He had received the same citation almost exactly five years earlier after his first major competition after entering the previous age division and setting world records.

He co-authored, with Rick Riddle a book on Masters sprinting, "The Ageless Athletic Spirit: Training with a World Champion"

In 2011, Collins suffered paralysis in his legs, rendering him unable to walk. It was later diagnosed as Guillain–Barré syndrome. As inexplicable as the disease's cause, was his recovery. After spending the 2011 season (when the World Masters Athletics Championships were held in the United States) in a wheelchair, in early 2012 "Superman" came back to set a new indoor world record in the M60 60 metres at the USATF Masters Indoor Championships.

== Personal life ==
He is Married to his beautiful wife Stephanie Collins. Bill has five Children: His oldest and only daughter Alicia Collins, son Christopher Collins, Arte Collins, Lavon Collins and Aviante Collins.
