= 1985 World Masters Athletics Championships =

Coordinates: 41.933886°N 12.454786°E

- Dates: 22-30 June 1985
- Host city: Rome, Italy
- Venue: Stadio Olimpico
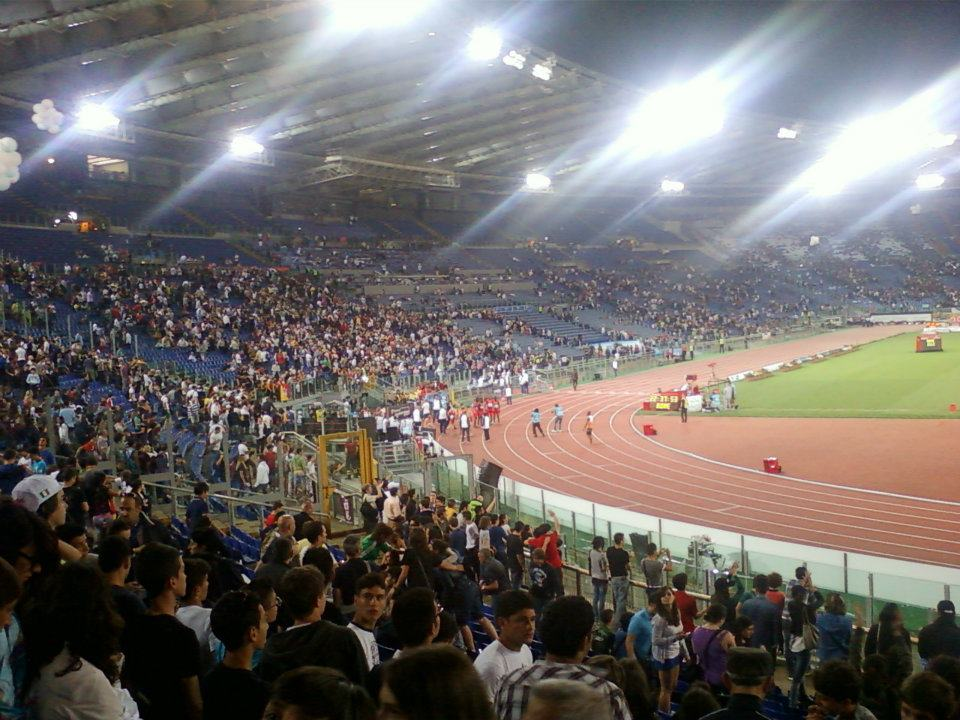
- Level: Masters
- Type: Outdoor
- Participation: 4330 athletes from 48 nations

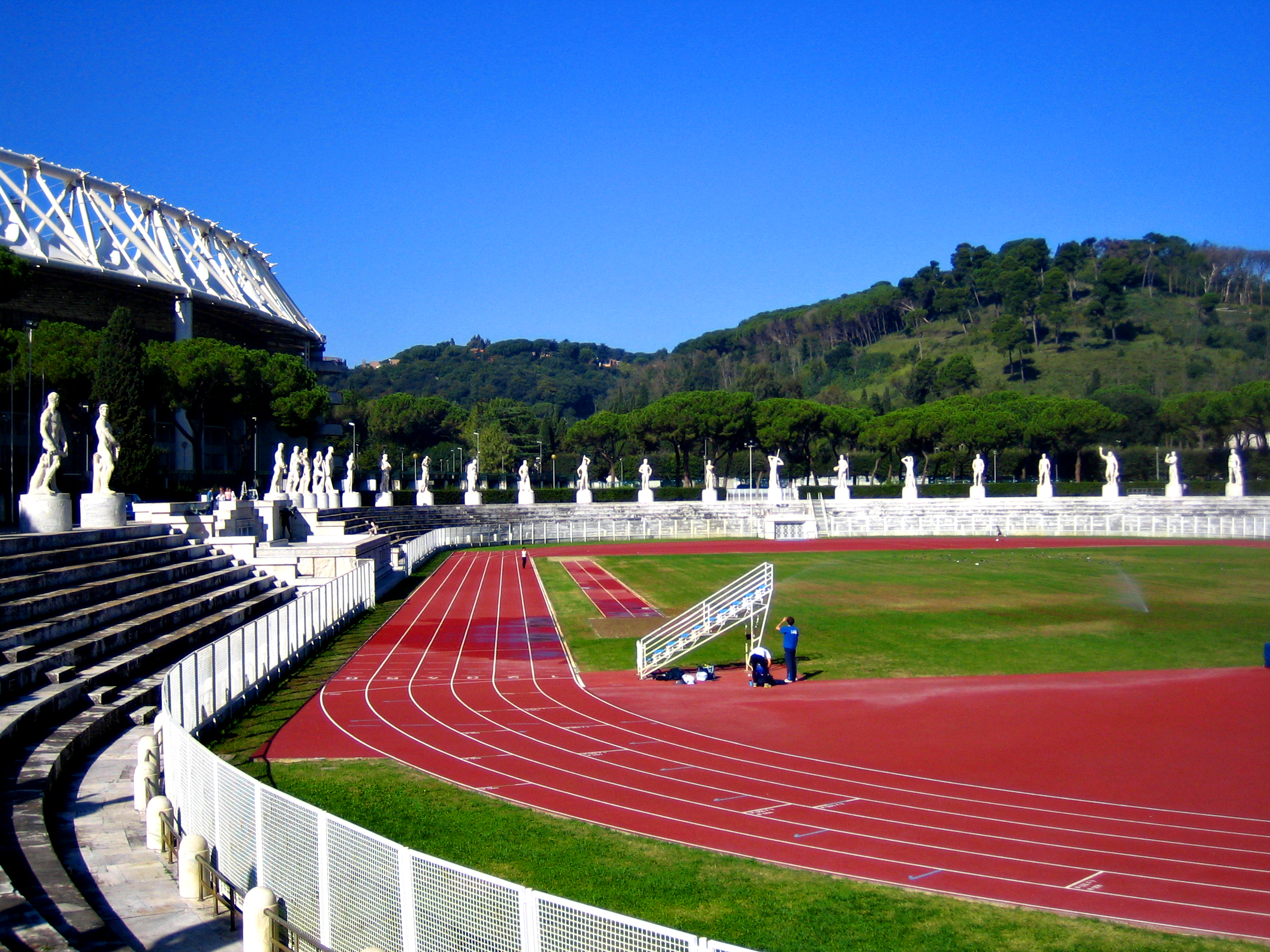
Stadio dei Marmi

1985 World Masters Athletics Championships is the sixth in a series of World Masters Athletics Outdoor Championships (called World Veterans Games or World Masters Games at the time) that took place in Rome, Italy, from June 22 to 30, 1985.

The main venue was Stadio Olimpico located within the Foro Italico sports complex. Stadio Olimpico had hosted the 1960 Summer Olympics. Supplemental venues included Stadio dei Marmi, also located within the complex, Stadio Acqua Acetosa and Stadio della Farnesina.

This edition of masters athletics Championships had a minimum age limit of 35 years for women and 40 years for men.

The governing body of this series is World Association of Veteran Athletes (WAVA). WAVA was formed during meeting at the inaugural edition of this series at Toronto in 1975, then officially founded during the second edition in 1977, then renamed as World Masters Athletics (WMA) at the Brisbane Championships in 2001.

This Championships was organized by WAVA in coordination with a Local Organising Committee (LOC) headed by Cesare Beccalli, who later was elected WAVA president on December 2, 1987 in Melbourne.

In addition to a full range of track and field events, non-stadia events included 8K Cross Country, 10K Race Walk (women), 20K Race Walk (men), and Marathon. The relays were resurrected as official events after being removed in the 1983 Championships, but teams were formed by region rather than by nation. Relays will revert to national teams for 1987.

== Controversy ==
In 1976, the International Amateur Athletic Federation (IAAF) had expelled the Amateur Athletic Union of South Africa due to the apartheid policy of the South African government at that time, though the WAVA constitution as written in 1977 specifically stated its independence from IAAF regarding this issue:

no competitor be barred because of race, religion, ethnic background, or national origin.

Nevertheless, participation of South African athletes had been an issue in this series. At this Championships, about 48 South Africans competed, though they signed up through another nation, in a manner similar to the last 2 Championships in 1981 and 1983, However, many of these athletes were listed under their native RSA flag in the results.

== World Records ==
Past Championships results are archived at WMA. Additional archives are available from Museum of Masters Track & Field as a pdf book, as a searchable pdf, and in pdf newsletters from National Masters News. The pdf book includes a rare photograph of the blind sprinter Fritz Assmy next to his son/guide. The August newsletter shows a series of photographs of Assmy in action, guided by his son with a short wrist tether. Assmy won golds in M70 100m and 200m, and silver in 400m. He described his running technique in the June newsletter.

Several masters world records were set at this Championships. World records for 1985 are from the Museum of Masters Track & Field searchable pdf unless otherwise noted.

=== Women ===
Event	Athlete(s)	Nationality	Performance
W60 400 Meters	Paula Schneiderhan	FRG	1:12.24
W70 400 Meters	Winifred Reid	RSA	1:19:74
W45 800 Meters	Godelieve Roggeman	BEL	2:18.52
W60 800 Meters	Erika Werner	FRG	2:59.52
W65 800 Meters	Lenore Marvin	CAN	3:17.IB
W70 800 Meters	Johanna Luther	FRG	3:19.03
W35 1500 Meters	Joyce Smith	GBR	4:12.0
W45 1500 Meters	Godelieve Roggeman	BEL	4:43.84
W40 5000 Meters	Gabriela Andersen-Schiess	USA	16:44.28
W45 5000 Meters	Anne Marie Grüner	FRG	17:41.24
W55 5000 Meters	Jean Albury	AUS	19:20.60
W65 5000 Meters	Lenore Marvin	CAN	23:31.70
W45 10000 Meters	Anne Marie Grüner	FRG	36:41.04
W55 10000 Meters	Jean Albury	AUS	40:29.8
W55 High Jump	Christiane Wippersteg	FRG	1.30
W60 High Jump	Kirsten Hveem	NOR	1.25
W75 High Jump	Bertha Hielscher	FRG	1.08
W40 Long Jump	Ciska Jansen	NED	5.90
W65 Long Jump	Elizabeth Haule	FRG	3.41
W50 Shot Put	Odette Domingos	BRA	12.82
W50 Discus Throw	Odette Domingos	BRA	43.64
W60 Javelin Throw	Ada Turci	ITA	26.22
W40 5K Race Walk	Lillian Millen	GBR	25:23.2
W70 10K Race Walk	Francine Bonnans	FRA	1:11:59

=== Men ===
Event	Athlete(s)	Nationality	Performance
M50 200 Meters	Ron Taylor	GBR	23.15
M45 400 Meters	James Burnett	USA	50.46
M50 400 Meters	Ingo Vierk	FRG	52.24
M60 400 Meters	Frank Evans	NZL	58.11
M60 800 Meters	Frank Evans	NZL	2:14.02
M65 1500 Meters	John Gilmour	AUS	4:49.16
M65 5000 Meters	John Gilmour	AUS	17:25.3
M70 80 Meters Hurdles	Teófilo Colón	PUR	13.52
M60 400 Meters Hurdles	Frans Buys	NED	1:05.36
M50 5K Race Walk	Abdon Pamich	ITA	23:22.2
M55 5K Race Walk	Louis Marquisr	SUI	24:25.2
M50 20K Race Walk	Maurice Hinton	NZL	1:41.37
M55 20K Race Walk	Louis Marquisr	SUI	1:44:44
M65 High Jump	Hans Bitter	FRG	1.55
M70 High Jump	Ian Hume	CAN	1.43
M70 Triple Jump	Ian Hume	CAN	10.17
M75 Triple Jump	Gulab Singh	IND	8.98
M70 Shot Put	Voitto Elo	FIN	14.05
M85 Hammer throw	Friederich Bender	FRG	27.30
M50 Javelin Throw	Josef Kopitar	YUG	61.94
M75 Pole Vault	Ahti Pajunen	FIN	2.50
