= 1977 World Masters Athletics Championships =

Coordinates: 57.677778°N 11.939444°E

- Dates: 8-13 August 1977
- Host city: Gothenburg, Sweden
- Venue: Slottsskogsvallen
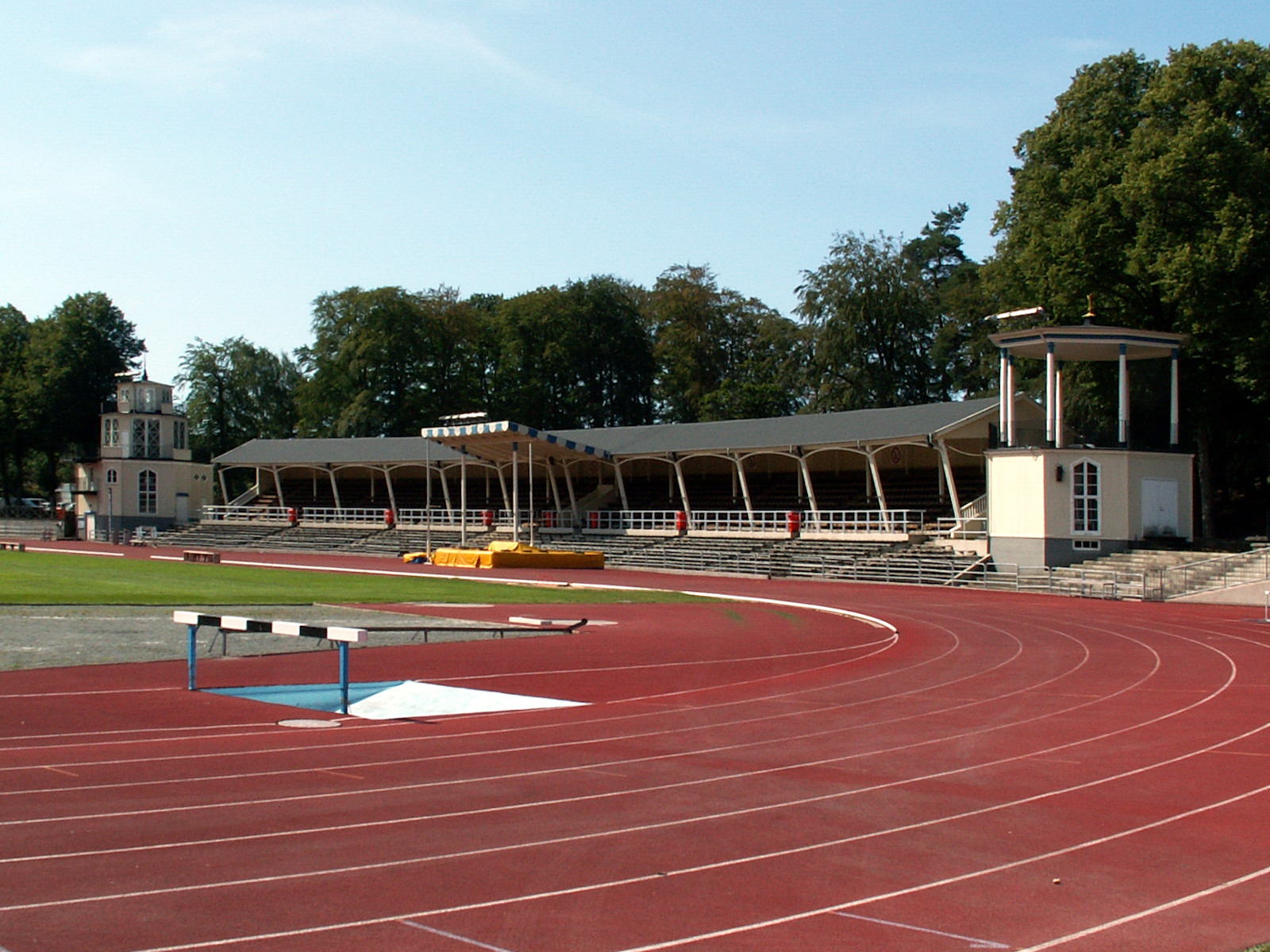
- Level: Masters
- Type: Outdoor
- Participation: 2670 athletes from 45 nations

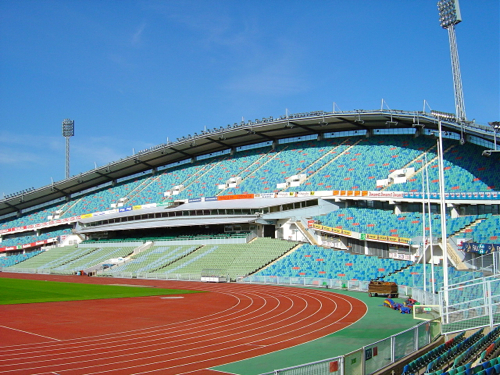
Ullevi Stadium

1977 World Masters Athletics Championships is the second in a series of World Masters Athletics Outdoor Championships (called World Masters Championships or World Veterans Championships at the time) that took place in Gothenburg, Sweden, from 8 to 13 August 1977.

The main venue was Slottsskogsvallen. Supplemental venues included Ullevi Stadium for 5K and 10K races, the former Gothenburg-Särö railroad route for Marathon, and the park around Björngårdsvillan for Cross Country and Road Walks.

This edition of masters athletics Championships had a minimum age limit of 35 years for women and 40 years for men. The age groups for women are now in 5-year (rather than 10-year as in 1975) divisions, same as for men.

The governing body of this series is World Association of Veteran Athletes (WAVA, initially called World Veterans Athletic Association). WAVA was formed during meeting at the inaugural edition of this series at Toronto in 1975, then officially founded and named when its constitution was proposed during General Assembly at this edition on 9 August 1977. WAVA was renamed as World Masters Athletics (WMA) at the Brisbane Championships in 2001.

This Championships was organized by the nascent WAVA in coordination with a Local Organising Committee (LOC) led by Roland Jerneryd (SWE). Jerneryd was elected WAVA secretary at the General Assembly.

In addition to a full range of track and field events, non-stadia events included 8K Cross Country and Marathon.

== Controversy ==
A major issue at the WAVA founding was South Africa, which had been expelled by the International Amateur Athletic Federation (IAAF) in 1976 due to the apartheid policy of the South African government at that time. The WAVA constitution was written to be independent of IAAF, and stated that

no competitor be barred because of race, religion, ethnic background, or national origin.

Nevertheless, South African participation was not settled when the meet began, before the WAVA constitution was proposed, and several athletes from South Africa (and Rhodesia) registered as Americans. The issue of South African athletes remained controversial until South Africa rejoined IAAF in 1992, after the end of the apartheid system.

== World Records ==
Past Championships results are archived at WMA. Additional archives are available from Museum of Masters Track & Field as a pdf book, as a searchable pdf, and in a pdf newsletter.

Several masters world records were set at this Championships, including M40 5k run and 3k steeplechase by 1964 Olympic gold medalist Gaston Roelants, and M40 discus by four-time Olympic Champion Al Oerter. The blind sprinter Fritz Assmy wowed the crowd with 2 victories in the M60 100m and 200m, guided by his son-in-law Klaus Hinrichsen in lane 8. World records for 1977 are from WMA unless otherwise noted.

=== Women ===
No world records were reported. Among the notable performances, American Miki Gorman won the W40 1500m, 3000m, cross-country, and marathon, while Irish Maeve Kyle won the W45 in 100m, 400m, high jump and long jump.

=== Men ===
Event	Athlete(s)	Nationality	Performance
M60 100 Meters	Percy Duncan	CAN	12.40
M50 200 Meters	Jack Greenwood	USA	23.7
M60 200 Meters	Fritz Assmy	FRG	26.0
M75 200 Meters	Herb Anderson	USA	31.7
M40 200 Meters	Reginald Austin	AUS	21.9
M40 400 Meters	Noel Clough	AUS	49.5
M50 400 Meters	Jack Greenwood	USA	52.9
M70 400 Meters	Josiah Packard	USA	1:04.6
M75 400 Meters	Herb Anderson	USA	1:09.9
M40 800 Meters	Tony Blue	AUS	1:54.8
M45 800 Meters	Johan Hesselberg	NOR	1:57.9
M75 800 Meters	Harold Chapson	USA	2:41.4
M45 1500 Meters	P Majoor	NED	4:05.6
M75 1500 Meters	Harold Chapson	USA	5:30.1
M40 5000 Meters	Gaston Roelants	BEL	14:03.0
M70 5000 Meters	Einar Nordin	SWE	19:59.3
M75 5000 Meters	Paul Spangler	USA	21:20.2
M70 10000 Meters	Einar Nordin	SWE	40:48.5
M50 100 Meters Hurdles	Jack Greenwood	USA	15.1
M55 100 Meters Hurdles	Tom Patsalis	USA	17.2
M60 100 Meters Hurdles	Robert Reckwardt	FRG	19.5
M65 100 Meters Hurdles	R. Lacey	USA	20.9
M70 100 Meters Hurdles	W McFadden	USA	23.7
M75 100 Meters Hurdles	Herb Anderson	USA	26.6
M40 400 Meters Hurdles	Noel Clough	AUS	54.3
M40 3000 Meters Steeplechase	Gaston Roelants	BEL	8:56.6
M45 3000 Meters Steeplechase	Hal Higdon	USA	9:39.0
M70 3000 Meters Steeplechase	R Wiseman	GBR	18:03.0
M60 High Jump	Erik Stai	NOR	1.57
M60 High Jump	Ian Hume	CAN	1.54
M65 High Jump	Ivar Sand	NOR	1.46
M40 Long Jump	T Chilton	USA	7.03
M45 Triple Jump	Hermann Strauss	FRG	13.90
M45 Triple Jump	Dave Jackson	USA	13.77
M60 Triple Jump	E Seater	NOR	10.70
M65 Triple Jump	Ivar Sand	NOR	10.42
M75 Triple Jump	Herb Anderson	USA	8.36
M80 Triple Jump	S Falk	SWE	6.44
M75 Shot Put	F. Posluschni	FRG	10.78
M40 Shot Put	Ivan Ivančić	YUG	18.03
M80 Shot Put	P Goic	YUG	8.74
M40 Discus Throw	Al Oerter	USA	60.36
M60 Discus Throw	R Gustavsson	SWE	45.58
M70 Discus Throw	V Andersson	SWE	38.00
M75 Discus Throw	M Cullen	Wales	31.58
M40 Javelin Throw	Urs von Wartburg	SUI	78.66
M70 Javelin Throw	E Curtice	USA	37.48
M75 Javelin Throw	Herb Anderson	USA	27.48
