= 1983 World Masters Athletics Championships =

Coordinates: 18.465278°N 66.088889°W

- Dates: 23-30 September 1983
- Host city: San Juan, Puerto Rico
- Venue: Estadio Sixto Escobar
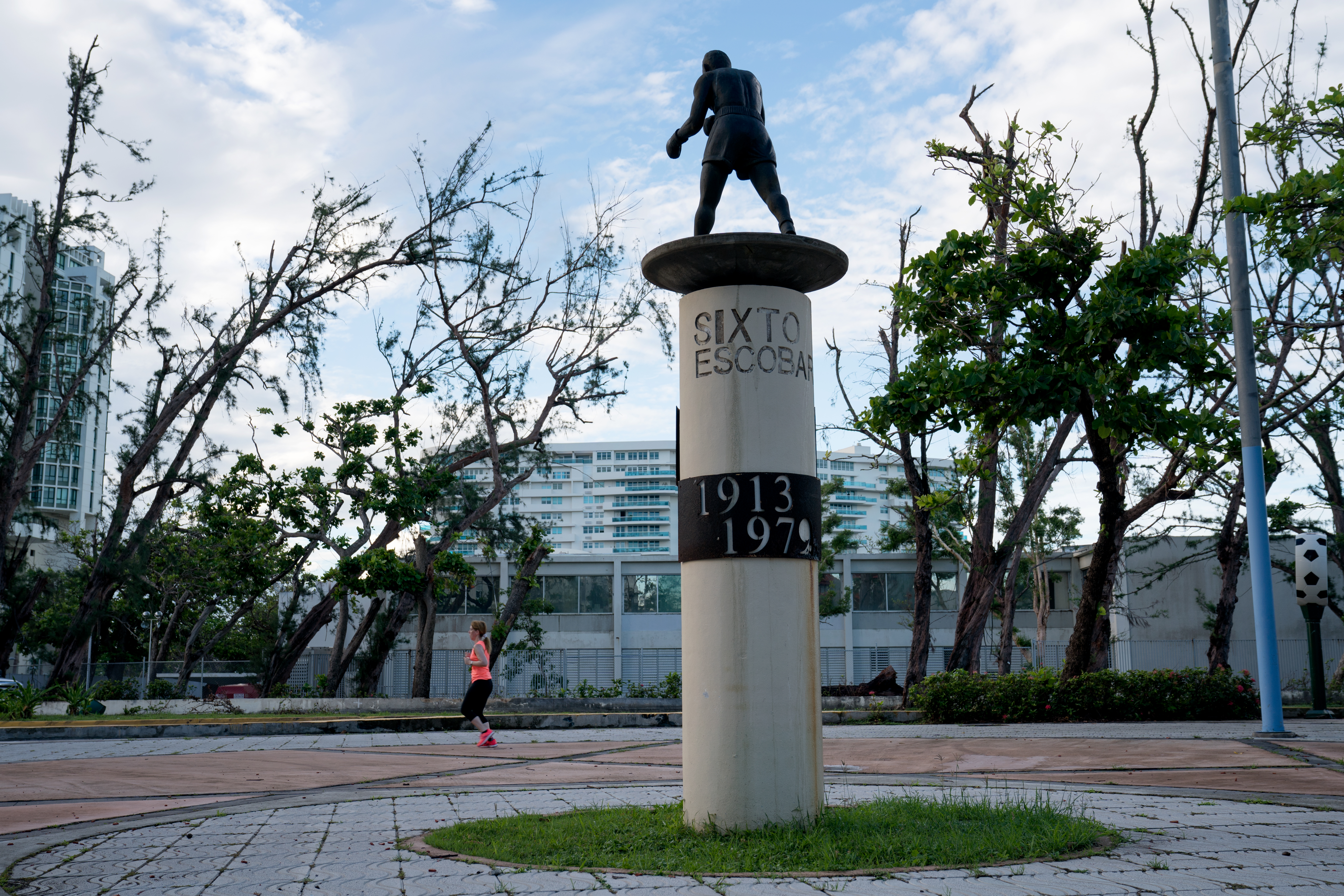
- Level: Masters
- Type: Outdoor
- Participation: 1935 athletes from 47 nations

Masters Mundiales Atletismo 1983

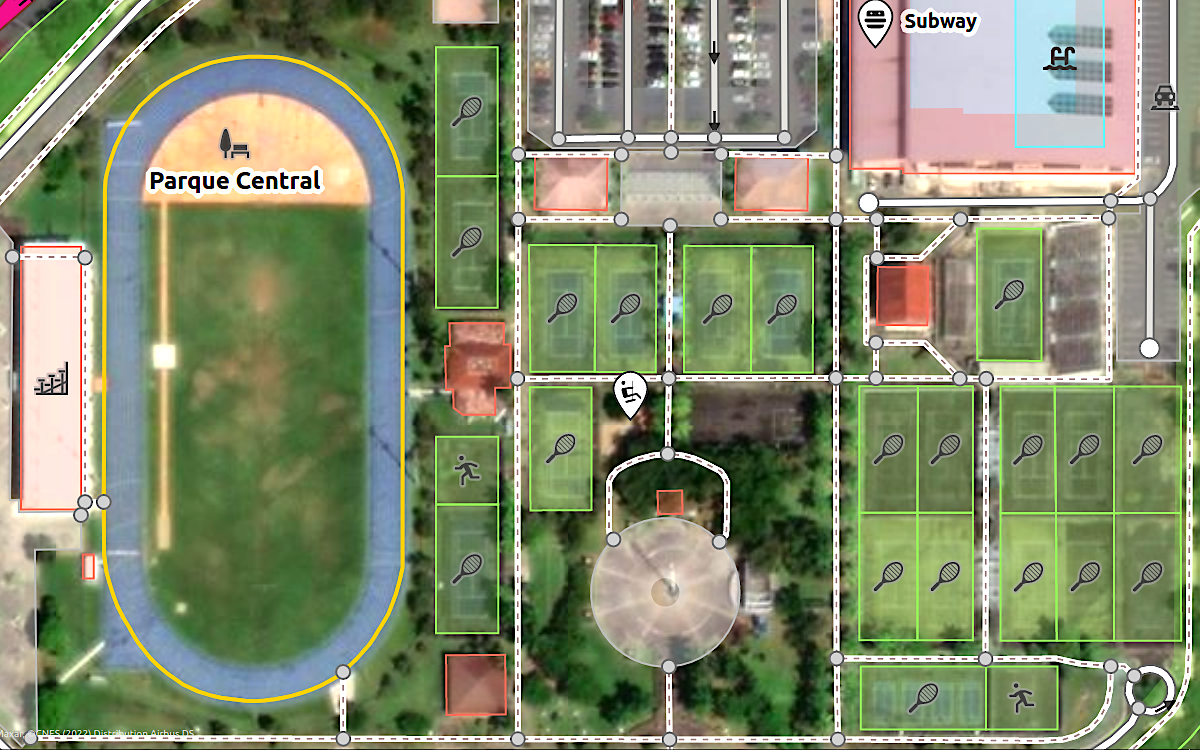
Parque Central

1983 World Masters Athletics Championships is the fifth in a series of World Masters Athletics Outdoor Championships (called World Veterans Games or World Masters Games at the time) that took place in San Juan, Puerto Rico, from 23 to 30 September 1983.

The main venue was Estadio Sixto Escobar, while Parque Central hosted most field events. Opening ceremonies were held at Hiram Bithorn Stadium. The mascot was the jicotea, a freshwater turtle sacred to the indigenous Taíno peoples.

This edition of masters athletics Championships had a minimum age limit of 35 years for women and 40 years for men.

The governing body of this series is World Association of Veteran Athletes (WAVA). WAVA was formed during meeting at the inaugural edition of this series at Toronto in 1975, then officially founded during the second edition in 1977, then renamed as World Masters Athletics (WMA) at the Brisbane Championships in 2001.

This Championships was organized by WAVA in coordination with a Local Organising Committee (LOC) led by José F. Méndez, with San Juan Mayor Hernán Padilla serving as "Patron of the Games".

In addition to a full range of track and field events, non-stadia events included 10K Cross Country, 10K Race Walk (women), 20K Race Walk (men), and Marathon. The relays were run as unofficial events on the final day, since the WAVA by-laws had been amended at the 1981 Championships to suspend relays in 1983.

As an experiment, there will he no relays in Puerto Rico. The reason being that the host countries usually dominate by sheer numbers and the smaller countries just don't have enough competitors to comprise a team.

== Controversy ==
Funding for this Championships from the Puerto Rico Commonwealth was withheld by Governor Carlos Romero Barcelo, a political rival of Mayor Padilla, ostensibly over concerns of South Africa participation due to the apartheid policy of the South African government at that time. South African athletes were officially banned from this Championships by the Puerto Rican government, despite the IAAF constitution that prohibits discrimination because of national origin.

Many proceedings of the Championships were poorly organized, partly as a consequence of this political dispute. About 30 of the 178 registered South African athletes eventually competed despite the ban, but they were listed under "alternate" countries, as was done at the 1981 Championships in Christchurch.

== World Records ==
Past Championships results are archived at WMA. Additional archives are available from Museum of Masters Track & Field as a pdf book, as a searchable pdf, in pdf newsletters from National Masters News, and also as a pdf booklet of Championships and world records.

Several masters world records were set at this Championships. World records for 1983 are from the Museum of Masters Track & Field searchable pdf unless otherwise noted.

The blind sprinter Fritz Assmy, guided by his son and running his assigned lane 8, defeated Payton Jordan in 2 of 3 events in a memorable dual. Both athletes broke the M65 200m WR in their respective heats, and though Jordan had a faster time of 26.10 in his heat than Assmy's 26.20, Assmy won the final in a non-record time of 26.26 to Jordan's 26.42. Some thought the son had "pulled" or "tugged" Assmy in the first 2 events, the 100m and 200m, but it appeared Assmy was doing the "pulling" in the 400m. Assmy later defended his running technique in the June 1985 National Masters News newsletter.

=== Women ===
Event	Athlete(s)	Nationality	Performance
W55 100 Meters	Lieselotte Seuberlich	FRG	14.36
W60 100 Meters	Paula Schneiderhan	FRG	14.47
W50 200 Meters	Daphne Pirie	AUS	27.65
W55 200 Meters	Lieselotte Seuberlich	FRG	29.59
W60 200 Meters	Paula Schneiderhan	FRG	30.26
W65 200 Meters	Winifred Reid	RSA	33.67
W60 400 Meters	Aileen Hogan	AUS	75.70
W70 400 Meters	Polly Clarke	USA	1:24.23
W60 800 Meters	Erika Werner	FRG	3:00.06
W65 1500 Meters	Britta Tibbling	SWE	6:22.20
W70 1500 Meters	Johanna Luther	FRG	6:47.10
W70 5000 Meters	Johanna Luther	FRG	24:58.26
W70 10000 Meters	Johanna Luther	FRG	51:03.0
W55 Long Jump	Lieselotte Seuberlich	FRG	4.40
W60 Long Jump	Paula Schneiderhan	FRG	4.35
W70 Long Jump	Johanna Gelbrich	FRG	2.97
W55 Shot Put	Marianne Hamm	FRG	11.21
W60 Shot Put	Isuzu Tsujii	JPN	9.95
W75 Shot Put	Irja S.M. Sarnama	FIN	7.77
W70 Discus Throw	Johanna Gelbrich	FRG	20.20
W75 Discus Throw	Irja S.M. Sarnama	FIN	17.04
W70 Javelin Throw	Johanna Gelbrich	FRG	24.97

=== Men ===
Event	Athlete(s)	Nationality	Performance
M45 100 Meters	Ken Dennis	USA	10.92
M50 100 Meters	Andrew Faure	VEN	11.58
M65 100 Meters	Payton Jordan	USA	12.53
M70 100 Meters	Gilberto Gonzalez	PUR	13.44
M80 100 Meters	Konrad Boas	USA	16.40
M45 200 Meters	Reginald Austin	AUS	22.40
M65 200 Meters	Payton Jordan	USA	26.10
M65 200 Meters	Fritz Assmy	FRG	26.20
M80 200 Meters	Konrad Boas	USA	33.75
M40 400 Meters	Manuel Ulacio	VEN	49.00
M45 400 Meters	Reginald Austin	AUS	50.61
M75 5000 Meters	Ed Benham	USA	20:59.0
M50 3000 Meters Steeplechase	Maurice Morrell	GBR	10:00.20
M60 80 Meters Hurdles	Tom Patsalis	USA	15.6
M40 80 Meters Hurdles	Fiorenzo Marchesi	SUI	14.69
M70 80 Meters Hurdles	Robert Reckwardt	FRG	14.09
M55 110 Meters Hurdles	Jack Greenwood	USA	16.15
M55 400 Meters Hurdles	Jack Greenwood	USA	59.85
M70 400 Meters Hurdles	Gilberto Gonzalez	PUR	77.50
M70 Long Jump	Mazumi Morita	JPN	4.83
M75 Long Jump	Gulab Singh	IND	4.28
M70 Triple Jump	Mazumi Morita	JPN	9.79
M50 High Jump	Richard "Dick" Richardson	USA	1.85
M50 Hammer throw	Hans Potsch	AUT	57.40
M70 Hammer throw	Aarne Miettinen	FIN	44.78
M75 Hammer throw	Karsten Brodersen	CHI	39.05
M75 Discus Throw	Karsten Brodersen	CHI	38.76
M60 Javelin Throw	Aloysius Sibidol	BRU	54.51
M70 Javelin Throw	Gerhard Schepe	FRG	41.08
M45 Pentathlon	Werner Schallau	FRG	4,124
