= 1979 World Masters Athletics Championships =

Coordinates: 52.360067°N 9.731197°E

- Dates: 27 July - 2 August, 1979
- Host city: Hannover, Germany
- Venue: Niedersachsenstadion
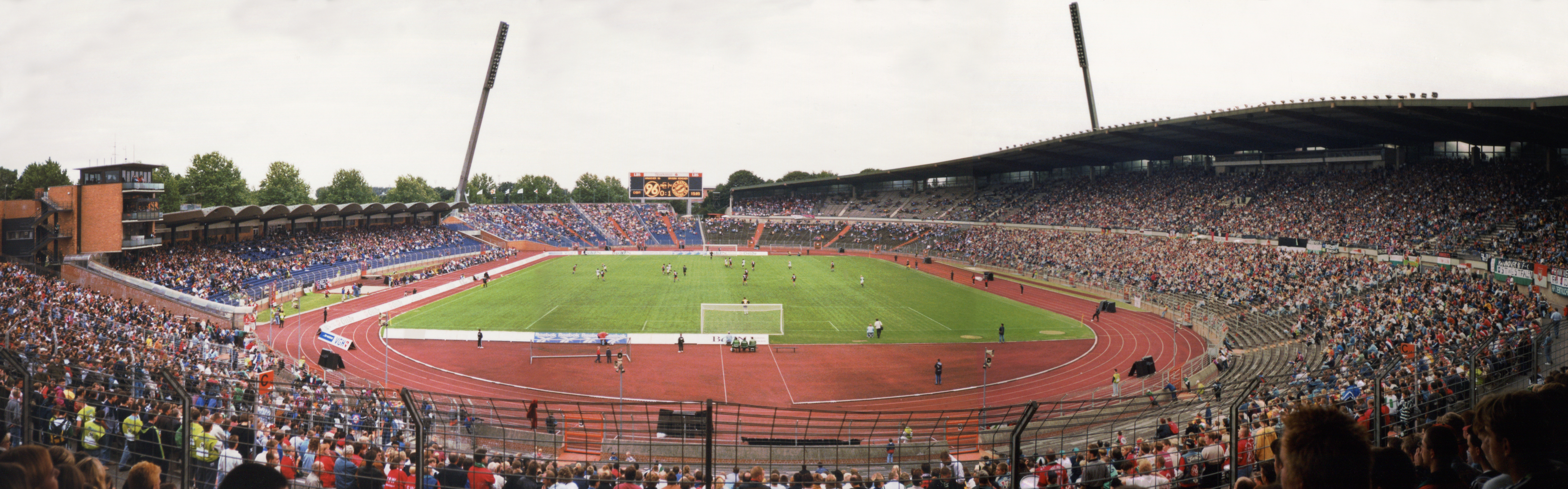
- Level: Masters
- Type: Outdoor
- Participation: 3126 athletes from 42 nations

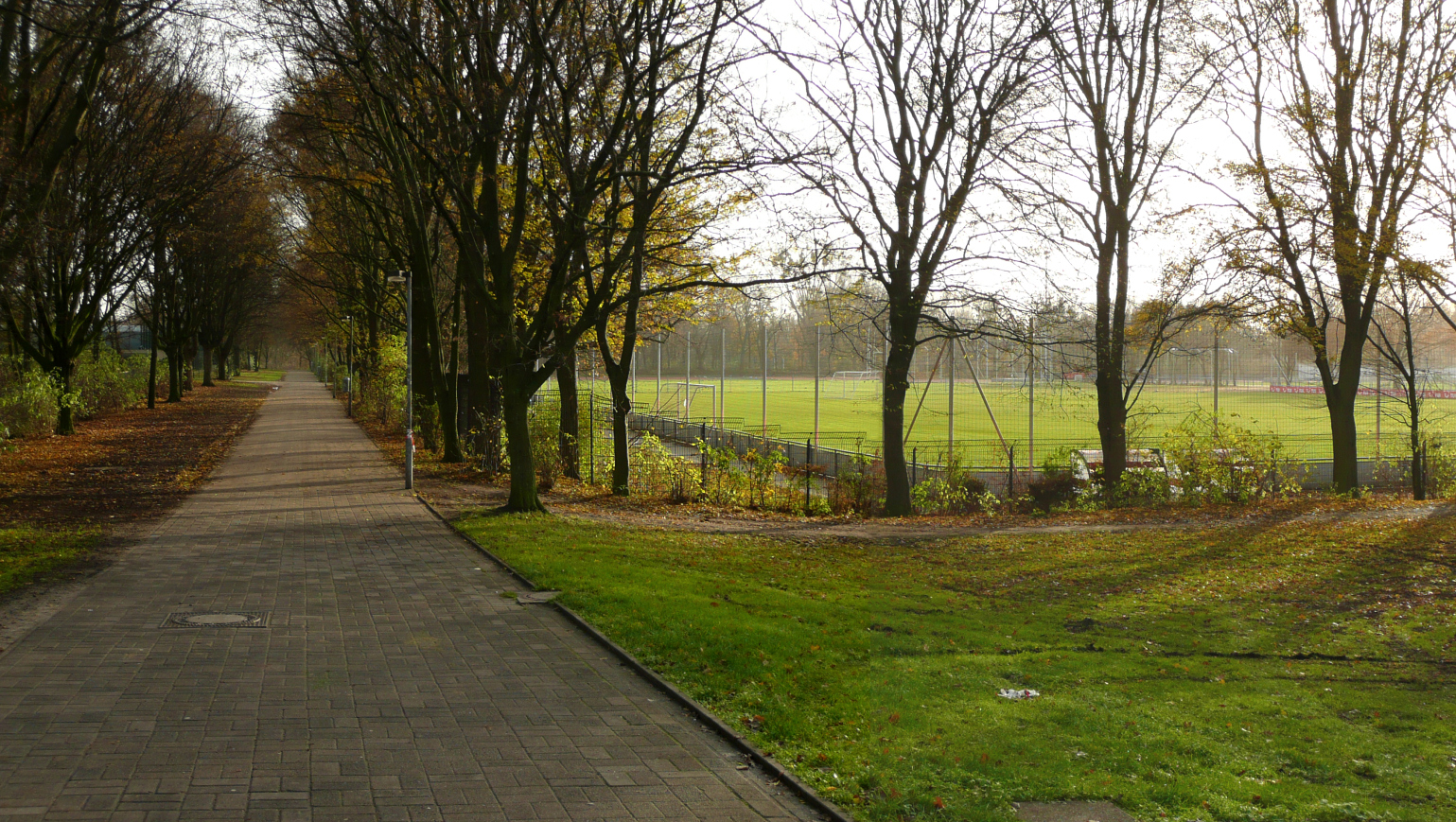
Sportpark Hannover

1979 World Masters Athletics Championships is the third in a series of World Masters Athletics Outdoor Championships (called World Veterans Championships at the time) that took place in Hannover, Germany, from 27 July to 2 August 1979.

The main venue was Niedersachsenstadion (English: Lower Saxony Stadium), which featured a new Olympic-style electronic scoreboard. This stadium has since been rebuilt several times, most extensively in 2003/04. Cross Country was held at Sportpark Hannover (German: Mehrkampfanlage) in Galgenberg.

This edition of masters athletics Championships had a minimum age limit of 35 years for women and 40 years for men.

The governing body of this series is World Association of Veteran Athletes (WAVA). WAVA was formed during meeting at the inaugural edition of this series at Toronto in 1975, then officially founded during the second edition in 1977, then renamed as World Masters Athletics (WMA) at the Brisbane Championships in 2001.

This Championships was organized by WAVA in coordination with a Local Organising Committee (LOC) of German Athletics Association (German: Deutscher Leichtathletik-Verband, DLV) and K. Wilhelm Köster.

In addition to a full range of track and field events, non-stadia events included 10K Cross Country, 10K Race Walk (women), 20K Race Walk (men), and Marathon.

== Controversy ==
In 1976, the International Amateur Athletic Federation (IAAF) had expelled the Amateur Athletic Union of South Africa due to the apartheid policy of the South African government at that time, though the WAVA constitution was written in 1977 to be independent of IAAF, stating that

no competitor be barred because of race, religion, ethnic background, or national origin.

Citing the fact that South Africa had been excluded from the Summer Olympic Games since 1968, DLV meet organizers initially planned to ban South African athletes. After much discussion, a compromise was reached to allow South Africa athletes to compete under the flag of Rhodesia (RHO).

== World Records ==
Past Championships results are archived at WMA. Additional archives are available from Museum of Masters Track & Field as a pdf book, as a searchable pdf, and in pdf newsletters from National Masters News.

Selected winners are archived at Athletics Weekly for women and for men.

Rare photographs of the blind sprinter Fritz Assmy in competition were included in newspaper clippings from the Museum of Masters Track & Field pdf book, guided by his son-in-law Klaus Hinrichsen in lane 8. Assmy won the M60 100m, 200m, and 400m sprints, anchored the German M60 4 x 100 relay team to gold in a Championships Record time of 50.32, and anchored the German M60 4 x 400 relay team to 4th place.

Several masters world records were set at this Championships. John Gilmour (AUS) broke 4 world records by himself. World records for 1979 are from the list of new records in the Museum of Masters Track & Field searchable pdf unless otherwise noted.

=== Women ===
Event	Athlete(s)	Nationality	Performance
W50 200 Meters	Maeve Kyle	IRL	28.04
W45 80 Meters Hurdles	Colleen Mills	NZL	12.87
W35 High Jump	Christel Voss	FRG	1.73
W55 High Jump	Vlasta Chlumská	CZE	1.30
W35 Long Jump	Dorit Breul	FRG	5.59
W50 Long Jump	Maeve Kyle	IRL	5.04
W55 Long Jump	Ilse Pleuger	FRG	3.43
W65 Long Jump	Helga Mitschke	FRG	1.66
W35 Pentathlon	Christel Voss	FRG	4177

=== Men ===
Event	Athlete(s)	Nationality	Performance
M40 100 Meters	Karl Heinz Schröder	FRG	10.95
M45 100 Meters	Lloyd Riddick	USA	11.25
M70 100 Meters	Frederick Reid	RSA	13.80
M50 200 Meters	Clifford Mc Pherson	GUY	23.99
M65 200 Meters	Yngve Brange	SWE	27.24
M70 200 Meters	Frederick Reid	RSA	28.62
M40 400 Meters	Bruno Bianchi	ITA	49.57
M50 400 Meters	Francis Peter Higgins	GBR	52.28
M65 400 Meters	Yngve Brange	SWE	63.19
M60 800 Meters	John Gilmour	AUS	2:19.3
M60 1500 Meters	John Gilmour	AUS	4:32.5
M60 5000 Meters	John Gilmour	AUS	16:54.9
M80 5000 Meters	Josef Galia	FRG	25:26.6
M60 10000 Meters	John Gilmour	AUS	35:07.7
M45 110 Meters Hurdles	Valbjörn Þorláksson	ISL	14.86
M60 110 Meters Hurdles	Alfred Guidet	USA	18.73
M65 110 Meters Hurdles	George Braceland	USA	19.81
M40 400 Meters Hurdles	Leon Hacker	RSA	54.08
M65 400 Meters Hurdles	George Braceland	USA	75.22
M75 400 Meters Hurdles	Herbert F Anderson	USA	90.65
M50 3000 Meters Steeplechase	Arthur H G Taylor	CAN	10:18.1
M55 3000 Meters Steeplechase	Galicia Eligio	MEX	10:39.0
M60 3000 Meters Steeplechase	Olle Elvland	SWE	11:41.6
M50 4 x 100 Meters Relay	H Goelz, Gerhard Baas, H Schlegel, P Mirkes	FRG	46.11
M40 4 x 400 Meters Relay	Leon Hacker, Grujic, D Burger, George Mathe	RHO	3:23.8
M70 4 x 400 Meters Relay	Harold Chapson, Herbert F Anderson, Sydney Madden, Paul Fairbanks	USA	5:14.9
M65 High Jump	Richard O'Rafferty	IRL	1.47
M70 High Jump	Josef Sahlmann	FRG	1.40
M80 High Jump	Sven A Falk	SWE	1.00
M65 Long Jump	Willi Rumig	FRG	5.16
M70 Long Jump	Josef Sahlmann	FRG	4.57
M50 Triple Jump	Carlos Vera Guardia	VEN	13.04
M65 Hammer throw	Aarne Miettinen	FIN	42.68
M75 Hammer throw	Alex Renk	FRG	29.28
M45 Javelin Throw	Jen Smiding	SWE	64.70
M40 Javelin Throw	Urs von Wartburg	SUI	78.98
M50 Javelin Throw	Veikko Javanainen	FIN	56.18
M65 Shot Put	Konstanty Maksimczyk	GBR	13.80
M75 Shot Put	Ernst Korte	FRG	10.80
M65 Discus Throw	Konstanty Maksimczyk	GBR	50.42
M45 Pentathlon	Valbjörn Thorlaksson	ISL	371
M75 Pentathlon	Herbert F Anderson	USA	2430
