= 1981 World Masters Athletics Championships =

Coordinates: 43.491389°S 172.705278°E

- Dates: 7-14 January 1981
- Host city: Christchurch, New Zealand
- Venue: Queen Elizabeth II Park
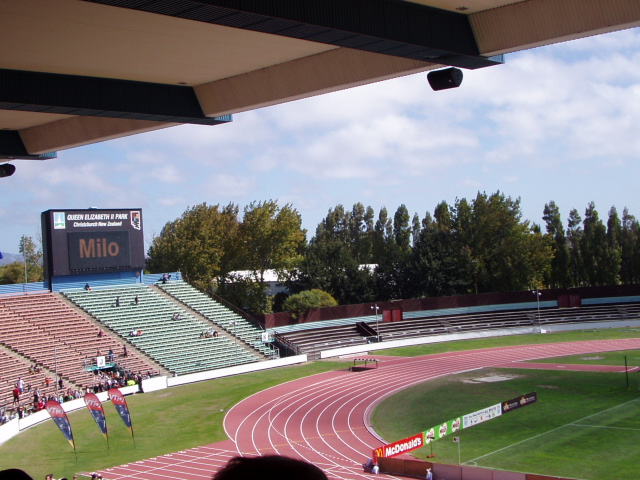
- Level: Masters
- Type: Outdoor
- Participation: 2400 athletes from 44 nations

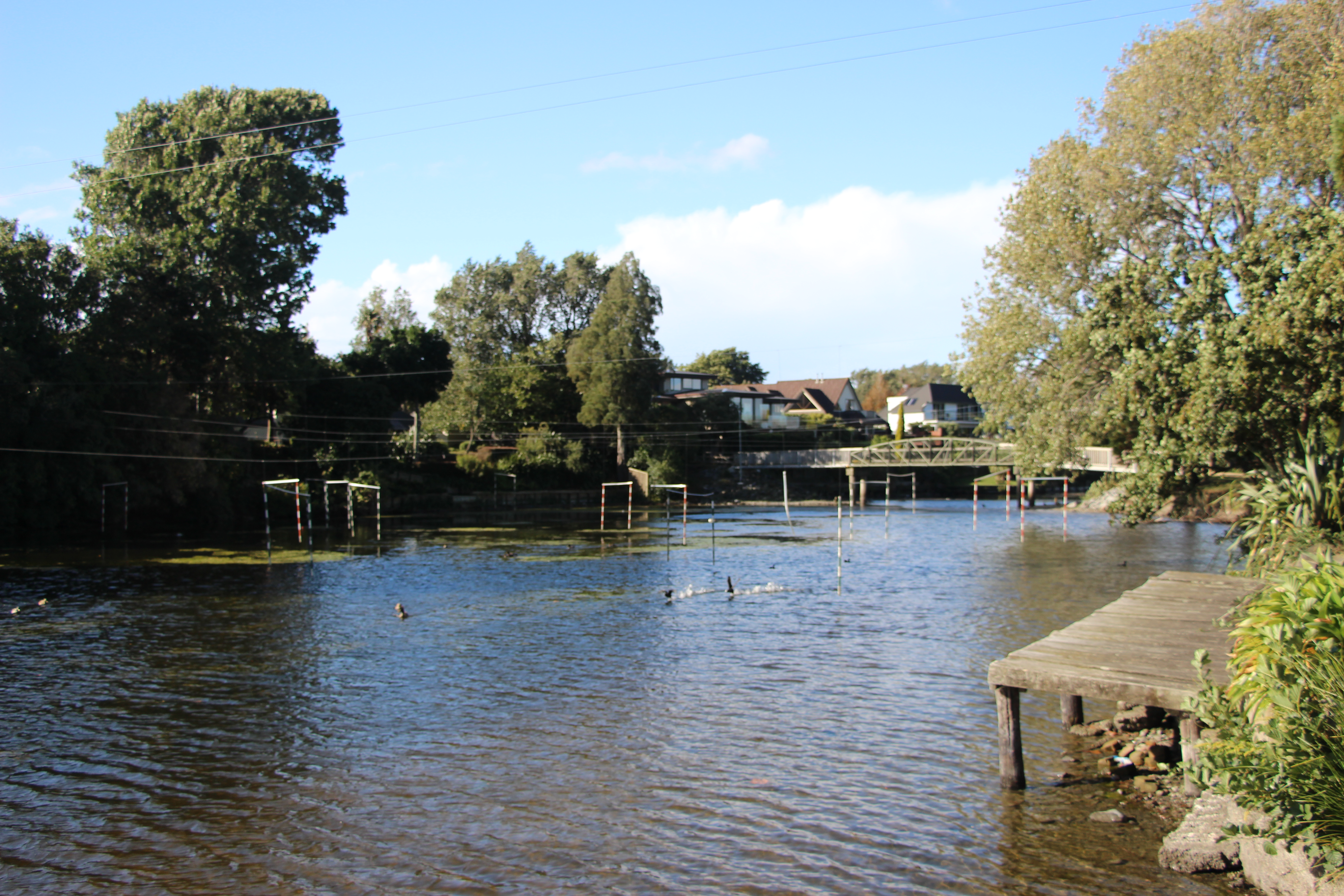
Centennial Lagoon

1981 World Masters Athletics Championships is the fourth in a series of World Masters Athletics Outdoor Championships (called World Veterans Championships, World Veterans Games, or World Veterans Track and Field Championships at the time) that took place in Christchurch, New Zealand, from 7 to 14 January 1981. The turnout was better than expected, despite the remote location, though no Eastern European or third world nations were represented.

The main venue was Queen Elizabeth II Park, which was later destroyed by the 2011 Christchurch earthquake. A grass track outside the stadium was used to hold many running events.

This edition of masters athletics Championships had a minimum age limit of 35 years for women and 40 years for men.

The governing body of this series is World Association of Veteran Athletes (WAVA). WAVA was formed during meeting at the inaugural edition of this series at Toronto in 1975, then officially founded during the second edition in 1977, then renamed as World Masters Athletics (WMA) at the Brisbane Championships in 2001.

This Championships was organized by WAVA in coordination with a Local Organising Committee (LOC) headed by John Macdonald. John Macdonald also ran in the competition and successfully defended his M45 10K title from 1979.

In addition to a full range of track and field events, non-stadia events included 10K Cross Country, 10K Race Walk (women), 20K Race Walk (men), and Marathon. Many distance runners also competed in 10K and 25K road races at the 14th Annual World Veterans Distance Running Championships held around Centennial Lagoon in Palmerston North on 3 - 4 January.

== Controversy ==
In 1976, the International Amateur Athletic Federation (IAAF) had expelled the Amateur Athletic Union of South Africa due to the apartheid policy of the South African government at that time. The Gleneagles Agreement further prohibited South African athletes from participating in sports at Commonwealth member states such as New Zealand, so South Africans were banned from this Championships.

About nine South Africans competed as representatives of HOL, BEL and USA; they are shown with their native RSA flag in the Results Nationality column below. Demonstrations and violence occurred when the press reported the participation of South African athletes. At the Championships General Assembly, a motion to ban South African athletes from future WAVA activities was ruled "out of order" since the WAVA constitution states that membership is open to all men and women of eligible age.

WAVA did not expect such troubles at the next World Games scheduled for 1983 in San Juan, Puerto Rico, but Puerto Rican politics eventually would make South African participation an issue as well. After the end of the apartheid system, South Africa officially rejoined IAAF in 1992.

== World Records ==
Past Championships results are archived at WMA. Additional archives are available from Museum of Masters Track & Field as a pdf book and in pdf newsletters from World Association of Veteran Athletes and from National Masters News.

Several masters world records were set at this Championships. World records for 1981 are from the National Masters News newsletter (length measurements are converted from feet to meters) unless otherwise noted. Among the notable performances, John Gilmour broke his own M60 WR for the 4th time, and the blind sprinter Fritz Assmy won the M65 100m and 200m, again guided by his son-in-law Klaus Hinrichsen as he was in 1979. A photograph of Assmy running with his son-in-law is included in the pdf book.

=== Women ===
Event	Athlete(s)	Nationality	Performance
W60 100 Meters	Elizabeth Haule	FRG	16.01
W70 100 Meters	Bess James	USA	19.58
W75 100 Meters	Irja Sarnama	FIN	19.25
W45 200 Meters	Irene Obera	USA	26.21
W55 200 Meters	Kirsten Hveem	NOR	30.59
W60 200 Meters	Elizabeth Haule	FRG	33.62
W70 200 Meters	Bess James	USA	45.11
W75 200 Meters	Irja Sarnama	FIN	42.66
W45 400 Meters	Colleen Mills	NZL	59.68
W55 400 Meters	Anne McKenzie	RSA	71.91
W65 400 Meters	Winifred Reid	RSA	79.66
W70 400 Meters	Bess James	USA	96.65
W75 400 Meters	Ruth Rothfarb	USA	2:03.50
W55 800 Meters	Anne McKenzie	RSA	2:43.41
W60 800 Meters	Britta Tibbling	SWE	3:00.95
W65 800 Meters	S.E. Pearce	NZL	3:34.62
W70 800 Meters	Bess James	USA	3:53.34
W75 800 Meters	Ruth Rothfarb	USA	4:30.08
W70 1500 Meters	Bess James	USA	7:93.42
W75 1500 Meters	Ruth Rothfarb	USA	8:47.78
W45 5000 Meters	Maria Pia d'Orlando	ITA	18:09.03
W45 10000 Meters	Dorothy Stock	USA	38:49.15
W60 10000 Meters	E. Falke	FRG	50:13.84
W65 10000 Meters	W. Kretschmer	FRG	55:20.8
W70 10000 Meters	Ailsa Forbes	NZL	59:20.6
W75 10000 Meters	Ruth Rothfarb	USA	1:01:56
W50 5K Race Walk	M. Ohlsson	SWE	28:46.06
W55 5K Race Walk	Marj Colthup	AUS	30:48.20
W60 5K Race Walk	Britta Tibbling	SWE	28:39.80
W65 High Jump	Annchen Reile	FRG	1.11
W65 Long Jump	Rosaline Sole	NZL	3.40
W75 Shot Put	Irja Sarnama	FIN	6.90
W45 Discus Throw	Odete Valentino Domingos	BRA	48.24
W65 Discus Throw	Annchen Reile	FRG	26.54
W75 Discus Throw	Irja Sarnama	FIN	15.26
W45 Javelin Throw	A. Brommel	FRG	43.16
W50 Javelin Throw	S. White	AUS	36.22
W75 Javelin Throw	Irja Sarnama	FIN	18.27

=== Men ===
Event	Athlete(s)	Nationality	Performance
M65 200 Meters	Fritz Assmy	FRG	26.32
M55 800 Meters	Frank Evans	NZL	2:08.66
M60 800 Meters	John Gilmour	AUS	2:16.98
M60 800 Meters	George McGrath	AUS	2:17.54
M70 80 Meters Hurdles	W. Bigelow	USA	84.09
M70 3000 Meters Steeplechase	W. Bigelow	USA	14:34.54
M75 Long Jump	Gulab Singh	IND	4.27
M65 Triple Jump	Ian Hume	CAN	10.66
M75 Triple Jump	Gulab Singh	IND	8.72
M50 High Jump	John C. Brown	USA	1.75
M75 Discus Throw	V. Anderson	SWE	35.58
