= Fritz Assmy =

German masters athlete

- Assmy guided by his grandson, 1991

Personal information
- Born: 11 June 1915 Hankou, China
- Died: 11 June 2000 (aged 84)

Sport
- Country: GER
- Sport: Masters athletics
- Event: Sprints

Assmy with his son as guide, 1985

Fritz Assmy (11 June 1915 – 11 June 2000) was a blind Chinese-German masters athletics sprinter. He has set numerous masters world records in sprint events from 100 to 400 meters. Born in Hankou, China to Paul Assmy and Shun King Liu, he migrated to Germany at the age of nine.

Assmy had run the 100 Meters in 11.1 at age 18 (1933). By comparison, the 100 Meters Olympic winning time was 10.3 in both 1932 (by Eddie Tolan) and in 1936 (by Jesse Owens).

== Blindness ==
In his youth, Assmy planned to be a civilian pilot and joined the German Air Force before World War II as a start for an aviation career. In those pre-war years he had also participated in other sports, including soccer, handball, swimming. In 1938, he crashed on a training flight in a Henschel Hs 123 fighter plane at Württemberg, and lost his vision in both eyes at the age of 23.

Around 1971, Assmy realized that blindness need not keep him out of active sport and resumed training, first in gymnastics, then in track and field.

During competition he was guided by a sighted runner with a short rope tethered to their wrists, running in the outer lane to avoid getting in the way of other competitors.

His most notable achievements in athletics were at the World Masters Athletics Outdoor Championships, from 1977 to 1991. In his first 3 WMA Championships (1977, 1979, 1981), he was guided by his son-in-law Klaus Hinrichsen. Then, after his daughter and son-in-law split up, he switched to his son as the guide for 1983 and 1985, and then to his grandson in 1991.

Some claimed his guide had "pulled" or "tugged" Assmy in some events, giving him an unfair advantage. In a response to such criticisms, Assmy defended his running technique in a letter published in the June 1985 National Masters News newsletter.

== Masters World Records ==
| Event | Age group | Competition | Location | Date | Time |
|---|---|---|---|---|---|
| 100 Meters | M75 | 1991 World Masters Athletics Championships | Turku, Finland | July 1991 | 14.06 |
| 100 Meters | M75 | | Trier, Germany | 16 August 1991 | 13.64 |
| 100 Meters | M80 | | Minden, Germany | 19 August 1995 | 14.66 |
| 200 Meters | M60 | 1977 World Masters Athletics Championships | Gothenburg, Sweden | August 1977 | 26.0 |
| 200 Meters | M65 | 1980 European Masters Athletics Championships | Helsinki, Finland | August 1980 | 27.18 |
| 200 Meters | M65 | 1981 World Masters Athletics Championships | Christchurch, New Zealand | 11 January 1981 | 26.32 |
| 200 Meters | M65 | 1983 World Masters Athletics Championships | San Juan, Puerto Rico | 23 September 1983 | 26.20 |
| 200 Meters | M75 | 1990 European Masters Athletics Championships | Budapest, Hungary | 5 July 1990 | 28.60 |
| 200 Meters | M80 | | Minden, Germany | 20 August 1995 | 31.08 |
| 400 Meters | M65 | 1980 European Masters Athletics Championships | Helsinki, Finland | August 1980 | 62.6 |
| 400 Meters | M75 | 1990 European Masters Athletics Championships | Budapest, Hungary | 1 July 1990 | 68.24 |
