= Masters W55 800 metres world record progression =

This is the progression of world record improvements of the 800 metres W55 division of Masters athletics.

Key

Incomplete information Pending

| Hand | Auto | Athlete | Nationality | Birthdate | Location | Date |
|---|---|---|---|---|---|---|
| | 2:19.63 | Anne Gilshinan | Ireland | 6 April 1964 | Dublin | 8 June 2019 |
| | 2:21.98 | Jeanette Flynn | Australia | 4 November 1951 | Brisbane | 11 March 2007 |
| | 2:22.47 | Carolyn Jane Oxton | United Kingdom | 21 August 1943 | Bedford | 30 August 1998 |
| | 2:30.53 | Jane Arnold | United States | 22 November 1940 | Bloomfield | 8 June 1996 |
| | 2:31.0 | Gerda van Kooten | Netherlands | 1 April 1939 | Breda | 12 April 1994 |
| | 2:37.42 | Edeltraud Pohl | Germany | 14 July 1936 | Turku | 23 July 1991 |
| | 2:43.41 | Anne McKenzie | South Africa | 28 July 1925 | Christchurch | 10 Jan 1981 |
