= Masters M45 400 metres hurdles world record progression =

This is the progression of world record improvements of the 400 metres hurdles M45 division of Masters athletics.

Key

Incomplete information Pending

Hand	Auto	Athlete	Nationality	Birthdate	Age	Location	Date	Ref
	53.57	Aramis Diaz	Italy	22 November 1974	45 years, 288 days	Rome	5 September 2020	
	53.90	Aramis Diaz	Italy	22 November 1974	45 years, 281 days	Padua	29 August 2020	
	54.92	Edward Betts	Great Britain	18 February 1971	45 years, 142 days	Palencia	9 July 2016	
	55.18	Guido Müller	Germany	22 December 1938	47 years, 222 days	Malmö	1 August 1986	
55.7 h		Jack Greenwood	United States	5 February 1926	46 years, 201 days	San Diego	24 August 1972	
