= Masters W45 3000 metres world record progression =

This is the progression of world record improvements of the 3000 metres W45 division of Masters athletics. Records must be set in properly conducted, official competitions under the standing IAAF rules unless modified by World Masters Athletics. The W45 division consists of female athletes who have reached the age of 45 but have not yet reached the age of 50, so exactly from their 45th birthday to the day before their 50th birthday.

Key

Incomplete information Pending better indoor records

Hand	Auto	Athlete	Nationality	Birthdate	Location	Date
	9:17.27	Yekaterina Podkopaeva	Russia	11 June 1952	Munich	22 June 1997
	9:11.67i	Nicole Leveque	France	27.01.1951	Paris	11.02.1996
	9:31.38	Evy Palm	Sweden	31 January 1942	Malmö	7 July 1987
	9:34.00	Evy Palm	Sweden	31 January 1942	Nyköping	23 May 1987
