= Masters W40 1500 metres world record progression =

This is the progression of world record improvements of the 1500 metres W40 division of Masters athletics.

Key

Incomplete information Pending

Hand	Auto	Athlete	Nationality	Birthdate	Location	Date
	3:59.78	Yekaterina Podkopayeva	Russia	11.06.1952	Nice	01.06.1994
4:20.7		Joyce Smith	United Kingdom	26.10.1937	Crystal Palace	24.05.1978
4:36.0		Anne McKenzie	South Africa	28.07.1925	Solingen	20.07.1967
