= Masters M70 100 metres world record progression =

This is the progression of world record improvements of the 100 metres M70 division of Masters athletics.

Key

Incomplete information Wind aided Pending

Hand	Auto	Wind	Athlete	Nationality	Birthdate	Age	Location	Date	Ref
	12.59	(−0.2 m/s)	Damien Leake	United States	21 August 1952	70 years, 279 days	Los Angeles	27 May 2023	
	12.66	(+2.4 m/s)	Michael Kish	United States	1952	70	Tampere	30 June 2022	
	12.77	(+1.8 m/s)	Robert Whilden	United States	20 May 1935	70 years, 21 days	Pittsburgh	10 June 2005	
	12.91	NWI	Payton Jordan	United States	19 March 1917	74 years, 95 days	Norwalk	22 June 1991	
	12.72	w	Payton Jordan	United States	19 March 1917	70 years, 256 days	Melbourne	30 November 1987	
	13.07	NWI	Frederick Reid	South Africa	29 June 1909	71 years, 314 days		9 May 1981	
13.5 h		NWI	Frederick Reid	South Africa	3 August 1909	70 years, 351 days	Los Angeles	19 July 1980	
14.5 h		NWI	Winfield McFaden	United States					
