= Masters W40 10000 metres world record progression =

This is the progression of world record improvements of the 10000 metres W40 division of Masters athletics.

Key

Incomplete information Pending

Hand	Auto	Athlete	Nationality	Birthdate	Location	Date
	31:25.49	Sinead Diver	Australia	17 February 1977	Doha	28 September 2019
	31:31.18	Edith Masai	Kenya	4 April 1967	Alger	21 July 2007
	32:12.07	Nicole Leveque	France	27 January 1951	Helsinki	13 August 1994
	32:14.48	Nicole Leveque	France	27 January 1951	St. Maur	13 July 1994
	32:47.25	Evy Palm	Sweden	31 January 1942	Oslo	5 June 1986
	33:00.78	Evy Palm	Sweden	31 January 1942	Oslo	27 July 1985
	33:59.59	Evy Palm	Sweden	31 January 1942	Oslo	15 June 1985
34:26.4		Joyce Smith	United Kingdom	26 October 1937	London	27 February 1980
