= Masters M60 200 metres world record progression =

This is the progression of world record improvements of the 200 metres M60 division of Masters athletics.

Key

Incomplete information Wind aided Pending

| Hand | Auto | Wind | Athlete | Nationality | Birthdate | Age | Location | Date | Ref |
|---|---|---|---|---|---|---|---|---|---|
| | 24.00 | (−0.3 m/s) | Ron Taylor | Great Britain | 4 December 1933 | 60 years, 188 days | Athens | 10 June 1994 | |
| | 24.71 | | Peter Mirkes | Germany | 25 September 1927 | 60 years, 278 days | Verona | 29 June 1988 | |
| 24.9 | | | Payton Jordan | United States | 19.03.1917 | | 19.06.1977 | | |
| | 25.19 | | Josè Luis Ubarri | Puerto Rico | 19.03.1924 | Raleigh | 10.05.1984 | | |
