= Masters W45 10000 metres world record progression =

This is the progression of world record improvements of the 10000 metres W45 division of Masters athletics.

Key

Incomplete information Pending

Hand	Auto	Athlete	Nationality	Birthdate	Location	Date
	32:34.05	Evy Palm	Sweden	31.01.1942	Helsinki	04.09.1988
	32:38.54	Nicole Leveque	France	27.01.1951	Saint-Cloud	15.06.1996
34:29.7		Antoinette Burleigh	France	15.04.1949	La Flèche	16.04.1994
	35:56.20	Eleanor Robinson	United Kingdom	20.11.1947	Birmingham	18.07.1993
36:11.0		Meeri Bodelid	Sweden	23.12.1943	Long Beach	14.09.1991
	36:12.18	Barbara Lehmann	Germany	02.04.1942	Neustadt	10.06.1990
	36:41.04	Anne Marie Grüner	Germany	26.05.1940	Rome	22.06.1985
