= Masters W45 marathon world record progression =

Masters W45 marathon world record progression is the progression of world record improvements of the marathon W45 division of Masters athletics. Records must be set in properly conducted, official competitions under the standing IAAF rules unless modified by World Masters Athletics. The W45 division consists of female athletes who have reached the age of 45 but have not yet reached the age of 50, so exactly from their 45th birthday to the day before their 50th birthday. Marathon running is not normally seeded into age divisions so all of these records were set in marathon race open to most other age groups.

== Progression ==
Key

Incomplete information Pending

Time	Athlete	Nationality	Birthdate	Location	Date
2:21:34	Sinead Diver	Australia	17.07.1977	Valencia	4.12.2022
2:28:34	Catherine Bertone	Italy	06.05.1972	Berlin	23.09.2017
2:29:00a	Tatyana Pozdniakova	Ukraine	04.03.1955	Providence	13.10.2002
2:30:26a	Tatyana Pozdniakova	Ukraine	04.03.1955	Los Angeles	03.03.2002
2:30:28a	Tatyana Pozdniakova	Ukraine	04.03.1955	Providence	08.10.2001
2:30:51	Colleen de Reuck	United States	13.04.1964	Copenhagen	23.05.2010
2:31:05	Evy Palm	Sweden	31.01.1942	London	23.04.1989
2:31:35	Evy Palm	Sweden	31.01.1942	London	17.04.1988
2:32:48a	Joyce Smith	United Kingdom	26.10.1937	Los Angeles	05.08.1984
2:34:27	Joyce Smith	United Kingdom	26.10.1937	Helsinki	07.08.1983
2:34:39a	Joyce Smith	United Kingdom	26.10.1937	Los Angeles	05.06.1983
2:38:04	Joyce Smith	United Kingdom	26.10.1937	Rome	24.04.1983
2:40:01	Joyce Smith	United Kingdom	26.10.1937	Osaka	30.01.1983
2:46:13	Maria Pia d'Orlando	Italy	02.11.1934	Verona	09.05.1982
2:48:46	Maria Pia d'Orlando	Italy	02.11.1934	Agen	13.09.1981
2:49:03	Maria Pia d'Orlando	Italy	02.11.1934	Rieti	12.10.1980

== See also ==
- List of world records in masters athletics - Marathon Women
