= Masters W50 3000 metres world record progression =

This is the progression of world record improvements of the 3000 metres W50 division of Masters athletics. Records must be set in properly conducted, official competitions under the standing IAAF rules unless modified by World Masters Athletics. The W50 division consists of female athletes who have reached the age of 50 but have not yet reached the age of 55, so exactly from their 50th birthday to the day before their 55th birthday.

Key

Incomplete information Pending

Hand	Auto	Athlete	Nationality	Birthdate	Location	Date
	9:47.20	Gitte Karlshøj	Denmark	14 May 1959	Aarhus	19 May 2009
	10:08.83	Paula Fudge	United Kingdom	30 March 1952	Hendon	3 August 2002
	10:17.41	Nicole Leveque	France	27 January 1951	Saumur	5 May 2002
	10:26.42	Jutta Pedersen	Sweden	6 December 1946	Sollentuna	2 June 2001
