= Masters W50 800 metres world record progression =

This is the progression of world record improvements of the 800 metres W50 division of Masters Athletics.

Key

Incomplete information Pending

Hand	Auto	Athlete	Nationality	Birthdate	Age	Location	Date	Ref
	2:12.50	Eva Trost	Germany	30 January 1968	50 years, 185 days	Neustadt	3 August 2018	
	2:13.05	Nicole Weijling-Dissel	Netherlands	16 June 1967	50 years, 0 days	Soest	16 June 2017	
	2:16.05	Jeanette Flynn	Australia	4 November 1951	53 years, 86 days	Brisbane	29 January 2005	
	2:16.62	Maureen de St. Croix	Canada	26 May 1953	50 years, 22 days	Burnaby	17 June 2003	
	2:20.01	Gail Kirkman	New Zealand	8 December 1951	50 years, 99 days	Wellington	17 March 2002	
	2:21.05	Barbara Lehmann	Germany	2 April 1942	50 years, 51 days	Ebersberg	23 May 1992	
2:23.1 h		Anne McKenzie	South Africa	28 July 1925	50 years, 93 days		29 October 1975	
