= Masters M65 discus world record progression =

Masters M65 discus world record progression is the progression of world record improvements of the discus M65 division of Masters athletics. Records must be set in properly conducted, official competitions under the standing IAAF rules unless modified by World Masters Athletics. The M65 division consists of male athletes who have reached the age of 65 but have not yet reached the age of 70, so exactly from their 65th birthday to the day before their 70th birthday. The M65 division throws a 1 kg implement.

Key

Incomplete information Pending

Distance	Athlete	Nationality	Birthdate	Location	Date
59.75	Klaus Liedtke	Germany	05.01.1941	Oer-Erkenschwick	17.08.2007
59.45	Klaus Albers	Germany	12.01.1940	Bremerhaven	27.04.2005
55.64	Konstanty Maksimczyk	United Kingdom	10.06.1914	Bristol	17.09.1979
50.42	Konstanty Maksimczyk	United Kingdom	10.06.1914	Hanover	29.07.1979
48.18	Olav Reppen	Norway	09.07.1911	Brønnøysund	10.08.1978
