= Masters M65 100 metres hurdles world record progression =

This is the progression of world record improvements of the 100 metres hurdles M65 division of Masters athletics.

Key

Incomplete information Wind aided Pending

Hand	Auto	Wind	Athlete	Nationality	Birthdate	Location	Date	Ref
	15.08	+1.0	Peter Grimes	United States	10 February 1959	Sacramento	19 July 2024	
	15.20	-1.1	Tyrone Brown	United States	9 February 1945	Raleigh	18 May 2013	
	15.26		Tyrone Brown	United States	9 February 1945	Charlotte	10 April 2010	
	15.48	+0.4	Tyrone Brown	United States	9 February 1945	Sacramento	22.07.2010	
	15.47	+0.3	Rolf Geese	Germany	19.02.1944	Lahti	28.07.2009	
	15.60	+0.9	Guido Müller	Germany	22.12.1938	Arhus	30.07.2004	
	15.86	-0.3	Günther Ortmann	Germany	05.04.1936	Potsdam	17.08.2001	
	16.22		Jack Greenwood	United States	05.02.1926	Naperville	05.07.1991	
16.8			Tom Patsalis	United States	06.12.1931	Huntington Beach	30.05.1987	
	17.09		Robert Hunt	United States	18.05.1920	Indianapolis	20.08.1985	
20.9			R. Lacey	United States		Gothenburg	12.08.1977	
