= Masters W40 5000 metres world record progression =

This is the progression of world record improvements of the 5000 metres W35 division of Masters athletics.

Key

Incomplete information Pending

Hand	Auto	Athlete	Nationality	Birthdate	Location	Date
	15:04.87	Joanne Pavey	United Kingdom	20.09.1973	Rome	05.06.2014
	15:08.96	Joanne Pavey	United Kingdom	20.09.1973	Glasgow	02.08.2014
	15:20.59	Elena Fidatov	Romania	24.07.1960	Bucharest	07.08.2000
	15:51.81	Nicole Leveque	France	27.01.1951	Bonneuil-sur-Marne	18.06.1994
	16:02.88	Evy Palm	Sweden	31.01.1942	Oslo	17.07.1985
	16:44.28	Gabriela Andersen-Schiess	United States	20.03.1945	Rome	27.06.1985
17.09.1		Dot Browne	Australia	06.02.1941	Melbourne	02.04.1983
