= Masters M65 high jump world record progression =

This is the progression of world record improvements of the high jump M65 division of Masters athletics.

Key

Incomplete information Pending

Height	Athlete	Nationality	Birthdate	Location	Date
1.66	Phil Fehlen	United States	03.07.1935	Eugene	12.08.2000
1.64	James Gillcrist	United States	28.10.1927	Gainesville	25.09.1993
1.55	Hans Bitter	West Germany	22.02.1920	Rome	23.06.1985
1.51	Ian Hume	Canada	20.08.1914	Richmond	22.08.1981
