= Masters M75 800 metres world record progression =

This is the progression of world record improvements of the 800 metres M75 division of Masters athletics.

Key

Incomplete information Pending better indoor records

Hand	Auto	Athlete	Nationality	Birthdate	Location	Date	Ref
	2:30.59	Jose Vicente Rioseco Lopez	Spain	30.04.1941	Vilagarcia	16.06.2018	
	2:32.47 i	Earl Fee	Canada	22.03.1929	Boston	26.03.2004	
2:34.3		David Carr	Australia	15.06.1932	Perth	26.07.2007	
	2:36.28	Earl Fee	Canada	22.03.1929	San Sebastian	29.08.2005	
2:40.0		Harold Chapson	United States	11.07.1902	Eugene	14.05.1978	
2:41.4		Harold Chapson	United States	11.07.1902	Gothenburg	12.08.1977	
