= Masters W40 800 metres world record progression =

This is the progression of world record improvements of the 800 metres W40 division of Masters athletics.

Key

Incomplete information Pending

Hand	Auto	Athlete	Nationality	Birthdate	Location	Date
	1:59.25	Yekaterina Podkopayeva	Russia	11.06.1952	Luxembourg	30.06.1994
	2:05.46A	Sara Montecinos	Chile	08.03.1954	Cali	19.03.1994
2:06.5		Anne McKenzie	South Africa	28.07.1925	London	01.07.1967
