= Masters M80 400 metres world record progression =

This is the progression of world record improvements of the 400 metres M80 division of Masters athletics.

Key

Incomplete information Pending

Hand	Auto	Athlete	Nationality	Birthdate	Location	Date
	1:10.01	Hijiya Hisamitsu	Japan	01.09.1931	Miyazaki	09.09.2012
	1:10.27	Hiroo Tanaka	Japan	08.12.1930	Tanzawa	19.06.2011
	1:10.64	Earl Fee	Canada	22.03.1929	Raleigh	01.05.2009
	1:12.85	Mike Johnston	Australia	1921	Adelaide	01.04.2002
	1:15.4	Harold Chapson	United States	11.07.1902	Honolulu	09.07.1983
