= Masters M80 800 metres world record progression =

This is the progression of world record improvements of the 800 metres M80 division of Masters athletics.

Key

Incomplete information Pending

Hand	Auto	Athlete	Nationality	Birthdate	Location	Date
2:41.59		Jose Vicente Rioseco Lopez	Spain	30 April 1941	A Coruña	30 April 2021
2:48.5		David Carr	Australia	15 June 1932	Perth	26 February 2013
	2:48.95	Earl Fee	Canada	22 March 1929	Toronto	21 June 2009
2:49.0		David Carr	Australia	15 June 1932	Perth	14 June 2012
	2:49.30	Earl Fee	Canada	22 March 1929	Sydney	11 October 2009
2:49.4		Harold Chapson	United States	11 July 1902	Honolulu	9 October 1983
2:53.5		Harold Chapson	United States	11 July 1902		11 July 1982
