= Masters M50 100 metres hurdles world record progression =

This is the progression of world record improvements of the 100 metres hurdles M50 division of Masters athletics.

Key

Incomplete information Wind aided Pending

Hand	Auto	Wind	Athlete	Nationality	Birthdate	Location	Date
	13.57		Walt Butler	United States	21.03.1941	Naperville	05.07.1991
	13.71		Walt Butler	United States	21.03.1941	Norwalk	22.06.1991
	14.66		Charles Miller	United States	28.07.1937	Eugene	03.08.1989
14.7			Jack Greenwood	United States	05.02.1926	San Diego	19.08.1978
15.1			Jack Greenwood	United States	05.02.1926	Gothenburg	12.08.1977
