= Masters M65 100 metres world record progression =

This is the progression of world record improvements of the 100 metres M65 division of Masters athletics.

Key

Incomplete information Wind aided Pending

Hand	Auto	Wind	Athlete	Nationality	Birthdate	Age	Location	Date	Ref
	12.03	(+0.6 m/s)	John Wright	Great Britain	15 June 1959	67 years, 69 days	Daegu	23 August 2026	
	12.15	(+0.9 m/s)	John Wright	Great Britain	15 June 1959	66 years, 90 days	Derby	13 September 2025	
	12.31	(+1.3 m/s)	Damien Leake	United States	21 August 1952	65 years, 299 days	Grass Valley	16 June 2018	
	12.33	(±0.0 m/s)	William Collins	United States	20 November 1950	66 years, 158 days	Philadelphia	27 April 2017	
	12.37	(+1.3 m/s)	Vladimir Vybostok	Slovakia	19 February 1947	65 years, 179 days	Zittau	16 August 2012	
	12.37	(+1.1 m/s)	Stephen Robbins	United States	31 January 1943	65 years, 184 days	Eugene	2 August 2008	
	12.53	(+1.9 m/s)	Paul Edens	United States	8 March 1941	65 years, 108 days	Eugene	24 June 2006	
	11.99	NWI	Paul Edens	United States	8 March 1941	65 years, 94 days	Gresham	10 June 2006	
	12.40	(+3.0 m/s)	Ken Dennis	United States	13 May 1937	66 years, 87 days	Eugene	8 August 2003	
	12.65	(+0.2 m/s)	Armando Roca Garcia	Spain	3 August 1934	65 years, 319 days	Talavera	17 June 2000	
	12.72	(+1.0 m/s)	Ito Tsuneo	Japan	1932		Oita	13 September 1997	
	12.53	NWI	Payton Jordan	United States	19 March 1917	66 years, 187 days	San Juan	22 September 1983	
13.3 h			Virgil McIntyre	United States					
