= Masters M55 100 metres world record progression =

This is the progression of world record improvements of the 100 metres M55 division of Masters athletics.

Key

Incomplete information Wind aided Pending

Hand	Auto	Wind	Athlete	Nationality	Birthdate	Age	Location	Date	Ref
	11.30	(±0.0 m/s)	Willie Gault	United States	5 September 1960	55 years, 245 days	Los Angeles	7 May 2016	
	11.26	(+2.3 m/s)	Bill Collins	United States	20 November 1950	55 years, 258 days	Charlotte	5 August 2006	
	11.39	0.0	Bill Collins	United States	20 November 1950	57 years, 144 days	Houston	12 April 2008	
	11.44		Bill Collins	United States	20 November 1950	57 years, 157 days	Philadelphia	25 April 2008	
	11.47	2.8	Eddie Hart	United States	24 April 1949	55 years, 13 days	Modesto	07 May 2004	
11.3			Ron Taylor	United Kingdom	04 December 1933	56 years, 272 days	Hull	02 September 1990	
	11.57	0.3	Ron Taylor	United Kingdom	04 December 1933	57 years, 242 days	Baden	03 August 1991	
	11.62		Charles Williams	United Kingdom	15 November 1930		Melbourne	31 November 1987	
11.5			Bernard Hogan	Australia	15 November 1920	56 years, 33 days	Melbourne	18 December 1976	
11.6			Charles Beaudry	United States	04 September 1918	55 years, 340 days		10 August 1974	
11.6			Payton Jordan	United States	19 March 1917	55 years, 13 days	Los Gatos	01 April 1972	
11.6			Alfred Guidet	United States	16 March 1918	56 years, 98 days	Gresham	22 June 1974	
	11.91		Alfred Guidet	United States	16 March 1918	56 years, 111 days	Gresham	05 July 1974	
