= Masters M65 200 metres world record progression =

This is the progression of world record improvements of the 200 metres M65 division of Masters athletics.

Key

Incomplete information Wind aided Pending

Hand	Auto	Wind	Athlete	Nationality	Birthdate	Age	Location	Date	Ref
	24.47	(+0.8 m/s)	John Wright	Great Britain	15 June 1959	66 years, 69 days	Sheffield	23 August 2025	
	24.65	(−0.7 m/s)	Charles Allie	United States	20 August 1947	65 years, 340 days	Berea	26 July 2013	
	24.73	NWI	Paul Edens	United States	8 March 1941	65 years, 94 days	Gresham	10 June 2006	
	25.45	(+1.8 m/s)	Guido Müller	Germany	22 December 1938	65 years, 222 days	Arhus	31 July 2004	
	25.69	NWI	Harold Tolson	United States	1 December 1937	65 years, 223 days	San Diego	12 July 2003	
	25.76	NWI	Paul Johnson	United States	9 September 1934	67 years, 6 days	Lubbock	15 September 2001	
	25.87	NWI	Jack Greenwood	United States	5 February 1926	65 years, 149 days	Naperville	4 July 1991	
25.6 h		NWI	Frederick O'Connor	Australia	27 December 1923	67 years, 93 days	Canberra	30 March 1991	
25.6 h		NWI	Bernard Hogan	Australia	15 November 1920	65 years, 21 days	Brisbane	6 December 1985	
	26.10	NWI	Payton Jordan	United States	19 March 1917	66 years, 190 days	San Juan	25 September 1983	
	26.20	NWI	Fritz Assmy	Germany	11 June 1915	68 years, 104 days	San Juan	23 September 1983	
	26.32	NWI	Fritz Assmy	Germany	11 June 1915	65 years, 214 days	Christchurch	11 January 1981	
	27.18	NWI	Fritz Assmy	Germany	11 June 1915	65	Helsinki	1980	
