= Masters M60 100 metres hurdles world record progression =

This is the progression of world record improvements of the 100 metres hurdles M60 division of Masters athletics.

Key

Incomplete information Wind aided Pending

Hand	Auto	Wind	Athlete	Nationality	Birthdate	Location	Date
	14.37	0.4	Thaddeus Wilson	United States	22.12.1950	Berea Video on YouTube	28.07.2011
	14.62	0.7	Courtland Gray	United States	07.01.1944	Decatur	06.08.2004
	14.74	-2.0	Charles Miller	United States	28.07.1937	Arlington	18.07.1998
	14.98	0.0	Jack Greenwood	United States	05.02.1926	Uniondale	19.07.1986
15.6			Tom Patsalis	United States	06.12.1921	San Juan	23.09.1983
19.5			Robert Reckwardt	Germany	01.04.1913	Gothenburg	12.08.1977
