= Masters M55 400 metres hurdles world record progression =

This is the progression of world record improvements of the 400 metres hurdles M55 division of Masters athletics.

Key

Incomplete information Pending

Hand	Auto	Athlete	Nationality	Birthdate	Location	Date
	57.73	Getulio Echeandia	Puerto Rico	15.05.1964	Ames	17.07.2019
	58.92	Guido Müller	Germany	22.12.1938	Buffalo	16.07.1995
	59.85	Jack Greenwood	United States	05.02.1926	San Juan	27.08.1983
	1:02.28	Andre Findelli	France	18.05.1923	Viareggio	10.09.1978
1:03.6		Alfred Guidet	United States	16.03.1918	Eagle Rock	24.06.1973
