= Nicole Lévêque =

Nicole Lévêque (born January 27, 1951, in Nuillé-sur-Vicoin, France) is a French long-distance runner and marathoner. She began her International career in her mid-40s, representing her native country in the 10,000 metres at the 1994 European Athletics Championships, coincidentally finishing fourteen seconds and one place ahead of Danish Olympian Gitte Karlshøj. Her time of 32:12.07 was a W40 world masters record. Just a month before the championships, she had set the world masters W40 record at 5,000 metres. A couple of weeks later she won the Auray-Vannes Half Marathon setting the masters world record at 1:11:35. Her record would stand for eight years until it was displaced by Karlshøj. She followed just two more weeks later representing France at the 1994 IAAF World Half Marathon Championships. She repeated in 1995 IAAF World Half Marathon Championships. In 1996, she set the still-standing W45 world record in the 5,000, the W45 1500 metres world record and came within 5 seconds of Evy Palm's W45 record in the 10,000, a record that is almost 2 minutes faster than any other athletes have achieved. She ran the Marathon at the 1998 European Athletics Championships, at age 47, setting her personal record at 2:36:52. Discounting the marathon as an all-inclusive final, she is also listed as the oldest finalist in a European Championship event requiring qualification from her appearance in the 10,000 metres in 1994. In 2001, at age 50, she again improved the W50 world record in the 5,000, which lasted just over 8 years until it was displaced again by Karlshøj.
