= Masters M45 110 metres hurdles world record progression =

This is the progression of world record improvements of the 110 metres hurdles M45 division of Masters athletics.

Key

Incomplete information Wind aided Pending

Hand	Auto	Wind	Athlete	Nationality	Birthdate	Age	Location	Date	Ref
	14.26	+0.3	Jan Schindzielorz	Germany	8 August 1978	45 years, 5 days	Mönchengladbach	13 August 2023	
	14.38	+0.4	Shauw Bownes	South Africa	24 October 1970	45 years, 161 days	Pretoria	2 April 2016	
	14.41	-1.3	Willie Gault	United States	5 September 1960	45 years, 250 days	Eagle Rock	13 May 2006	
	14.41	0.0	Karl Smith	Jamaica	15 September 1959	46 years, 324 days	Charlotte	5 August 2006	
	14.67	2.7	Peter Grimes	United States	10 February 1959	46 years, 136 days	Carson	26 June 2005	
	14.79	NWI	Thomas Gilliard	United States	1950	45	East Lansing	23 July 1995	
	14.84A	-1.2	Stan Druckrey	United States	10 August 1948	45 years, 1 day	Provo	11 August 1993	
	14.86	0.0	Valbjörn Þorláksson	Iceland	7 June 1934	45 years, 31 days	Hannover	8 July 1979	
15.4		NWI	Jack Greenwood	United States	5 February 1926	47 years, 61 days		7 April 1973	
