= Masters M80 1500 metres world record progression =

This is the progression of world record improvements of the 1500 metres M80 division of Masters athletics.

Key

Incomplete information Pending Better indoor records

Hand	Auto	Athlete	Nationality	Birthdate	Age	Location	Date	Ref
	5:30.89	Jose Vicente Rioseco Lopez	Spain	30 April 1941	80 years, 50 days	Málaga	19 June 2021	
	5:47.06	Jean Louis Esnault	France	19 January 1940	80 years, 265 days	Chalon-sur-Saône	10 October 2020	
	5:47.35	Manuel Alonso Sanchez	Spain	21 March 1936	80 years, 110 days	Castellón de la Plana	9 July 2016	
	5:48.93	Ed Whitlock	Canada	6 March 1931	80 years, 131 days	Sacramento	15 July 2011	
	5:48.47 i	Ed Whitlock	Canada	6 March 1931	80 years, 13 days	Kamloops	19 March 2011	
5:54.5 h		Harold Chapson	United States	11 July 1902	80 years, 6 days	Honolulu	17 July 1982	
