= Masters M80 100 metres world record progression =

This is the progression of world record improvements of the 100 metres M80 division of Masters athletics.

Key

Incomplete information Wind aided Pending

Hand	Auto	Wind	Athlete	Nationality	Birthdate	Age	Location	Date	Ref
	14.16	(+0.4 m/s)	Kenton Brown	United States	3 September 1944	81 years, 354 days	Daegu	23 August 2026	
	14.21	(−0.7 m/s)	Kenton Brown	United States	3 September 1944	80 years, 32 days	Las Vegas	5 October 2024	
	14.24	(+1.8 m/s)	Katsutoshi Nakamura	Japan	30 June 1942	80 years, 108 days	Saiki	16 October 2022	
	14.31	(+0.9 m/s)	Hartmut Krämer	Germany	19 March 1942	80 years, 103 days	Tampere	30 June 2022	
	14.42	(+1.9 m/s)	Payton Jordan	United States	19 March 1917	80 years, 143 days	San Jose	9 August 1997	
	14.35	NWI	Payton Jordan	United States	19 March 1917	80 years, 52 days	Modesto	10 May 1997	
	14.66	(−0.8 m/s)	Fritz Assmy	Germany	11 June 1915	80 years, 69 days	Minden	19 August 1995	
	15.33	(+0.6 m/s)	Yuichi Tateishi	Japan	1913	80	Miyazaki	15 October 1993	
15.4 h			Josiah Packard	United States	15 December 1903	80 years, 72 days	San Francisco	25 February 1984	
