= Masters M85 hammer throw world record progression =

Masters M85 hammer throw world record progression is the progression of world record improvements of the hammer throw M85 division of Masters athletics. Records must be set in properly conducted, official competitions under the standing IAAF rules unless modified by World Masters Athletics. The M85 division consists of male athletes who have reached the age of 85 but have not yet reached the age of 90, so exactly from their 85th birthday to the day before their 90th birthday. The M85 division throws a 3 kg implement.

Key

Incomplete information Pending

Distance	Athlete	Nationality	Birthdate	Age	Location	Date
43.17	Walter Krifka	Austria	16 December 1936	85 years, 156 days	Linz	18 June 2022
40.97	Walter Krifka	Austria	16 December 1936	85 years, 156 days	Leibnitz	21 May 2022
39.89	Jose Sanza	Spain	1 April 1935	87 years, 37 days	Palafrugell	8 May 2022
40.23	Walter Krifka	Austria	16 December 1936	85 years, 128 days	Linz	23 April 2022
38.93	Carmelo Rado	Italy	4 August 1933	85 years, 57 days	Modena	30 September 2018
32.52	Erik Eriksson	Finland	14 August 1923	85 years, 16 days	Jalasjärvi	30 August 2008
32.20	Robert Chase	United States	26 April 1921	85 years, 81 days	Chelmsford	16 July 2006
28.01	Anton Tesija	Australia	1913	86–87	Varaždin	15 July 2000
27.51	John Fraser	Australia	25 November 1914	85 years, 17 days	Melbourne	12 December 1999
27.30	Friederich Bender	West Germany	13 March 1900	85 years, 9 days	Rome	22 June 1985
