= Masters W50 shot put world record progression =

Masters W50 shot put world record progression is the progression of world record improvements of the shot put W50 division of Masters athletics. Records must be set in properly conducted, official competitions under the standing IAAF rules unless modified by World Masters Athletics. The W50 division consists of female athletes who have reached the age of 50 but have not yet reached the age of 55, so exactly from their 50th birthday to the day before their 55th birthday. The W50 division throws a 3 kg implement.

Key

Incomplete information Pending Indoor mark before 2000, not acceptable for record

Distance	Athlete	Nationality	Birthdate	Location	Date
15.17 i	Alexandra Marghieva	Moldova	27.06.1959	Gent	16.03.2011
15.15	Alexandra Marghieva	Moldova	27.06.1959	Lahti	28.07.2009
14.94	Helma Teuscher	Germany	31.12.1956	Ljubljana	26.07.2008
14.85	Valerie Young	New Zealand	10.08.1937	Melbourne	29.11.1987
14.82	Sigrun Kofink	Germany	23.04.1935	Dornbirn	28.09.1985
12.82	Odette Domingos	Brazil	05.09.1934	Rome	23.06.1985
12.77	Marianne Hamm	Germany	02.10.1927	Viareggio	14.09.1978
