= Masters M45 triple jump world record progression =

This is the progression of world record improvements of the triple jump M45 division of Masters athletics.

Key

Incomplete information Pending Indoor mark
IAAF includes indoor marks in the record list since 2000, but WMA does not follow that practice.

Distance	Wind	Athlete	Nationality	Birthdate	Location	Date
15.13	+0.2	Wolfgang Knabe	Germany	12.07.1959	Garbsen	22.05.2005
14.82 i		Milan Tiff	United States	05.07.1949	Reno	26.02.1995
14.18	1.8	Stig Bäcklund	Finland	27.10.1939	Porvoo	28.07.1987
14.01		Pericles Pinto	Portugal	15.02.1937	Strasbourg	14.07.1982
13.90		Hermann Strauss	Germany	06.03.1931	Gothenburg	11.08.1977
13.77		Dave Jackson	United States	26.08.1931	Gothenburg	10.08.1977
