= Masters W45 1500 metres world record progression =

This is the progression of world record improvements of the 1500 metres W45 division of Masters athletics.

Key

Incomplete information Pending

Hand	Auto	Athlete	Nationality	Birthdate	Location	Date
	4:05.44	Yekaterina Podkopayeva	Russia	11.06.1952	Moscow	03.08.1998
	4:29.98	Nicole Leveque	France	27.01.1951	Angers	05.05.1996
4:33.1		Antoinette Burleigh	France	15.04.1949		03.06.1994
	4:34.93	Jutta Pedersen	Sweden	06.12.1946	Gävle	17.07.1992
	4:36.58	Heather Matthews	New Zealand	1946	Auckland	02.02.1992
	4:40.48	Barbara Lehmann	Germany	02.04.1942	Munich	15.06.1991
4:40.4		Judy Pollock	Australia	25.06.1940	Toronto	01.07.1985
	4:43.84	Godelieve Roggeman	Belgium	30.04.1940	Rome	29.06.1985
4:49.2		Anne McKenzie	South Africa	28.07.1925	Stellenbosch	16.11.1974
