= Masters M75 long jump world record progression =

This is the progression of world record improvements of the long jump M75 division of Masters athletics.

Key

Incomplete information Pending

Distance	Wind	Athlete	Nationality	Birthdate	Location	Date
4.83	0.8	Ishigami Saburo	Japan	15.08.1930	Osaka	26.08.2005
4.78		Mazumi Morita	Japan	17.07.1913	Akita	30.07.1988
4.47		Heikki Simola	Finland	16.01.1912	Salo	04.07.1987
4.30		Josef Sahlmann	Germany	04.10.1907	Schriesheim	02.07.1983
4.28		Gulab Singh	India	13.10.1905	San Juan	23.09.1983
4.25		Curgill Sutherland	United Kingdom	07.07.1900	London	17.07.1976
