= Masters M75 200 metres world record progression =

This is the progression of world record improvements of the 200 metres M75 division of Masters athletics.

Key

Incomplete information Wind aided Pending better indoor records

Hand	Auto	Wind	Athlete	Nationality	Birthdate	Age	Location	Date	Ref
	27.60	(+1.6 m/s)	Michael Kish	United States	1952	75	Geneva	19 July 2026	
	27.73	(−0.1 m/s)	Robert Lida	United States	11 November 1936	75 years, 268 days	Lisle	5 August 2012	
	27.70	(−0.1 m/s)	Robert Lida	United States	11 November 1936	75 years, 246 days	Topeka	14 July 2012	
	27.64 i		Robert Lida	United States	11 November 1936	75 years, 146 days	Jyväskylä	5 April 2012	
	27.03 i		Robert Lida	United States	11 November 1936	75 years, 62 days	Wichita	12 January 2012	
	27.97	(+1.5 m/s)	Wolfgang Reuter	Germany	12 August 1929	75 years, 339 days	Vaterstetten	17 July 2005	
	28.14	NWI	Payton Jordan	United States	19 March 1917	75 years, 93 days	Eagle Rock	20 June 1992	
	28.60	(+1.2 m/s)	Fritz Assmy	Germany	11 June 1915	75 years, 24 days	Budapest	5 July 1990	
29.5 h		NWI	Josiah Packard	United States	15 December 1903		Santa Ana	24 June 1979	
31.7 h		NWI	Herb Anderson	United States			Gothenburg	10 August 1977	
