= Noel Clough =

Australian athletics competitor (1937–2023)

Medal record

Men's athletics

Representing Australia

British Empire and Commonwealth Games
Gold medal – first place	1966 Kingston	880-yd run

Noel Stanley Clough (25 April 1937 – 20 May 2023) was an Australian track and field athlete who competed in the 400 metres, 800 metres, and 400 metres hurdles.

Hailing from Victoria, Australia, he enjoyed success at national level in the mid-1960s, taking runner-up spots three times in the 800 m at the Australian Athletics Championships. He also had top three finishes in the 400 m and the 400 m hurdles.

Clough competed at one major international competition in his career, running in the 880-yard run, and individual and relay 440-yard events. He was a finalist in the 440 yd, taking eighth place, and helped the Australian 4 × 440 yard relay team to fifth. His career peak came in the 880 yd final, in which he broke the games record to take the gold medal in a time of 1:46.9 minutes, beating Kenya's Wilson Kiprugut (an Olympic medallist) and the home favourite George Kerr who was a former Commonwealth champion. The time was a full second faster than Clough had ever managed before. This was the last time that the event was staged, thus Clough's winning time remains the games record for the now-defunct distance. His run ranked him joint fifth on the global rankings that year, alongside compatriot Ralph Doubell.

Clough continued to compete in his later years as a masters athlete. He won a 400 m/400 m hurdles double in the men's over-40 category at the 1977 World Masters Athletics Championships. His winning times of 49.5 seconds and 54.3 seconds were world records for the over-40s 400 m and 400 m hurdles respectively.

Noel Clough died on 20 May 2023, at the age of 86.

== International competitions ==
Year	Competition	Venue	Position	Event	Notes
1966	British Empire and Commonwealth Games	Kingston, Jamaica	8th	440 yd	47.53
1966	British Empire and Commonwealth Games	Kingston, Jamaica	1st	880 yd	1:46.9 GR
1966	British Empire and Commonwealth Games	Kingston, Jamaica	5th	4 × 440 yd relay	3:12.2

== See also ==
- List of middle-distance runners
