= Masters W70 400 metres world record progression =

This is the progression of world record improvements of the 400 metres W70 division of Masters athletics.

Key

Incomplete information Pending

Hand	Auto	Athlete	Nationality	Birthdate	Age	Location	Date	Ref
	1:10.62	Sara Montecinos	Chile	8 March 1954	70 years, 168 days	Gothenburg	23 August 2024	
	1:11.78	Barbara Blurton	Australia	19 March 1950	70 years, 266 days	Cannington	10 December 2020	
	1:12.51	Barbara Blurton	Australia	19 March 1950	70 years, 238 days	Cannington	12 November 2020	
	1:12.76	Barbara Blurton	Australia	19 March 1950	70 years, 203 days	Cannington	8 October 2020	
	1:13.97	Aletta Ungerer	South Africa	15 November 1945	70 years, 356 days	Perth	5 November 2016	
	1:15.81	Riet Jonkers-Slegers	Netherlands	4 October 1943	70 years, 22 days	Porto Alegre	26 October 2013	
	1:16.63	Anne Stobaus	Australia	6 July 1941	70 years, 0 days	Sacramento	6 July 2011	
	1:16.81	Leontine Vitola	Latvia	24 December 1937	70 years, 213 days	Ljubljana	24 July 2008	
1:17.5		Winifred Audrey Reid	South Africa	1915	70	Germiston	15 June 1985	
	1:24.23	Polly Clarke	United States	17 July 1910	73 years, 68 days	San Juan	23 September 1983	
