= Maria Pia D'Orlando =

Italian long-distance runner

Personal information
- Nationality: Italian
- Born: November 2, 1934 (age 91)

Sport
- Country: Italy
- Sport: Athletics
- Event: Marathon

Achievements and titles
- Personal best: Marathon: 2:46:13 (1982)

Maria Pia D'Orlando (born 2 November 1934) is an Italian former long-distance runner who competed in the marathon. She was the first female Italian national champion in the marathon. Her personal best of 2:46:13 hours for that event was previously masters world record in the over-45 age category.

== Biography ==
She had an exceptional run of success about the age of 45. Just days before her 45th birthday, 21 October 1979, she won the masters division of the New York Marathon in 2:54:58 on what was later judged to be a short course. In January 1980, she won the Monza Marathon for the second time in 2:54:31. She had also won in 1978 in a comparable 2:54:16. She took on a full schedule at the European Veterans Championships in Helsinki, winning the 1500 metres, the 5000 metres and the Marathon in 3:02:00. On 12 October 1980 she won the Italian National Championship (open division) in Rieti the first time the championship was offered for women in 2:49:22.4.

In early 1981, she went to Christchurch, New Zealand, where she dominated the WAVA Championships taking home gold in the W45 1500 metres, 5000 metres and the cross country event. The 18:09.03 in the 5000 m was a W45 world record. It lasted as the Italian masters record until 2009. On 13 September 1981 she improved her marathon time to 2:48:46 in Agen, France. Then on 9 May 1982 she improved her time again to 2:46:13 for the W45 world record in Verona.

== See also ==
- Masters W45 marathon world record progression
