= Masters M60 400 metres world record progression =

This is the progression of world record improvements of the 400 metres M60 division of Masters athletics.

Key

Incomplete information Pending

Hand	Auto	Athlete	Nationality	Birthdate	Location	Date
	53.88	Ralph Romain	Trinidad and Tobago	20.07.1932	Buffalo	22.07.1995
	55.24	Peter Mirkes	Germany	25.09.1927		28.08.1988
55.8		Berthold Neumann	Germany	19.12.1930	Weyhe	12.08.1992
	57.65	Jack Greenwood	United States	05.02.1926	Uniondale	18.07.1986
	58.11	Frank Evans	New Zealand	07.04.1925	Rome	29.06.1985
	58.4	John Alexander	United States	06.09.1919	McCamey	27.06.1981
