= Masters M60 100 metres world record progression =

Athletic record improvements

This is the progression of world record improvements of the 100 metres M60 division of Masters athletics.

Key

Incomplete information Wind aided Pending

Hand	Auto	Wind	Athlete	Nationality	Birthdate	Age	Location	Date	Ref
	11.66	(+0.1 m/s)	Mario Longo	Italy	21 August 1964	60 years, 318 days	Nocera Inferiore	5 July 2025	
	11.70	(+0.5 m/s)	Ron Taylor	Great Britain	4 December 1933	60 years, 185 days	Athens	4 June 1994	
	12.00	w	Peter Mirkes	Germany	25 September 1927	60 years, 65 days	Melbourne	29 November 1987	
11.8			Payton Jordan	United States	19 March 1917	61 years, 69 days	Los Gatos	27 May 1978	
12.0			Payton Jordan	United States	19 March 1917				
	12.40		Percy Duncan	Canada			Gothenburg	08 August 1977	
