= Masters M70 10000 metres world record progression =

World record progression of 10000 metres

This is the progression of world record improvements of the 10000 metres M70 division of Masters athletics.

Key

Incomplete information Pending

Hand	Auto	Athlete	Nationality	Birthdate	Location	Date						
	36:55.60	Eddy Vierendeels	Belgium	07.11.1952	Leuven	08.05.2024						
	38:04.13	Ed Whitlock	Canada	06.03.1931	Brisbane	09.07.2001						
	38:23.69	Warren Utes	United States	25.06.1920	Turku	20.07.1991						
38:27.0		John Gilmour	Australia	03.05.1919	Eugene	21.06.1989						
40:40.0		Alan Burgoyne	Australia	12.06.1914	Melbourne	17.12.1985 (	40:48.5	Einar Nordin	Sweden	03.07.1906	Gothenburg	08.08.1977
