= Masters W45 80 metres hurdles world record progression =

This is the progression of world record improvements of the 80 metres hurdles W45 division of Masters athletics.

Key

Incomplete information Wind aided Pending

Hand	Auto	Wind	Athlete	Nationality	Birthdate	Age	Location	Date	Ref
	11.47	(−1.1 m/s)	Olutoyin Augustus	Nigeria	24 December 1979	45 years, 179 days	Houston	21 June 2025	
	11.51	(+0.3 m/s)	Christine Müller	Switzerland	22 July 1958	46 years, 0 days	Arhus	22 July 2004	
	12.17	NWI	Danielle Desmier	France	27 July 1949	46 years, 310 days	Anzin	1 June 1996	
	12.22	NWI	Phil Raschker	United States	21 February 1947	47 years, 165 days	Edmonton	5 August 1994	
	12.28	NWI	Corrie Roovers	Netherlands	14 July 1935	46 years, 363 days	Strasbourg	12 July 1982	
	12.34	(−1.1 m/s)	Riny Hagenaars	Netherlands	17 July 1951	45 years, 325 days	Emmen	7 June 1997	
	12.48	(±0.0 m/s)	Geradline Otto	Germany	6 November 1949	46 years, 244 days	Hagen	7 July 1996	
	12.87	NWI	Colleen Mills	New Zealand	23 November 1933	44	Hannover	1979	
