= Masters W45 5000 metres world record progression =

This is the progression of world record improvements of the 5000 metres W45 division of Masters athletics.

Key

Incomplete information Pending

Hand	Auto	Athlete	Nationality	Birthdate	Location	Date
	15:55.71	Nicole Leveque	France	27.01.1951	Angers	01.06.1996
16:17.5		Evy Palm	Sweden	31.01.1942	Oslo	04.07.1987
	17:33.3	Dot Browne	Australia	06.02.1941	Adelaide	30.03.1986
	17:41.24	Anne Marie Grüner	Germany	26.05.1940	Rome	27.06.1985
	18:09.03	Maria Pia d'Orlando	Italy	02.11.1934	Christchurch	11.01.1981
18:16.6		Maria Pia d'Orlando	Italy	02.11.1934	Helsinki	08.08.1980
