= Masters M45 800 metres world record progression =

This is the progression of world record improvements of the 800 metres M45 division of Masters athletics.

Key

Incomplete information Pending

Hand	Auto	Athlete	Nationality	Birthdate	Age	Location	Date	Ref
	1:54.18	Saladin Allah	United States	1 January 1960	45 years, 182 days	Pomona	2 July 2005	
	1:55.13	Anselm LeBourne	United States	20 April 1959	46 years, 67 days	Randalls Island	26 June 2005	
	1:56.16	Ronald Mercelina	Netherlands	18.04.1946	Lisse	07.07.1991		
	1:56.27	Donald Parker	United States	1943	Los Angeles	12.05.1990		
	1:57.4	Klaus Mainka	Germany	12.03.1936	Neckargemuend	08.08.1981		
	1:57.9	Johan Hesselberg	Norway	03.06.1932	Gothenburg	09.08.1977		
	1:58.1	Bill Fitzgerald	United States	20.05.1925	San Diego	06.07.1973		
