= Masters M75 discus world record progression =

Masters M75 discus world record progression is the progression of world record improvements of the discus M75 division of Masters athletics. Records must be set in properly conducted, official competitions under the standing IAAF rules unless modified by World Masters Athletics. The M75 division consists of male athletes who have reached the age of 75 but have not yet reached the age of 80, so exactly from their 75th birthday to the day before their 80th birthday. The M75 division throws a 1 kg implement.

Key

Incomplete information Pending

Distance	Athlete	Nationality	Birthdate	Location	Date
49.21	Carmelo Rado	Italy	04.08.1933	Besana Brianza	05.10.2008
45.68	Kauko Jouppila	Finland	03.03.1921	Espoo	21.09.1996
43.90	Rolf Gustavsson	Sweden	07.01.1917	Norrtälje	08.08.1992
41.60	Osmo Renvall	Finland	10.11.1910	Malmö	19.07.1986
38.76	Karsten Brodersen	Germany	24.06.1907	San Juan	25.09.1983
38.44	Werner Andersson	Sweden	07.01.1906	Västerås	04.07.1981
