= Masters M75 pole vault world record progression =

This is the progression of world record improvements of the pole vault M75 division of Masters athletics.

Key

Incomplete information Pending

Height	Athlete	Nationality	Birthdate	Location	Date
3.23	Don Islett	United States		Belton	07.06.2014
3.20	Don Islett	United States		Dallas	31.05.2014
3.05	William Bell	United States	19.03.1922	Los Angeles	11.04.1998
3.05	Franklin "Bud" Held	United States	25.10.1927	Mission Viejo	08.03.2003
3.00	Franklin "Bud" Held	United States	25.10.1927	San Diego	28.05.2006
2.90	Carol Johnston	United States	24.12.1911	Los Angeles	02.07.1987
2.50	Ahti Pajunen	Finland	03.12.1909	Rome	25.06.1985
