= Masters W70 10000 metres world record progression =

This is the progression of world record improvements of the 10000 metres W70 division of Masters athletics.

Key

Incomplete information Pending

Hand	Auto	Athlete	Nationality	Birthdate	Location	Date
	44:43.27	Lavinia Petrie	Australia	13.09.1943	Hobart	07.04.2014
	45:28.73	Lavinia Petrie	Australia	13.09.1943	Ballarat	24.01.2014
	46:38.50	Marie-Louise Michelsohn	United States	08.10.1941	San Mateo	26.05.2012
	47:09.94	Riitta Rasimus	Finland	10.02.1941	Mikkeli	31.07.2011
	47:22.51	Melitta Czerwenka Nagel	Germany	30.04.1930	St. Wendel	23.09.2000
	48:10.98	Jose Edith Waller	United Kingdom	16.04.1922	Jarrow	18.07.1993
	50:28.33	Pat Dixon	United States	15.02.1919	Eugene	29.07.1989
51:03.0		Johanna Luther	Germany	02.08.1913	San Juan	25.09.1983
