= Masters W75 high jump world record progression =

World record improvements of the high jump W75 division

This is the progression of world record improvements of the high jump W75 division of Masters athletics.

Key

Incomplete information Pending

Height	Athlete	Nationality	Birthdate	Location	Date
1.22	Kathy Bergen	United States	24.12.1939	Pasadena	6.06.2015
1.21	Kathy Bergen	United States	24.12.1939	Costa Mesa	23.05.2015
1.20	Rietje Dijkman	Netherlands	21.06.1939	Heiloo	22.06.2014
1.18	Rosemary Chrimes	United Kingdom	19.05.1933	Nuneaton	10.06.2012
1.16	Christa Happ	Germany	25.12.1929	Vaterstetten	16.07.2005
1.15	Leonore McDaniels	United States	06.03.1928	Sacramento	03.08.2003
1.12	Gwen Davidson	Australia	28.11.1922	Adelaide	01.09.1999
1.11	Helgi Pedel	Canada	21.01.1924	Toronto	12.06.1999
1.10 i	Margaret Hinton	United States	14.08.1919	Boston	26.03.1999
1.08	Bertha Hielscher	Germany	17.11.1908	Rome	24.06.1985
