= Masters M40 100 metres world record progression =

This is the progression of world record improvements of the 100 metres M40 division of Masters athletics.

Key

Incomplete information Wind aided Pending

Hand	Auto	Wind	Athlete	Nationality	Birthdate	Age	Location	Date	Ref
	9.93	(+1.9 m/s)	Kim Collins	Saint Kitts and Nevis	5 April 1976	40 years, 54 days	Bottrop	29 May 2016	
	10.26	(+2.3 m/s)	Troy Douglas	Netherlands	30 November 1962	41 years, 223 days	Utrecht	10 July 2004	
	10.29	1.9	Troy Douglas	Netherlands	30 November 1962	40 years, 189 days	Leiden	07 June 2003	
	10.60		Bill Collins	United States	20 November 1950	41 years, 199 days		06 June 1992	
	10.84	1.8	Erik Oostweegel	Netherlands	29 April 1960	40 years, 42 days	Tilburg	10 June 2000	
	10.87		Eddie Hart	United States	24 April 1949	40 years, 101 days	Eugene	03 August 1989	
	10.90		Thaddeus Bell	United States	28 November 1942	45 years, 155 days	Raleigh, North Carolina	01 May 1988	
	10.93	0.6	Gilles Echevin	France	01 September 1948	40 years, 248 days	Grenoble	07 May 1989	
10.7			Klaus Jürgen Schneider	Germany	02 March 1942	40 years, 127 days	Stuttgart	07 July 1982	
10.7			Walt Butler	United States	21 March 1941	40 years, 56 days	Northridge	16 May 1981	
10.7			Thane Baker	United States	04 October 1931	50 years, 344 days	Elkhart	13 September 1972	
	10.95		George McNeill	United Kingdom	19 February 1947		Melbourne	31 November 1987	
	10.95		Karl Heinz Schröder	Germany	17 June 1939	40 years, 41 days	Hannover	28 July 1979	
