= Masters M75 1500 metres world record progression =

This is the progression of world record improvements of the 1500 metres M75 division of Masters athletics.

Key

Incomplete information Pending better indoor records

Hand	Auto	Athlete	Nationality	Birthdate	Age	Location	Date	Ref
	5:11.05	Cees Stolwijk	Netherlands	10 January 1950	75 years, 74 days	Amersfoort	25 March 2025	
	5:11.27	Jose Vicente Rioseco Lopez	Spain	30 April 1941	77 years, 47 days	Pontevedra	16 June 2018	
	5:20.04 i	Ed Whitlock	Canada	6 March 1931	75 years, 348 days	Toronto	17 February 2007	
	5:22.35	Jean Louis Esnault	France	19 January 1940	76 years, 168 days	Saint-Maur-des-Fossés	5 July 2016	
	5:22.40	Shichiro Midorikawa	Japan	1932	75	Fukushima	16 June 2007	
5:22.7		Yoshimitsu Miyauchi	Japan	20 July 1924	75 years, 96 days	Kagoshima	24 October 1999	
5:28.5		Scotty Carter	United States	14 November 1916	75 years, 227 days	Providence	28 June 1992	
5:30.1		Harold Chapson	United States	11 July 1902	75 years, 30 days	Gothenburg	10 August 1977	
