= Masters M65 5000 metres world record progression =

This is the progression of world record improvements of the 5000 metres M65 division of Masters athletics.

Key

Incomplete information Pending

| Hand | Auto | Athlete | Nationality | Birthdate | Age | Location | Date |
|---|---|---|---|---|---|---|---|
| | 16:36.59 | Alastair Walker | United Kingdom | 25 May 1956 | 66 years, 80 days | Tullamore | 13 August 2022 |
| 16:38.8 | | Derek Turnbull | New Zealand | 5 December 1926 | 65 years, 99 days | Christchurch | 13 March 1992 |
| 17:13.8 | | Rune Bergman | Sweden | 8 October 1924 | 65 years, 321 days | Högby | 25 August 1990 |
| 17:25.3 | | John Gilmour | Australia | 3 May 1919 | 66 years, 55 days | Rome | 27 June 1985 |
| 17:40.4 | | Clive Davies | United States | 17 August 1915 | 66 years, 348 days | | 31 July 1982 |
| | 18:04.06 | Erich Kruzycki | Germany | 18 February 1911 | 65 years, 73 days | Göttingen | 1 May 1976 |
