= Masters W45 400 metres world record progression =

It relates with masters athletics

This is the progression of world record improvements of the 400 metres W45 division of Masters athletics.

Key

Incomplete information Pending

Hand	Auto	Athlete	Nationality	Birthdate	Location	Date
	56.14	Angee Henry-Nott	United States	21 December 1975	Ames: Video on YouTube	23 July 2021
	56.15	Marie Lande Mathieu	Puerto Rico	26 November 1956	Carolina	12 July 2003
	56.82	Mary Libal	United States	28 June 1950	Buffalo	22 July 1995
57.8		Jan Hynes	Australia	3 April 1944	Brisbane	1 March 1989
	59.68	Colleen Mills	New Zealand	23 November 1933	Christchurch	10 January 1981
