= Masters M75 100 metres world record progression =

This is the progression of world record improvements of the 100 metres M75 division of Masters athletics.

Key

Incomplete information Wind aided Pending

Hand	Auto	Wind	Athlete	Nationality	Birthdate	Age	Location	Date	Ref
	13.25	(+0.8 m/s)	Kenton Brown	United States	3 September 1944	76 years, 30 days	Marble Falls	3 October 2020	
	13.49	(+0.4 m/s)	Robert Lida	United States	11 November 1936	75 years, 275 days	Lisle	2 August 2012	
	13.54	+1.0	Bruno Kimmel	Germany	3 March 1934	75 years, 129 days	Vaterstetten	10 July 2009	
	13.61	0.0	Wolfgang Reuter	Germany	12 August 1929	75 years, 338 days	Vaterstetten	16 July 2005	
	13.64	-0.8	Fritz Assmy	Germany	11 June 1915	76 years, 66 days	Trier	16 August 1991	
13.4			Percy Duncan	Canada			Toronto	30 June 1990	
13.8			Reinhard Nordhausen	Germany	12 August 1911	75 years, 256 days	Berlin	25 April 1987	
	14.06		Frederick Reid	South Africa	29 June 1909	76 years, 306 days		1 May 1986	
	14.3		Josiah Packard	United States	15 December 1903	75 years, 191 days	San Francisco	24 June 1979	
14.8			Herbert Anderson	United States					
