= Masters W35 1500 metres world record progression =

This is the progression of world record improvements of the 1500 metres W35 division of Masters athletics.

Key

Incomplete information Pending

Hand	Auto	Athlete	Nationality	Birthdate	Location	Date
	3:57.73	Maricia Puica	Romania	29.07.1950	Brussels	30.08.1985
	3:58.57	Ileana Silai	Romania	14.10.1941	Bucharest	16.06.1979
4:12.0		Joyce Smith	United Kingdom	26.10.1937	Rome	06.09.1974
