= Masters M65 long jump world record progression =

This is the progression of world record improvements of the long jump M65 division of Masters athletics.

Key

Incomplete information Pending Indoor mark
IAAF includes indoor marks in the record list since 2000, but WMA does not follow that practice.

Distance	Wind	Athlete	Nationality	Birthdate	Age	Location	Date	Ref
5.54 m	(+0.4 m/s)	Stanislaw Chmielewski	Poland	2 July 1959	66 years, 3 days	Gorzów	5 July 2025	
5.47 m	(+0.1 m/s)	Adrian Neagu	Romania	15 June 1953	65 years, 103 days	Bucharest	26 August 2018	
5.48 m i		Klemens Grissmer	Germany	12 November 1951	65 years, 132 days	Daegu	24 March 2017	
5.47 m	(+0.3 m/s)	Lamberto Boranga	Italy	31 October 1942	65 years, 267 days	Ljubljana	24 July 2008	
5.47 m	(−0.4 m/s)	Lothar Fischer	Germany	15 March 1936	65 years, 170 days	Ludwigshafen	1 September 2001	
5.43 m	(±0.0 m/s)	Hans Bittner	Germany	22 February 1920	66 years, 157 days	Malmö	29 July 1986	
5.38 m	NWI	Richmond "Boo" Morcom	United States	1 May 1921	65 years, 73 days	Shippensburg	13 July 1986	
5.16 m	NWI	Willi Rumig	Germany	29 January 1914	65 years, 183 days	Hannover	31 July 1979	
4.67 m	NWI	Russell Hargraves	United States					
