= Masters W45 200 metres world record progression =

This is the progression of world record improvements of the 200 metres W45 division of Masters athletics.

Key

Incomplete information Wind aided Pending

Hand	Auto	Wind	Athlete	Nationality	Birthdate	Location	Date
	23.82	0.2	Merlene Ottey	Slovenia	10.05.1960	Banská Bystrica	27.08.2006
	25.56		Phil Raschker	United States	21.02.1947	New York	20.06.1994
	25.63		Jan Hynes	Australia	03.04.1944	Brisbane	01.02.1991
	26.21		Irene Obera	United States	07.12.1933	Christchurch	13.01.1981
