= Masters M40 200 metres world record progression =

This is the progression of world record improvements of the 200 metres M40 division of Masters athletics.

Key

Incomplete information Wind aided Pending

Hand	Auto	Wind	Athlete	Nationality	Birthdate	Age	Location	Date	Ref
	20.64	(+0.7 m/s)	Troy Douglas	Netherlands	30 November 1962	40 years, 270 days	Paris	27 August 2003	
	20.64	(+1.3 m/s)	Troy Douglas	Netherlands	30 November 1962	40 years, 252 days	Utrecht	9 August 2003	
	21.38	NWI	Bill Collins	United States	20 November 1950	40 years, 226 days	Naperville	4 July 1991	
	21.74	w	Eddie Hart	United States	24.04.1949	Eugene	01.08.1989		
	21.98	NWI	Stan Whitley	United States	17.12.1945	Springfield	14.08.1987		
21.8 h		NWI	Manuel Ulacio	Venezuela	1940	Caracas	04.09.1982		
21.9 h		NWI	Reginald Austin	Australia	16.10.1936	Gothenburg	10.08.1977		
22.2 h		NWI	Ron Taylor	United Kingdom	04.12.1933	Leicester	20.06.1975		
22.2 h		NWI	Thane Baker	United States	04.10.1931		13.07.1974		
