= Masters M40 400 metres hurdles world record progression =

World record progression

This is the progression of world record improvements of the 400 metres hurdles M40 division of Masters athletics.

Key

Incomplete information Pending

Hand	Auto	Athlete	Nationality	Birthdate	Location	Date
	49.69	Danny McFarlane	Jamaica	1972-02-14	Kingston	2012-06-29
	52.62	Antônio Dias Ferreira	Brazil	1960-03-02	Rio de Janeiro	2000-07-23
	52.76	James King	United States	1949-05-09	Eugene	1989-08-03
52.7		Stan Druckrey	United States	1948-08-10	Libertyville	1989-07-08
	54.08	Leon Hacker	South Africa	1939-05-26	Hannover	1979-07-29
54.1		George Mathe	South Africa	1937		1979-06-30
54.3		Noel Clough	Australia	1937-04-25	Gothenburg	1977-08-11
54.8		Jim Dixon	United Kingdom	1932-03-15	Warley	1973-05-27
55.6		Luigi Facelli	Italy	1898-05-10	Bologna	1938-07-24
