= Harold Chapson =

American masters athlete (1902–1992)

Harold B. Chapson (July 11, 1902 - November 19, 1992) was an American masters athlete. As the division was in its infancy, Chanson explored the abilities of a 70 plus year old, setting numerous Masters athletics world records in events from 400 metres to 1500 metres. He still holds many American records. In 1998 he was elected into the USATF Masters Hall of Fame.

He was originally from Pagosa Springs, Colorado, where his parents Elmer and Alma Chapson were regarded as pioneers. His mother lived to age 103, dying in Sebastopol, California in 1983 where she was an avid walker into her second century. Chapson was involved in track and field for more than 60 years dating back to the 1920s. He was a track star at Colorado A&M in 1925 and 1926. His autobiography shares the harsh living conditions from his days as a child. He had polio at age 5 which limited his left arm. He adjusted his running style to adapt to the handicap.

He moved to Hawaii in 1929, teaching shop and agriculture teacher at a junior high school. After he retired in 1964, he began walking trails for exercise.

"It was 1968 that I took up running again. I live right across the street from Ala Moana Park and it just occurred to me one day that I should get out there and run. The running boom hadn't got off the ground then, and I'd sometimes be the only one running in the park. I liked the way I felt after I ran and so I started doing it regularly, maybe two or three miles a day."

He served as president of the Mid-Pacific Road Running Club starting in 1976 and also worked as a track official. The club hosts the Harold Chapson Memorial 8K starting and finishing in Kapiolani Park every January. He was part of the Faces in the Crowd section of Sports Illustrated, August 20, 1973 issue.

On his 80th birthday, he set the M80 world record in the 800 meters and 1500 meters. He further improved the 800 record, the 1500 record lasted for just over 29 years.
