= Masters M60 800 metres world record progression =

This is the progression of world record improvements of the 800 metres M60 division of Masters athletics.

Key

Incomplete information Pending

Hand	Auto	Athlete	Nationality	Birthdate	Age	Location	Date	Ref
	2:06.67	Andrew Ridley	Great Britain	24 July 1964	61 years, 300 days	Winchester	20 May 2026	
	2:07.65	Robert McHarg	Great Britain	12 January 1964	61 years, 279 days	Madeira	18 October 2025	
	2:08.56	Nolan Shaheed	United States	18 July 1949	61 years, 279 days	Los Angeles	23 April 2011	
	2:10.42	Alan Bradford	Australia	31 January 1939	60 years, 184 days	Gateshead	3 August 1999	
	2:12.62	Derek Turnbull	New Zealand	5 December 1926	62 years, 228 days	San Diego	21 July 1989	
	2:12.85	Earl Fee	Canada	22 March 1929	60 years, 106 days	Toronto	6 July 1989	
	2:14.02	Frank Evans	New Zealand	7 April 1925	60 years, 78 days	Rome	24 June 1985	
2:15.2 h		Harry Tempan	Great Britain	20 May 1925	60 years, 18 days	London	7 June 1985	
	2:16.98	John Gilmour	Australia	3 May 1919	61 years, 253 days	Christchurch	11 January 1981	
