= Masters M40 400 metres world record progression =

This is the progression of world record improvements of the 400 metres M40 division of Masters athletics.

Key

Incomplete information Pending

| Hand | Auto | Athlete | Nationality | Birthdate | Age | Location | Date | Ref |
|---|---|---|---|---|---|---|---|---|
| | 47.82 | Enrico Saraceni | Italy | 19 May 1964 | 62 years, 185 days | Arhus | 28 July 2004 | |
| | 47.86 | Eric Roeske | Netherlands | 26.09.1960 | Potsdam | 21.08.2002 | | |
| | 47.87 | Manuel Ulacio | Venezuela | 1940 | Santiago | 11.04.1981 | | |
| | 49.57 | Bruno Bianchi | Italy | 08.01.1939 | Hannover | 01.07.1979 | | |
| 49.5 | | Noel Clough | Australia | 25.04.1937 | Gothenburg | 08.08.1977 | | |
| 49.7 | | John Dixon | United Kingdom | 15.03.1932 | Crystal Palace, London | 22.06.1973 | | |
