= Masters M70 80 metres hurdles world record progression =

This is the progression of world record improvements of the 80 metres hurdles M70 division of Masters athletics.

Key

Incomplete information Wind aided Pending

Hand	Auto	Wind	Athlete	Nationality	Birthdate	Age	Location	Date	Ref
	12.58	(−1.0 m/s)	Ward Hazen	Canada	28 July 1954	71 years, 13 days	Charlottesville	10 August 2025	
	12.61	(−0.9 m/s)	Tyrone Brown	United States	9 February 1945	70 years, 165 days	Jacksonville	24 July 2015	
	12.18	NWI	James Stookey	United States	20 January 1930	70 years, 156 days	Randolph	24 June 2000	
	12.96	(+1.1 m/s)	Arno Hamaekers	Germany	1 May 1940	70 years, 47 days	Limburgerhof	17 June 2010	
	12.99	(−1.1 m/s)	James Stookey	United States	20 January 1930	70 years, 114 days	Raleigh	13 May 2000	
	13.52	NWI	Teófilo Colón	Puerto Rico	20 September 1914	70 years, 276 days	Rome	23 June 1985	
	13.54	NWI	Melvin Larsen	United States	12 June 1924	74 years, 65 days	Oak Forest	16 August 1998	
	13.68	(+0.2 m/s)	Melvin Larsen	United States	12 June 1924	75 years, 78 days	Orlando	29 August 1999	
	13.97	(+1.7 m/s)	Albertus Van Zyl	South Africa	13 August 1922	71 years, 58 days	Miyazaki	10 October 1993	
	14.09	NWI	Robert Reckwardt	Germany	1 April 1913	70 years, 179 days	San Juan	27 September 1983	
