= Damien Leake =

American actor and masters athlete

Damien Leake (born August 12, 1952, in The Bronx, New York City) is an American actor and world record-holding masters track and field athlete.

== Early life ==
On August 28, 1963, just days after his eleventh birthday, Leake joined his parents attending the March on Washington for Jobs and Freedom, where Martin Luther King Jr. delivered his "I Have a Dream" speech. When King was assassinated less than five years later, Leake began what has become a form of silent protest by remaining seated during the U.S. national anthem. The protest almost caused him to be tried in court-martial when he was in the Army, stationed at Fort Dix. In 2016, a similar protest by Colin Kaepernick caught mass media attention and the ire of then President Trump.

“Does it ever occur to you that the playing of the national anthem has no place at a sporting event, period? Those of you who know me from high school may remember that I decided to start sitting during the playing of the Star Spangled Banner on April 4th 1968, and have been sitting ever since.”

== Entertainment career ==
Starting with a role in 1973's Serpico, Leake has had a continuous career appearing in some 70 motion pictures, plus numerous television and stage acting roles. Through the 1980s he was typecast as a "a tender, sensitive . . . half-crazed killer" including roles in Death Wish and Apocalypse Now.

Leake has branched out to other jobs related to the entertainment industry. He claims to having been a singer, dancer, director, musician, composer, musical director, vocal arranger, playwright, stage fight choreographer and ventriloquist.

== Athletics career ==
Leake is a leading sprinter in masters athletics. On June 16, 2018, he set the M65 world record in the 100 meters with a time of 12.31 seconds (+1.3 m/s) in Grass Valley, California. The record stood until September 13, 2025, when John Wright broke it with a time of 12.15 seconds (+0.9 m/s).

On May 27, 2023, he set the M70 world record in the 100 meters with a time of 12.59 seconds (-0.2 m/s) in Los Angeles, California.

== Personal life ==
Leake was a cousin of NFL defensive tackle Roger Brown.
