= Masters M75 400 metres world record progression =

This is the progression of world record improvements of the 400 metres M75 division of Masters athletics.

Key

Incomplete information Pending better indoor records

Hand	Auto	Athlete	Nationality	Birthdate	Location	Date
	1:02.40	Guido Müller	Germany	22 December 1938	Elsenfeld	28 June 2014
	1:03.12 i	Guido Müller	Germany	22 December 1938	Fürth	2 March 2014
	1:03.90 i	Robert Lida	United States	11 November 1936	Bloomington	16 March 2012
	1:04.10	Hugh Coogan	Australia	15 August 1935	Brisbane	5 November 2011
	1:05.34	Wilhelm Selzer	Germany	7 May 1927	Potsdam	21 August 2002
	1:06.88	Lucas Nel	South Africa	20 July 1923	Gateshead	7 August 1999
	1:07.51	Antonio Chaina	Argentina	1923	Mar del Plata	6 September 1998
	1:08.24	Fritz Assmy	Germany	11 June 1915	Budapest	1 July 1990
1:08.5		Josiah Packard	United States	15 December 1903	Santa Ana	23 June 1979
1:09.9		Herb Anderson	United States		Gothenburg	9 August 1977
