= Masters M50 400 metres world record progression =

This is the progression of world record improvements of the 400 metres M50 division of Masters athletics.

Key

Incomplete information Pending

| Hand | Auto | Athlete | Nationality | Birthdate | Location | Date | Ref |
|---|---|---|---|---|---|---|---|
| | 49.98 | Ricardo Roach Gonzalez | Chile | 12 October 1972 | Santiago | 19 October 2024 | |
| | 50.51 | Juan Lopez | Spain | 14 May 1970 | Granada | 16 July 2021 | |
| | 50.73 | Roland Gröger | Germany | 7 August 1964 | Berlin | 25 June 2017 | |
| | 51.39 | Fred Sowerby | United States | 11 December 1948 | Orlando | 27 August 1999 | |
| | 51.60 | Guido Müller | Germany | 22 December 1938 | Hösbach | 3 June 1989 | |
| | 51.81 | Reginald Austin | Australia | 16 October 1936 | Melbourne | 4 December 1987 | |
| 51.8 | | Ron Taylor | Great Britain | 4 December 1933 | Swansea | 22 September 1986 | |
| | 52.24 | Ingo Vierk | Germany | 1935 | Rome | 29 June 1985 | |
| | 52.28 | Francis Peter Higgins | Great Britain | 16 November 1928 | Hannover | 1 August 1979 | |
| 52.9 | | Jack Greenwood | United States | 5 February 1926 | Gothenburg | 8 August 1977 | |
