= Payton Jordan =

American athlete & coach (1917–2009)

Payton Jordan (March 19, 1917 – February 5, 2009) was the head coach of the 1968 United States Olympic track and field team, one of the most powerful track teams ever assembled, which won a record twenty-four medals, including twelve golds. He was born in Whittier, California. Jordan was exceedingly successful as a collegiate track coach for a decade at Occidental College and for 23 years at Stanford University. A star three-sport athlete in his youth, Jordan more recently became one of the most dominant track athletes of all time, as a sprinter, in senior divisions (age 50 and over). Jordan died of cancer at his home in Laguna Hills, California on February 5, 2009.

== Education and early athletics competition ==
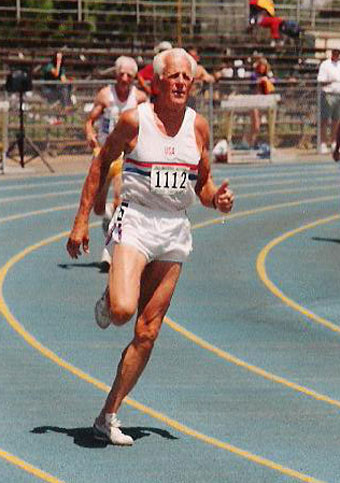
Former U.S. Olympic coach Payton Jordan of California sets a world record (30.89 seconds) in the M80 age group in the 200-meter dash at the USATF National Masters Championships in 1997 in San Jose, California.

Jordan excelled in track, rugby and football. Jordan was a star athlete at Pasadena High School in Pasadena, California, and graduated from the University of Southern California (USC), where he was captain of the Trojans' National Collegiate Athletic Association (NCAA) Championship track team in 1939. He helped the Trojans win two national collegiate team titles, in 1938 and 1939, and was a member of a world-record-setting 440-yard relay team, in a time of 40.5 seconds. Also in 1939, Jordan played on the Trojan football team that beat Duke University, 7-3, in the Rose Bowl. He won the Amateur Athletic Union (AAU) 100 meters title in 1941.

Jordan missed his opportunity to compete in the Olympic Games as an athlete (both the 1940 and 1944 Games were canceled due to World War II), so he opted to join the United States Navy instead.

Jordan has cited three mentors as instrumental to shaping his career, philosophy, and coaching style: at Pasadena High, track coach Carl Metten, and at University of Southern California track coach Dean Cromwell and football coach Howard Jones.

== Coaching career ==
Video on YouTube interview @18:02

At Occidental College, Jordan coached his team to two NAIA track and field championships and ten league titles. One of his athletes, Bob Gutowski, set a world record in the pole vault. During his 23 years as Stanford's track coach, between 1957 and 1979, Payton produced seven Olympians, six world record holders and six national champions. Jordan directed two of the greatest track meets ever held on American soil, the 1960 Olympic Trials and the 1962 USA-USSR dual meet, both at Stanford.

Jordan was the head coach of the 1968 US Olympic track team, and an assistant coach for the 1964 US Olympic track team. Billy Mills' upset victory in the 10,000 meters in 1964, the legendary leap of 29'2-1/2 by Bob Beamon in the long jump, the (third and) fourth gold medal in the discus by Al Oerter, the 100 meters sprint world record of 9.9 seconds by Jim Hines, Tommie Smith's gold medal win in the 200 meters in 19.8 seconds, and Lee Evans' world record (43.8 seconds) in the 400 meters were among the many Olympic highlights achieved when Jordan was coach.

== Masters division American and world sprint records ==
Jordan began competing again at the Lake Tahoe Masters meet in 1972, after encouragement from friends.

- World 100 m Masters records:
  - 55+, 11.60 Progression
  - 60+, 11.80 Progression
  - 65+, 12.53 Progression
  - 70+, 12.91 Progression
  - 75+, 13.72 Progression
  - 80+, 14.65 (1997, Modesto Relays, Modesto, California) Progression
- World 200 m Masters records:
  - 70+, 26.8
  - 75+, 28.14
  - 80+, 30.89 (1997, San Jose City College)
- American 100 m Masters records:
  - 60+, 11.8
  - 65+, 12.6
  - 70+, 12.91
  - 75+, 13.72
  - 80+, 14.65
- American 200 m Masters records:
  - 70+, 26.8
  - 75+, 28.14
  - 80+, 30.89

== Payton Jordan U.S. Track & Field Open ==
Each May, the Payton Jordan US Track & Field Open is held at Stanford University's Cobb Track and Angell Field. After being renamed in Jordan's honor, the event was first held under the new title on Memorial Day, May 31, 2004. Since its inception in 2000, the USATF Golden Spike tour event has brought international track superstars to Stanford. The event has also established itself as a premier stop on the international IAAF Grand Prix tour. More than 75 Olympians from dozens of countries have competed at the event.

== Documentary film role ==
- Jordan appeared as himself in the 1999 documentary film Fists of Freedom: The Story of the '68 Summer Games, which chronicles the events before, during and after the 1968 Olympic Games in Mexico City and again in the 2008 documentary film "Salute" which was written, directed and produced by Matt Norman. This film chronicles the story of the white man in the black power protest photo of Tommie Smith, John Carlos and Peter Norman during the 1968 Mexico City Olympic 200m event. Payton appears as himself.

== Recognition ==
In 1982 Jordan was inducted into the USA National Track and Field Hall of Fame, as well as separately in the 1996 inaugural class of the USATF Masters Hall of Fame Jordan is also a member of the U.S. Track & Field and Cross Country Coaches Association, USC, Occidental College, Stanford University, NAIA, Mt. SAC Relays and the National Senior Games Association Halls of Fame. In honor of his numerous outstanding achievements and contributions, in 2004 the US Open track meet at Stanford was renamed in his honor.
