= Masters M50 200 metres world record progression =

This is the progression of world record improvements of the 200 metres M50 division of Masters athletics.

Key

Incomplete information Wind aided Pending

Hand	Auto	Wind	Athlete	Nationality	Birthdate	Location	Date
	22.44	1.2	Willie Gault	United States	05.09.1960	Eagle Rock	07.05.2011
	22.53	0.1	Everad Samuels	Jamaica	10.04.1958	Valatie	05.07.2008
	22.58	0.9	Stephen Peters	United Kingdom	05.07.1953	Carolina	06.07.2003
	22.88	>2.0	Reginald Austin	Australia	16.10.1936	Eugene	01.08.1989
	22.91	-0.4	Ron Taylor	United Kingdom	04.12.1933	Malmö	31.07.1986
	23.15		Ron Taylor	United Kingdom	04.12.1933	Rome	28.07.1985
	23.40		Thane Baker	United States	04.10.1931	Wichita	06.08.1982
	23.81		Lloyd Snelling	Australia	1930	Brisbane	12.04.1981
	23.86		Wilbert Lancaster	United States	1928	San Juan	23.09.1980
23.7			Jack Greenwood	United States	05.02.1926	Gothenburg	10.08.1977
	23.99		Clifford Mc Pherson	Guyana		Hannover	1979
