= Anne McKenzie =

Former South African athete

Personal information
- Nationality: South African
- Born: 28 July 1925 Ceres, Cape Province, South Africa
- Died: 23 July 2014 (aged 88)

Sport
- Sport: Athletics
- Event: middle-distance

Anne McKenzie (28 July 1925 – 23 July 2014) was a South African athlete, who set several masters world records as early as the 1960s. She continued setting records, not only on the track but in road bicycle events as well.

== Biography ==
She had been the South African national champion in the 800 metres from its inception in 1963 for four straight years until 1966.

McKenzie finished third behind Anne Smith in the 880 yards event at the British 1965 WAAA Championships, where she set a South African record in a time of 2.09.4. Two years later she finished second to Smith in the same event at the 1967 WAAA Championships.
