= Evy Palm =

Swedish long-distance runner

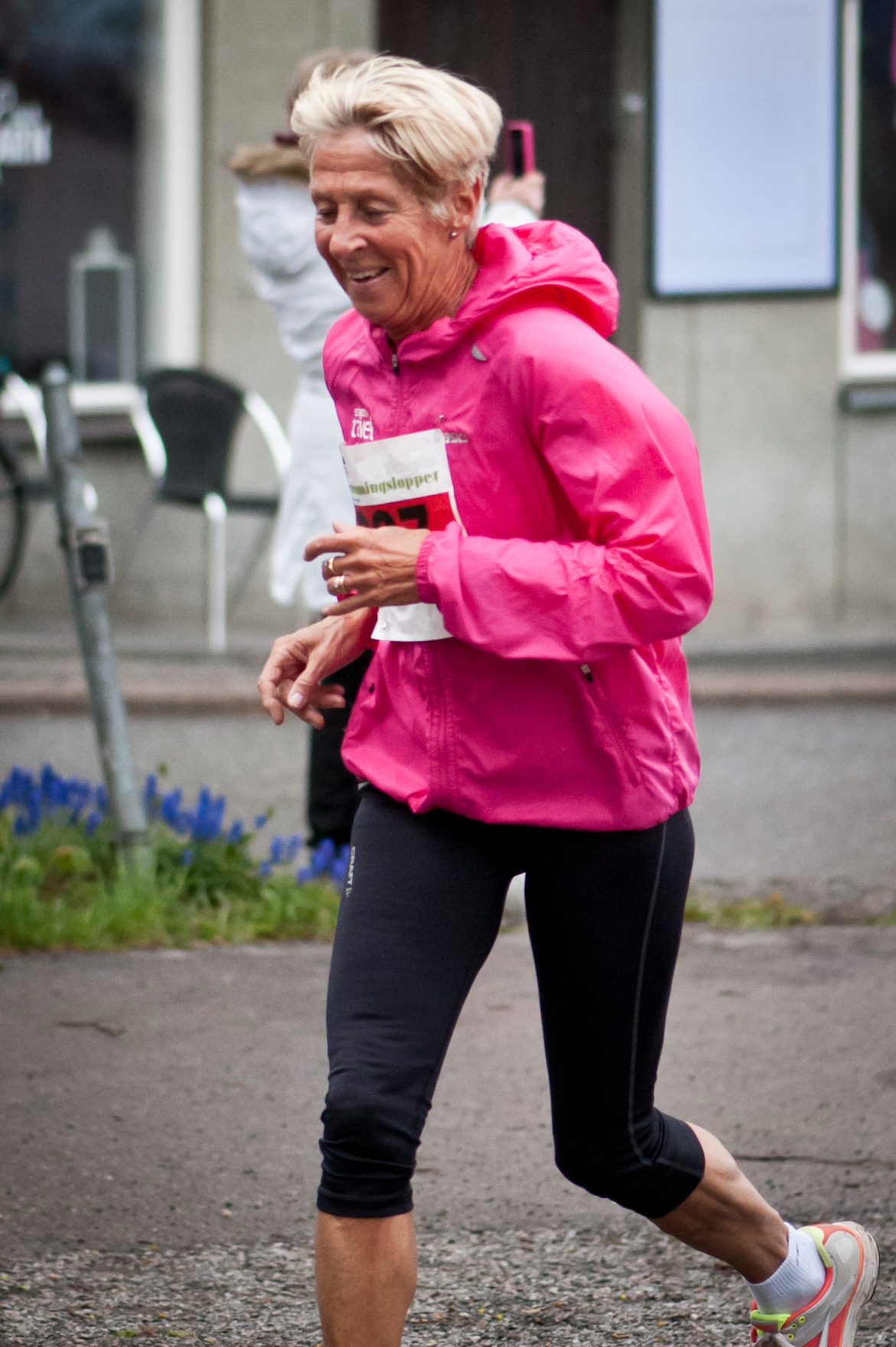
Evy Gunilla Palm

Evy Gunilla Palm (born 31 January 1942) is a female athlete from Sweden, who competes in the long-distance events. She represented her native country at the 1988 Summer Olympics, finishing in 24th place in the women's marathon at the age of 46. In the lead up to the Olympics, she set the current Masters W45 World Record in the 10,000 metres. Palm is a three-time winner of the Stockholm Marathon.

She won the City-Pier-City Loop half marathon in the Hague in 1988.

== Records ==
Her Swedish half marathon records:

- 44 years 1.12.11 Evy Palm Mölndals AIK 31jan42 Gothenburg 86-05-10
- 46 " 1.11.18 Evy Palm Mölndals AIK 31jan42 Östnor 88-07-16 VSM
- 48 " 1.16.23 Evy Palm Mölndals AIK 31jan42 Skellefteå 90-07-14 VSM
- 49 " 1.12.36 Evy Palm Mölndals AIK 31jan42 Haag HOL 91-03-24
- 55 " 1.25.08 Evy Palm Mölndals AIK 31jan42 Gothenburg 97-05-24
- 56 " 1.27.37 Evy Palm Mölndals AIK 31jan42 Gothenburg 98-05-16

Her Swedish marathon records:

- 44 years 2.32.47 Evy Palm Mölndals AIK 31jan42 Boston USA 86-04-21
- 45 " 2.35.14 Evy Palm Mölndals AIK 31jan42 Stockholm 87-05-30
- 46 " 2.31.35 Evy Palm Mölndals AIK 31jan42 London GBR 88-04-17
- 47 " 2.31.05 Evy Palm Mölndals AIK 31jan42 London GBR 89-04-23
- 48 " 2.38.00 Evy Palm Mölndals AIK 31jan42 New York USA 90-11-04
- 55 " 3.05.39 Evy Palm Mölndals AIK 31jan42 Stockholm 97-06-07 SM
- 56 " 3.04.27 Evy Palm Mölndals AIK 31jan42 Stockholm 98-06-07 SM
- 61 " 3.24.52N Evy Palm Mölndals AIK 31jan42 Stockholm 03-06-14

== Achievements ==
Year	Competition	Venue	Position	Event	Notes
Representing Sweden
1983	World Championships	Helsinki, Finland	41st	Marathon	2:51:49
1986	Stockholm Marathon	Stockholm, Sweden	1st	Marathon	2:34:42
1986	European Championships	Stuttgart, West Germany	19th	10,000 m	33:00.96
1987	Stockholm Marathon	Stockholm, Sweden	1st	Marathon	2:35:14
1987	World Championships	Rome, Italy	21st	Marathon	2:44:41
1988	Olympic Games	Seoul, South Korea	24th	Marathon	2:34:41
1989	Stockholm Marathon	Stockholm, Sweden	1st	Marathon	2:33:26
