= Jack Greenwood (hurdler) =

American track and field athlete from Colorado

Jack Eldred Greenwood (February 5, 1926, in Steele City, Nebraska – January 9, 2015, in Aurora, Colorado) was an American track and field athlete. He is the former world record holder in the 400 metres hurdles in the masters age divisions M45, M50, M55, M60 and M65. His hurdle records were so advanced, the shortest any of them lasted was almost ten years, all but one broken by the same athlete, German Guido Müller. He had a similar record over the short hurdles. He also had his time at the top of the M50 and M60 400 meters and ten years at the top of the M65 200 meters (plus the M50 record). Two of his marks survive to this day as American records.

Jack went to Argentine High School in Kansas City, Kansas, where he was the Kansas state high hurdles champion before joining the Army in 1945. His son Riley MacGregor Greenwood would follow in his father's footsteps winning the same race in 1977 for Medicine Lodge High School. Following two years in the Army, Greenwood ran for the University of Kansas, where he was a five time conference champion in hurdles, primarily the low hurdles.

Professionally, he was president and manager of the Barber County Savings and Loan Association of Medicine Lodge, Kansas. He also served on the local city council and school board. But he remained active in sports. In the formative years of Masters Athletics, Greenwood was part of the USMITT tour of Europe, which drew together the two most active continents. He was a winner at the first 1975 World Association of Veteran Athletes Championships, and continue to win until arthritis forced his competitive retirement in 1991.

Greenwood died on January 9, 2015, after several health complications.

Before his death, Greenwood resided in Aurora, Colorado, with his wife Nancy, who is a retired art teacher, and his youngest son Jack. Greenwood's other son, Riley, resides in Valley Center, Kansas, as a high school science teacher, with his wife, Diane, who owns a home daycare, and his son Jack, who is named after his grandfather.

He's simply one of the greatest age-group athletes in history.

— Ken Stone, Masterstrack.com

In 1997, he was in the second class selected to the USATF Masters Hall of Fame.
