= 1989 World Masters Athletics Championships =

Coordinates: 44.0424068°N 123.070692°W

- Dates: 27 July - 6 August 1989
- Host city: Eugene, United States
- Venue: Hayward Field
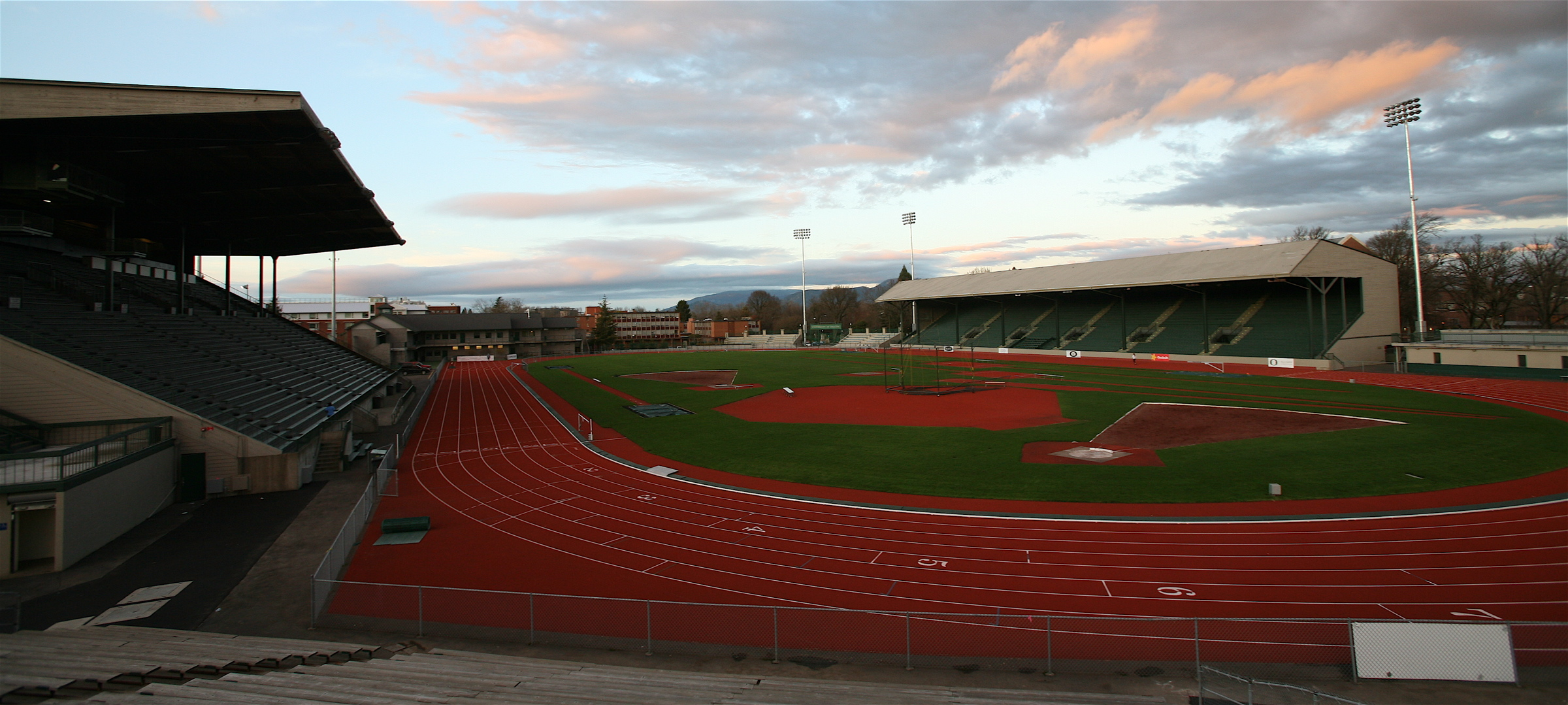
- Level: Masters
- Type: Outdoor
- Participation: 4951 athletes from 58 nations

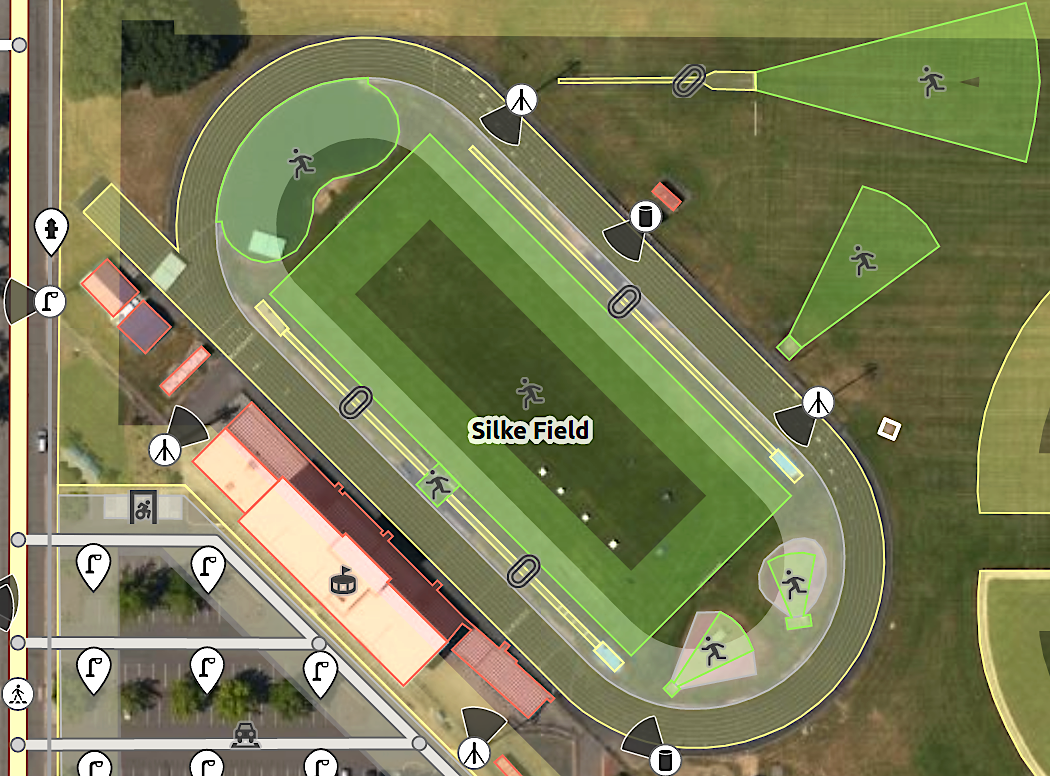
Silke Field

1989 World Masters Athletics Championships is the eighth in a series of World Masters Athletics Outdoor Championships (called World Veterans Championships at the time) that took place from 27 July to 6 August 1989 in Eugene, Oregon, known as the "Track Capital of the World" and as TrackTown USA. Athletes from the Soviet Union participated for the first time in this series.

The main venue was Hayward Field, which had hosted the United States track and field Olympic trials in 1972, 1976, and 1980. Some stadia events were held at Silke Field in adjacent Springfield. This championships was considered a bigger sporting event than those Olympic trials. Four-time Olympic Champion Al Oerter called these Championships "more like the Olympics than the Olympics", since participating athletes consistently outnumber those at the Olympic Games track and field events. The 4951 participants at this year's "world's largest track meet" dwarfed the 1617 athletics competitors at the 1988 Olympics in Seoul. The 1968 Summer Olympics 1500m gold medalist Kipchoge Keino carried a friendship torch into the stadium to light an Olympic-style flame during opening ceremonies on Friday, 26 July. The closing ceremonies was considered more moving than that of the 1984 Summer Olympics in Los Angeles.

This edition of masters athletics Championships had a minimum age limit of 35 years for women and 40 years for men.

The governing body of this series is World Association of Veteran Athletes (WAVA). WAVA was formed during meeting at the inaugural edition of this series at Toronto in 1975, then officially founded during the second edition in 1977, then renamed as World Masters Athletics (WMA) at the Brisbane Championships in 2001.

This Championships was organized by WAVA in coordination with a Local Organising Committee (LOC) of Tom Jordan, Barbara Kousky.

In addition to a full range of track and field events, non-stadia events included 10K Cross Country, 10K Race Walk (women), 20K Race Walk (men), and Marathon. Another non-stadia event was new for this series: a 10K Road Race, run through the streets of Eugene. In the stadia events, the Pentathlon was replaced by Decathlon for men and by Heptathlon for women, and women's steeplechase was introduced for the first time; the distance was 2K though the barrier height was the same as the men's at 91.4 cm for this Championships.

== South Africa ==
South Africa had been expelled by the International Amateur Athletic Federation (IAAF) in 1976 due to the apartheid policy of the South African government at that time. The participation of South African athletes in WAVA competitions had been at odds with the IAAF, specifically due to the 1977 WAVA constitution which had stated that

no competitor be barred because of race, religion, ethnic background, or national origin.

As a compromise, South Africans often competed at these Championships under the flag of other nations before 1987.

During General Assembly at the 1987 Championships, WAVA delegates approved a motion to amend the WAVA constitution and exclude countries whose national federation is suspended by the IAAF. Thus South African athletes were officially banned from these Championships, and would not be welcomed back until the 1993 edition in Miyazaki, after the abolition of apartheid and the readmittance of South Africa into IAAF in 1992.

== World Records ==
Past Championships results are archived at WMA. Additional archives are available from Museum of Masters Track & Field as a pdf book, as a searchable pdf, and in pdf newsletters from National Masters News.

Several masters world records were set at this Championships. World records for 1989 are from the list of World Records in the Museum of Masters Track & Field pdf book unless otherwise noted.

Key: Wind aided

=== Women ===
Event	Athlete(s)	Nationality	Performance
W60 100 Meters	Shirley Peterson	NZL	14.57
W40 200 Meters	Phil Raschker	USA	24.84
W55 200 Meters	Irene Obera	USA	28.48
W60 200 Meters	Shirley Peterson	NZL	30.15
W65 200 Meters	Paula Schneiderhan	FRG	31.65
W55 400 Meters	Irene Obera	USA	66.99
W60 400 Meters	Ann Cooper	AUS	68.00
W65 400 Meters	Anna Mangler	FRG	1:13.71
W45 800 Meters	Carol Flexer	USA	2:52.66
W60 800 Meters	Ann Cooper	AUS	2:52.66
W65 800 Meters	Anna Mangler	FRG	3:03.10
W70 800 Meters	Britta Tibbling	SWE	3:14.90
W75 800 Meters	Johanna Luther	FRG	3:32.98
W45 1500 Meters	Barbara Lehmann	FRG	4:45.84
W70 1500 Meters	Britta Tibbling	SWE	6:39.04
W75 1500 Meters	Johanna Luther	FRG	7:09.72
W45 5000 Meters	Joan Colman	USA	17:45.03
W55 5000 Meters	Marion Irvine	USA	19:32.07
W60 5000 Meters	Shirley Brasher	AUS	20:51.63
W70 5000 Meters	Pat Dixon	USA	24:52.83
W75 5000 Meters	Johanna Luther	FRG	25:43.39
W45 10000 Meters	Elaine Statham	GBR	37:34.45
W65 10000 Meters	Rosamund Dashwood	CAN	46:54.87
W70 10000 Meters	Pat Dixon	USA	50:28.33
W75 10000 Meters	Johanna Luther	FRG	53:20.50
W50 80 Meters Hurdles	Elżbieta Krzesińska	POL	14.06
W55 300 Meters Hurdles	Wanda Sakata Dos Santos	BRA	55.40
W45 400 Meters Hurdles	Marjorie Hocknell	GBR	1:06.02
W40 Triple Jump	Phil Raschker	USA	11.35
W50 Triple Jump	Elżbieta Krzesińska	POL	9.68
W40 High Jump	Yordanka Blagoeva	BUL	1.67
W45 High Jump	Joanna Meryl Smallwood	GBR	1.55
W45 High Jump	Christel Häuser	FRG	1.55
W60 High Jump	Christiane Wippersteg	FRG	1.23
W40 Long Jump	Silke Mattelson	FRG	5.37
W50 Long Jump	Elżbieta Krzesińska	POL	4.60
W55 Shot Put	Rosemary Chrimes	GBR	11.94
W60 Shot Put	Marianne Hamm	FRG	10.89
W55 Discus Throw	Rosemary Chrimes	GBR	40.86
W60 Shot Put	Marianne Hamm	FRG	32.68
W75 Shot Put	Johanna Gelbrich	FRG	19.44
W50 Javelin Throw	Gertrude Schoenauer	AUT	43.82
W60 Javelin Throw	Rachel Hanssens	BEL	30.58

=== Men ===
Event	Athlete(s)	Nationality	Performance
M40 100 Meters	Eddie Hart	USA	10.87
M40 200 Meters	Eddie Hart	USA	21.74
M50 200 Meters	Reginald Austin	AUS	22.88
M55 200 Meters	Ron Taylor	GBR	23.03
M40 400 Meters	James King	USA	48.44
M60 400 Meters	Jack Greenwood	USA	57.64
M65 400 Meters	Tom Hishon	USA	61.29
M50 800 Meters	Alan Bradford	AUS	2:00.40
M55 800 Meters	Tom Roberts	AUS	2:05.07
M90 800 Meters	Paul Spangler	USA	4:48.89
M40 1500 Meters	Wilson Waigwa	KEN	3:49.47
M60 1500 Meters	Derek Turnbull	NZL	4:28.66
M70 1500 Meters	John Gilmour	AUS	5:09.73
M90 1500 Meters	Paul Spangler	USA	9:30.76
M50 5000 Meters	Dan Conway	USA	15:43.58
M70 5000 Meters	John Gilmour	AUS	18:46.62
M75 5000 Meters	Alfred Funk	USA	20:55.39
M90 5000 Meters	Paul Spangler	USA	37:39.38
M55 10000 Meters	Norman Green	USA	33:00.66
M90 10000 Meters	Paul Spangler	USA	1:11:40.78
M70 2000 Meters Steeplechase	Daniel Buckley	USA	8:59.97
M50 3000 Meters Steeplechase	Nils Undersåker	NOR	9:50.96
M70 80 Meters Hurdles	Alfred Guidet	USA	14.50
M80 80 Meters Hurdles	Karl Trei	CAN	17.29
M50 100 Meters Hurdles	Charles Miller	USA	14.66
M55 100 Meters Hurdles	Richard Hickmann	USA	15.28
M40 110 Meters Hurdles	Stan Druckrey	USA	14.24
M40 110 Meters Hurdles	Richard Katus	POL	14.63
M60 300 Meters Hurdles	Jack Greenwood	USA	43.49
M70 300 Meters Hurdles	Daniel Buckley	USA	52.44
M40 400 Meters Hurdles	James King	USA	52.76
M50 4 x 100 Meters Relay	Ken Dennis, Gilbert LaTorre, Martyn Adamson, Robert Miller	USA	45.36
M70 4 x 100 Meters Relay	Jeff Bloomfield, Nathaniel Heard, Bill Weinacht, Payton Jordan	USA	45.36
M40 4 x 400 Meters Relay	Daniel Thiel, Kenneth Brinker, Richard Tucker, James King	USA	3:21.54
M50 4 x 400 Meters Relay	Jackson Steffes, James Mathis, Martyn Adamson, Larry Colbert	USA	3:35.88
M60 4 x 400 Meters Relay	Bernard Stevens, Charles Socher, Jim Law, Jack Greenwood	USA	3:58.43
M70 4 x 400 Meters Relay	Jeff Bloomfield, Payton Jordan, Jay Sponseler, Bill Weinacht	USA	4:35.07
M75 Long Jump	Morita Masumi	JPN	4.37
M80 Long Jump	Gulab Singh	IND	3.95
M40 Triple Jump	Milan Tiff	USA	15.70
M55 Triple Jump	Olavi Niemi	FIN	12.63
M60 High Jump	James Gillcrist	USA	1.66
M75 High Jump	Esko Kolhonen	FIN	1.44
M80 High Jump	Gulab Singh	IND	1.21
M60 Shot Put	Torsten Von Wachenfeldt	SWE	14.49
M75 Shot Put	Ross Carter	USA	12.45
M65 Hammer throw	Eino Anttila	FIN	48.56
M50 Discus Throw	Al Oerter	USA	62.74
M50 Javelin Throw	Bill Morales	USA	46.18
