= 1997 World Masters Athletics Championships =

Coordinates: 29.82633°S 31.03273°E

- Dates: 17 - 27 July 1997
- Host city: Durban, South Africa
- Venue: Kings Park Athletic Stadium
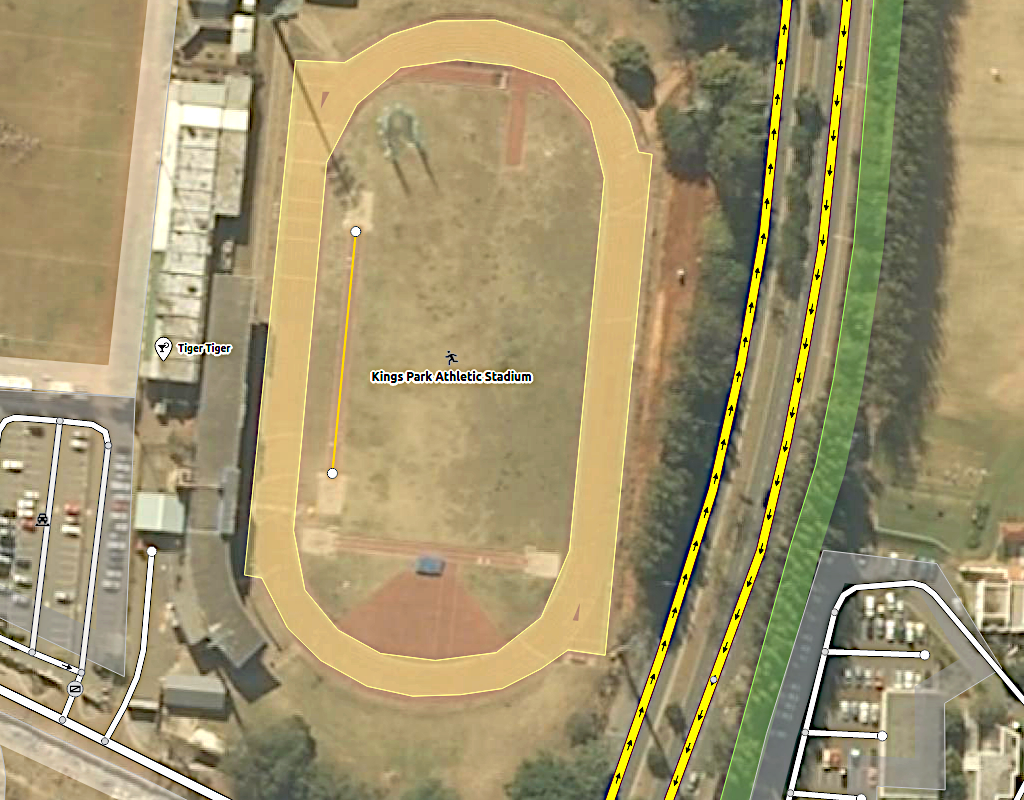
- Level: Masters
- Type: Outdoor
- Participation: 5735 athletes from 69 nations

1997 World Masters Athletics Championships is the twelfth in a series of World Masters Athletics Outdoor Championships (called World Veterans Championships or World Veterans Athletics Championships at the time) that took place in Durban, South Africa from 17 to 27 July 1997.

South Africa had been expelled by the International Amateur Athletic Federation in 1976 due to the apartheid policy of the South African government at that time. South Africa rejoined IAAF in 1992, after the abolition of apartheid. 1997 marked the first time that South Africa, or any African country, has hosted a Championships in this series. Other African countries that were represented for the first time were Botswana, Ivory Coast, Morocco, Zambia, and Zimbabwe.

The main venue was Kings Park Athletic Stadium located in the Kings Park Sporting Precinct. Another stadium within the complex also hosted many stadia events; that stadium was demolished in 2006 to construct the new Moses Mabhida Stadium.

This edition of masters athletics Championships had a minimum age limit of 35 years for women and 40 years for men.

The governing body of this series is World Association of Veteran Athletes (WAVA). WAVA was formed during meeting at the inaugural edition of this series at Toronto in 1975, then officially founded during the second edition in 1977, then renamed as World Masters Athletics (WMA) at the Brisbane Championships in 2001.

This Championships was organized by WAVA in coordination with a Local Organising Committee (LOC) led by Monty Hacker, Harry Naidu, and Linda Barron.

In addition to a full range of track and field events, non-stadia events included 10K Cross Country, 10K Race Walk (women), 20K Race Walk (men), and Marathon.

== World Records ==
Past Championships results are archived at WMA. Additional archives are available from Museum of Masters Track & Field as a pdf extracted from a National Masters News pdf newsletter.

Several masters world records were set at this Championships. World records for 1997 are from the list of World Records in the National Masters News September newsletter unless otherwise noted. Among the notable performances, Phil Raschker set 7 W50 world records, and the blind athlete Ivy Granstrom, who ran with a wrist tether attached to her guide, set 4 W85 world records.

=== Women ===
Event	Athlete(s)	Nationality	Performance
W40 100 Meters	Zdeňka Mušinská	CZE	11.99
W50 100 Meters	Phil Raschker	USA	12.65
W75 100 Meters	Paula Schneiderhan	GER	16.12
W85 100 Meters	Ivy Granstrom	CAN	28.61
W50 200 Meters	Phil Raschker	USA	25.72
W60 200 Meters	Irene Obera	USA	29.57
W75 200 Meters	Paula Schneiderhan	GER	34.40
W85 200 Meters	Ivy Granstrom	CAN	60.79
W85 400 Meters	Rosario Iglesias Rocha	MEX	2:13.66
W60 800 Meters	Jeanne Hoagland	USA	2:41.01
W85 800 Meters	Rosario Iglesias Rocha	MEX	5:00.58
W50 1500 Meters	Jutta Pedersen	SWE	4:52.43
W85 1500 Meters	Ivy Granstrom	CAN	10:33.40
W50 10000 Meters	Jutta Pedersen	SWE	36:44.47
W85 10000 Meters	Ivy Granstrom	CAN	95:17.92
W55 2000 Meters Steeplechase	Margaret Orman	NZL	7:58.43
W65 2000 Meters Steeplechase	Ulla Seger	GER	11:56.57
W50 80 Meters Hurdles	Phil Raschker	USA	12.68
W65 80 Meters Hurdles	Asta Larsson	SWE	16.39
W85 5K Race Walk	Margit Lindgren	SWE	41:52.51
W50 4 x 100 Meters Relay	Lorraine Tucker, Michael Hill, Johnnie Hill-Hudgins, Phil Raschker	USA	53.39
W70 4 x 400 Meters Relay	Johnnye Valien, Shirley Dietderich, Diane Friedman, Patricia Peterson	USA	6:26.99
W55 High Jump	Erika Stähle	GER	1.38
W60 High Jump	Christiane Schmalbruch	GER	1.36
W50 Long Jump	Phil Raschker	USA	5.27
W60 Long Jump	Christiane Schmalbruch	GER	4.75
W75 Long Jump	Paula Schneiderhan	GER	3.34
W40 Triple Jump	Conceição Geremías	BRA	12.48
W50 Triple Jump	Phil Raschker	USA	10.49
W60 Triple Jump	Christiane Schmalbruch	GER	10.03
W35 Pole Vault	Petra Herrmann	GER	3.13
W50 Pole Vault	Phil Raschker	USA	3.06
W60 Pole Vault	Dorothy McLennan	IRL	1.90
W65 Shot Put	Jutta Schaefer	GER	10.29
W65 Discus Throw	Ingeborg Pfuller	ARG	30.00
W80 Discus Throw	Annchen Reile	GER	18.50
W65 Hammer throw	Jutta Schaefer	GER	39.22
W75 Hammer throw	Ilse Bellin	GER	22.78
W60 Javelin Throw	Gertrude Schoenauer	AUT	40.00

=== Men ===
Event	Athlete(s)	Nationality	Performance
M90 200 Meters	Richard Gathercole	AUS	44.24
M65 400 Meters	Ralph Romain	TTO	57.27
M70 400 Meters	Wilhelm Selzer	GER	61.43
M60 800 Meters	John Wilson	GBR	2:20.07
M70 800 Meters	Derek Turnbull	NZL	2:28.37
M70 1500 Meters	Derek Turnbull	NZL	5:04.54
M70 5000 Meters	Derek Turnbull	NZL	18:34.61
M75 5000 Meters	James Todd	GBR	20:00.13
M90 5000 Meters	Alfred Althaus	GER	36:00.64
M55 3000 Meters Steeplechase	Ron Robertson	NZL	9:55.05
M85 80 Meters Hurdles	Vittorio Colo	ITA	19.82
M60 4 x 100 Meters Relay	Schmitz, Berthold Neumann, Rudolf Boeckl, Jürgen Radke	GER	48.46
M80 4 x 100 Meters Relay	Eugen Eble, Friedrich Mahlo, E. Pfanzelt, Muller	GER	73.43
M80 4 x 400 Meters Relay	Ludzuweit, Gerhard Theune, Eugen Eble, Friedrich Mahlo	GER	6:26.99
M60 Triple Jump	Pericles Pinto	POR	12.33
M85 Triple Jump	Vittorio Colo	ITA	7.32
M55 Shot Put	Wolfgang Hamel	GER	15.92
M85 Javelin Throw	Gerhard Schepe	GER	27.34
