= 1999 World Masters Athletics Championships =

Coordinates: 54.961111°N 1.579722°W

- Dates: 29 July - 8 August 1999
- Host city: Gateshead, England
- Venue: Gateshead International Stadium
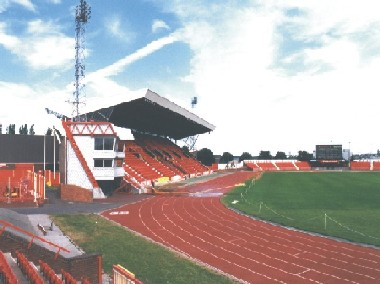
- Level: Masters
- Type: Outdoor
- Participation: 5843 athletes from 74 nations

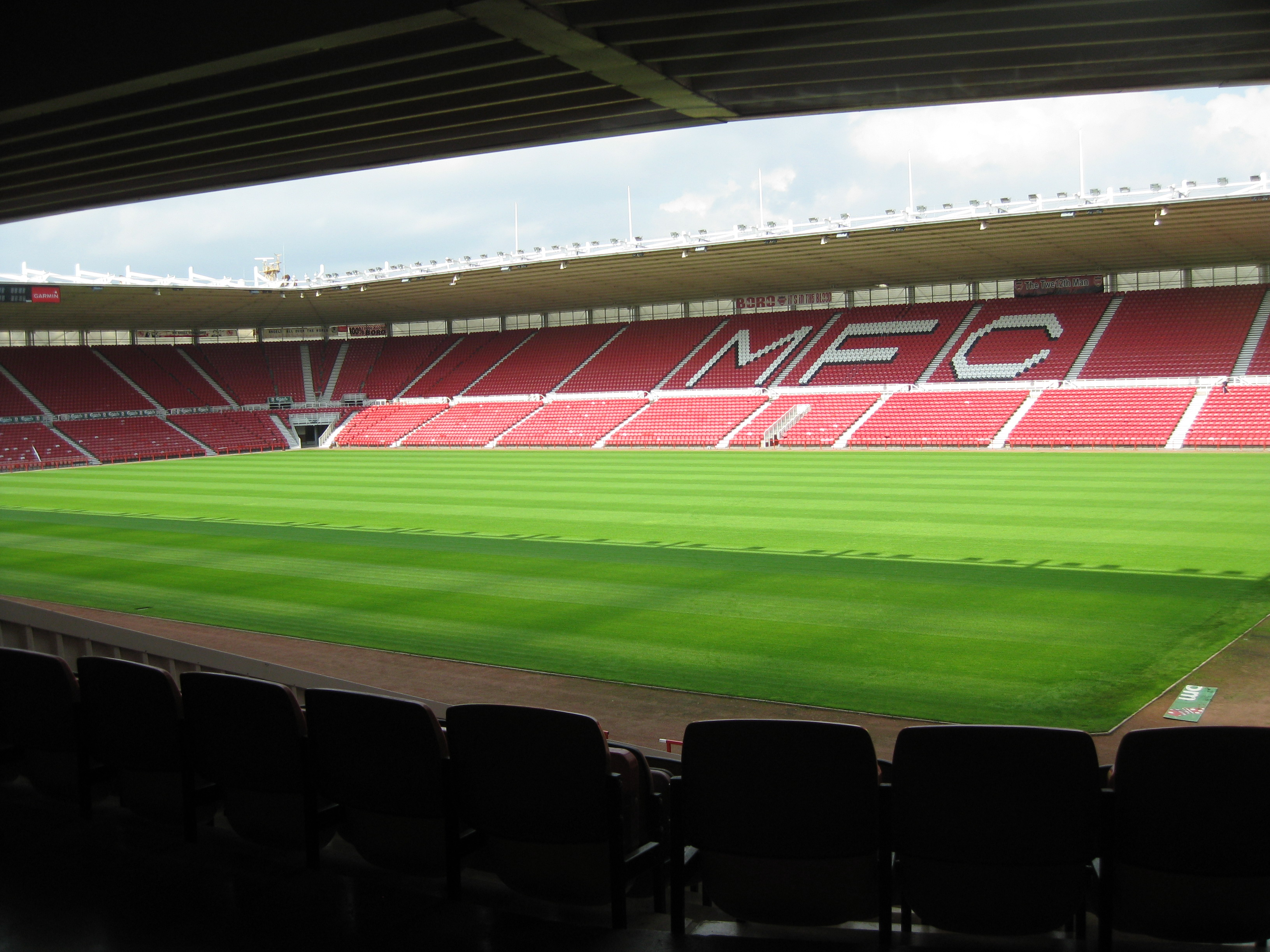
Riverside Stadium

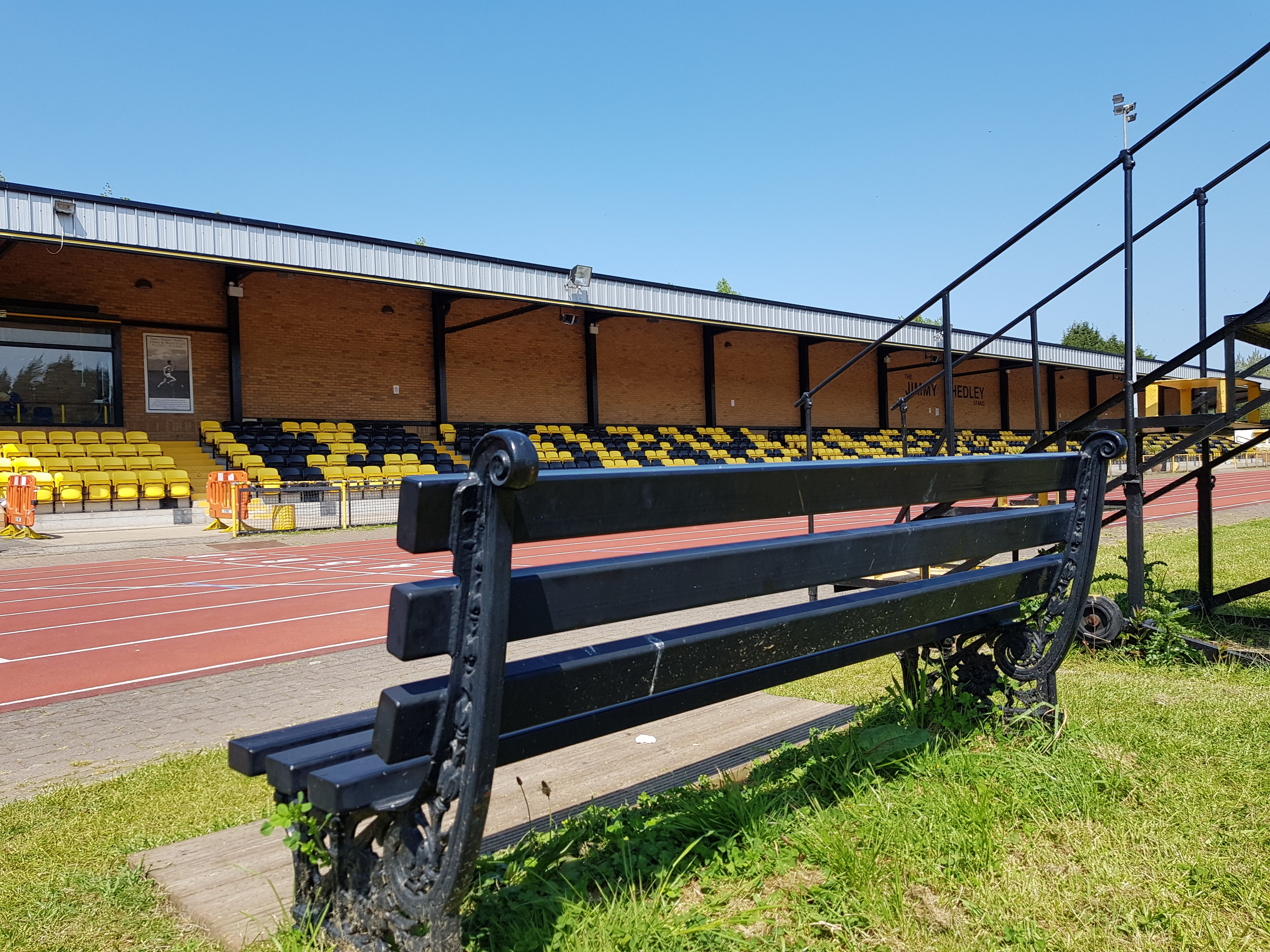
Monkton Stadium

1999 World Masters Athletics Championships is the thirteenth in a series of World Masters Athletics Outdoor Championships (called World Veterans Championships or World Veterans Athletics Championships at the time) that took place in Gateshead, England from 29 July to 8 August 1999. An official website was established for the first time in this series:

The main venue was Gateshead International Stadium; some stadia events were held at Riverside Stadium and Monkton Stadium.

This edition of masters athletics Championships had a minimum age limit of 35 years for women and 40 years for men.

The governing body of this series is World Association of Veteran Athletes (WAVA). WAVA was formed at the inaugural edition of this series at Toronto in 1975, then officially founded during the second edition in 1977. During General Assembly on 5 August at this Championships, a proposed amendment to change the name of the organization from WAVA to World Association of Masters Athletes (WAMA) was defeated, though the name would eventually be changed to World Masters Athletics (WMA) at the Brisbane Championships in 2001.

This Championships was organized by WAVA in coordination with a Local Organising Committee (LOC) led by Mike Newton.

In addition to a full range of track and field events, non-stadia events included 10K Cross Country, 10K Race Walk (women), 20K Race Walk (men), and Marathon.

== World Records ==
Past Championships results are archived at WMA. Additional archives are available from British Masters Athletic Federation as a pdf newsletter, from Museum of Masters Track & Field as a searchable pdf and as National Masters News pdf newsletters. Australian results are summarized in a Victorian Masters Athletics pdf newsletter retrospective.

Several masters world records were set at this Championships. World records for 1997 are from the list of World Records in the National Masters News September newsletter unless otherwise noted.

Key: Wind aided

=== Women ===
Event	Athlete(s)	Nationality	Performance
W65 100 Meters	Irene Obera	USA	14.29
W85 100 Meters	Nora Wedemo	SWE	21.98
W65 200 Meters	Irene Obera	USA	30.46
W85 200 Meters	Nora Wedemo	SWE	53.07
W75 400 Meters	Paula Schneiderhan	GER	1:28.42
W60 800 Meters	Gerda van Kooten	NED	2:36.94
W65 800 Meters	Jean Horne	CAN	2:51.41
W60 1500 Meters	Gerda van Kooten	NED	5:24.72
W45 2000 Meters Steeplechase	Victoria Adams	NZL	7:44.53
WSO 2000 Meters Steeplechase	Victoria Adams	NZL	8:13.92
W6O 2000 Meters Steeplechase	Sara Urrutia	PUR	9:59.23
W65 2000 Meters Steeplechase	Ana Tebes	ARG	10:30.07
W70 2000 Meters Steeplechase	Shirley Brasher	AUS	12:19.45
W40 80 Meters Hurdles	Jocelyn Harwood	GBR	11.55
W85 80 Meters Hurdles	Asta Larsson	SWE	16.11
W8O 5K Race Walk	Britta Tibbling	SWE	34:48.49
W85 5K Race Walk	Margit Lindgren	SWE	42:21.59
W40 4 x 100 Meters Relay	Gabi Horwedel, Susanne Fritsche, Silke Heitmann, Anke Moritz	GER	53.74
WSO 4 x 100 Meters Relay	Beatrix Blank, Ingrid Meier, Doris Gallep, Brigitte Schommler{	GER	5O.07
W6O 4 x 100 Meters Relay	Christiane Schmalbruch, Elfriede Hofman, Gerti Reichert, Erika Dreroll	GER	56.89
W35 4 x 400 Meters Relay	Virginia Mitchell, Jennie Mathews, Angela Beadnall, Linda Gabriel	GBR	3:50.80
W50 4 x 400 Meters Relay	Yvonne Priestman, Mary Waters, Lynda Robson, Sheila Carey	GBR	4:28.52
W6O 4 x 400 Meters Relay	Dorothy Fraser, Pamela Jones, Jean Hulls, Elizabeth Holmes	GBR	5:06.40
W45 High Jump	Debbie Brill	CAN	1.76
W75 High Jump	Helgi Pedel	CAN	1.10
W80 High Jump	Olga Kotelko	CAN	0.92
W75 Long Jump	Paula Schneiderhan	GER	3.61
W6O Pole Vault	Becky Sisley	USA	2.30
W65 Shot Put	Rosemary Chrimes	GBR	11.04
W65 Discus Throw	Rosemary Chrimes	GBR	33.27
W40 Hammer throw	Margrith Duss-Mueller	SUI	46.34
W75 Hammer throw	Kaija Jortikka	FIN	23.92
W45 Javelin Throw	Jean Lintern	GBR	37.79
W55 Javelin Throw	Karin Illgen	GER	33.18
W70 Javelin Throw	Rachel Hanssens	BEL	26.07
W40 Weight Pentathlon	Carol Finsrud	USA	4120
W5O Weight Pentathlon	Margarethe Tomanek	BEL	4313
W75 Weight Pentathlon	Kaija Jortikka	FIN	4234
W8O Weight Pentathlon	Olga Kotelko	CAN	3557

=== Men ===
Event	Athlete(s)	Nationality	Performance
M85 100 Meters	Vittorio Colo	ITA	17.57
M45 200 Meters	Stephen Peters	GBR	22.19
M95 200 Meters	Waldo McBurney	USA	63.08
M45 400 Meters	Stephen Peters	GBR	22.21
M75 400 Meters	Lucas Nel	RSA	1:06.88
M60 800 Meters	Alan Bradford	AUS	2:10.42
M70 800 Meters	Earl Fee	CAN	2:21.95
M70 1500 Meters	Simon Herlaar	NED	5:02.78
M90 1500 Meters	John Farrell	GBR	9:23.24
M60 2000 Meters Steeplechase	Alan Bradford	AUS	6:54.31
M65 2000 Meters Steeplechase	Francisco Vicente	POR	7:32.65
M75 2000 Meters Steeplechase	Soichl Tamoi	JPN	9:17.38
M80 2000 Meters Steeplechase	Dan Bulkley	USA	11:48.10
M75 80 Meters Hurdles	Melvin Larsen	USA	14.20
M60 300 Meters Hurdles	Guido Müller	GER	42.31
M80 300 Meters Hurdles	Dan Bulkley	USA	62.61
M65 5K Race Walk	Gerhard Weidner	GER	25:05.02
M95 5K Race Walk	Waldo McBurney	USA	57:06.80
M85 20K Race Walk	James Grimwade	GBR	2:24:00
M60 4 x 100 Meters Relay	Jürgen Radke, Rolf Temme, Hans Jürgen Gasper, Karl-Heinz Buss	GER	4B.17
M60 4 x 400 Meters Relay	Paul Johnson, Lawrence Colbert, Martyn Adamson, Mack Stewart	USA	3:53.87
M80 4 x 400 Meters Relay	Otto Ludzuweit, Eric Janicaud, Eugen Eble, Friedrich Mahlo	GER	6:35.98
M65 Long Jump	Lawrence Richards	USA	5.32
M60 Shot Put	Franz Ratzer	AUT	16.69
M85 Shot Put	Kasimir Gassmann	SUI	9.47
M85 Discus Throw	Ross Carter	USA	30.23
M95 Discus Throw	Waldo McBurney	USA	13.56
M60 Javelin Throw	Wladyslaw Kowalczyk	GER	57.91
M60 Javelin Throw	Alexsander Sakow	POL	57.79
M60 Javelin Throw	Berthold Maier	GER	53.22
M65 Javelin Throw	Olavi Rantanen	FIN	45.53
M70 Javelin Throw	Härje Noreborn	SWE	48.34
M40 Weight Pentathlon	Kenneth Jansson	USA	3937
M45 Weight Pentathlon	Vasilis Manganas	GRE	4267
M55 Decathlon	Rolf Geese	GER	8726
M75 Decathlon	Pekka Penttilä	FIN	7825
MBO Decathlon	Takuru Miura	JPN	46BO
