= 2001 World Masters Athletics Championships =

Coordinates: 27.558333°S 153.062222°E

- Dates: 1-14 July 2001
- Host city: Brisbane, Australia
- Venue: Queensland Sport and Athletics Centre
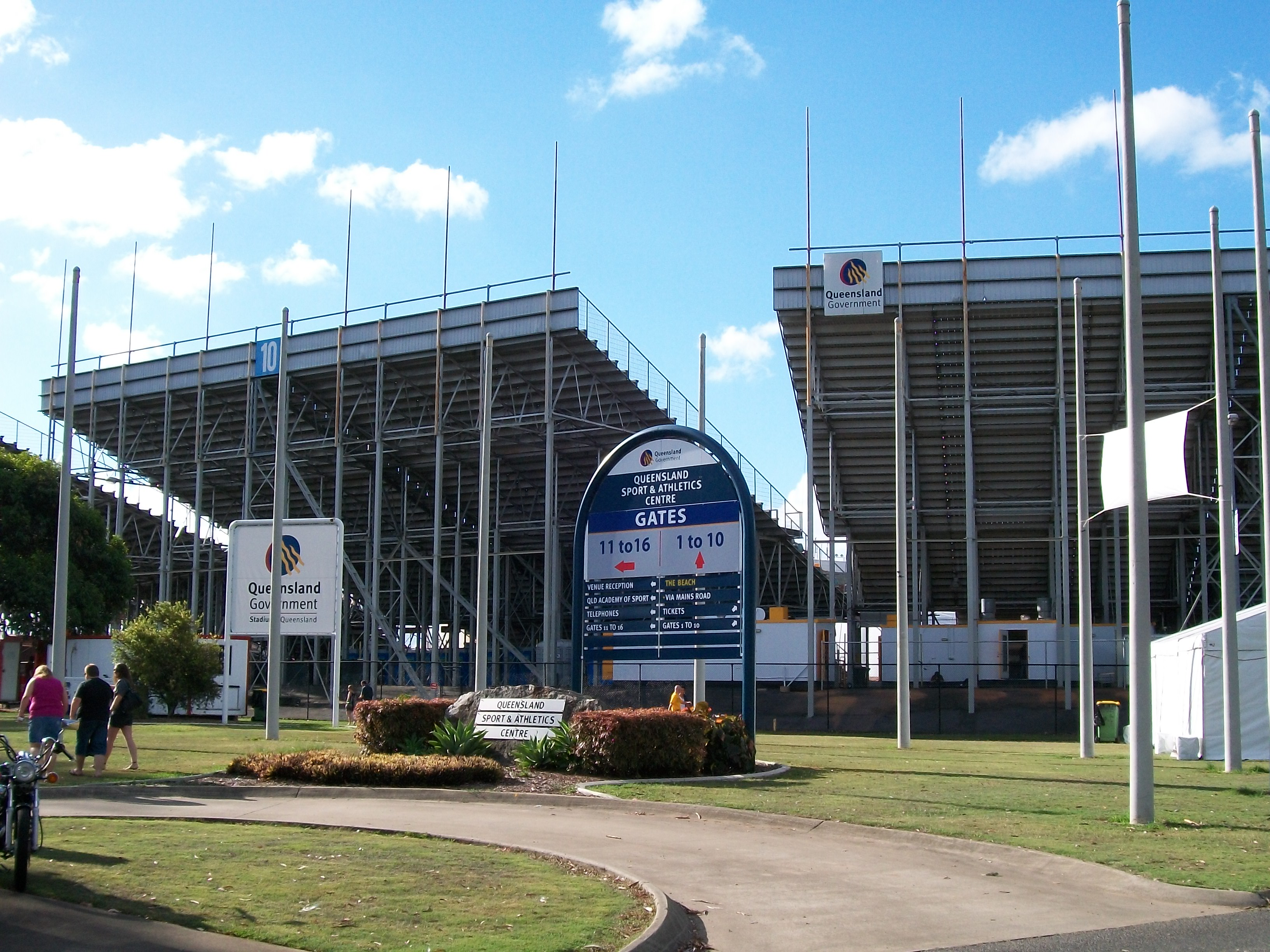
- Level: Masters
- Type: Outdoor
- Participation: 4903 athletes from 80 nations
- Official website: Archived 2002-06-03 at the Wayback Machine

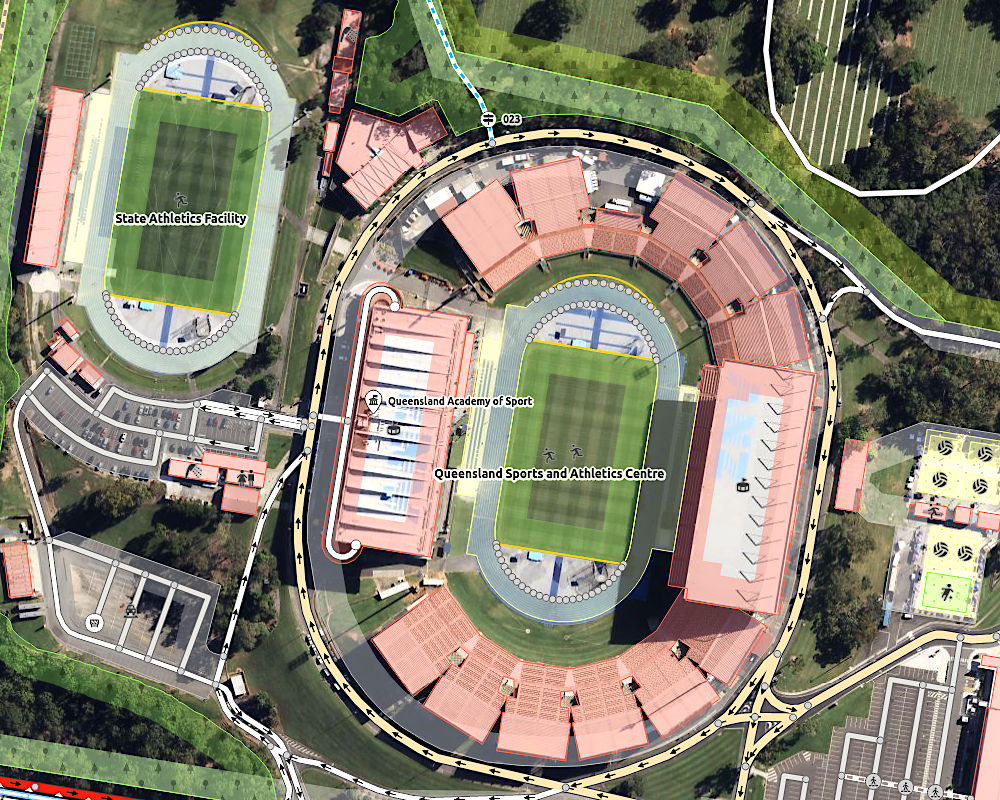
Queen Elizabeth II Sports Complex

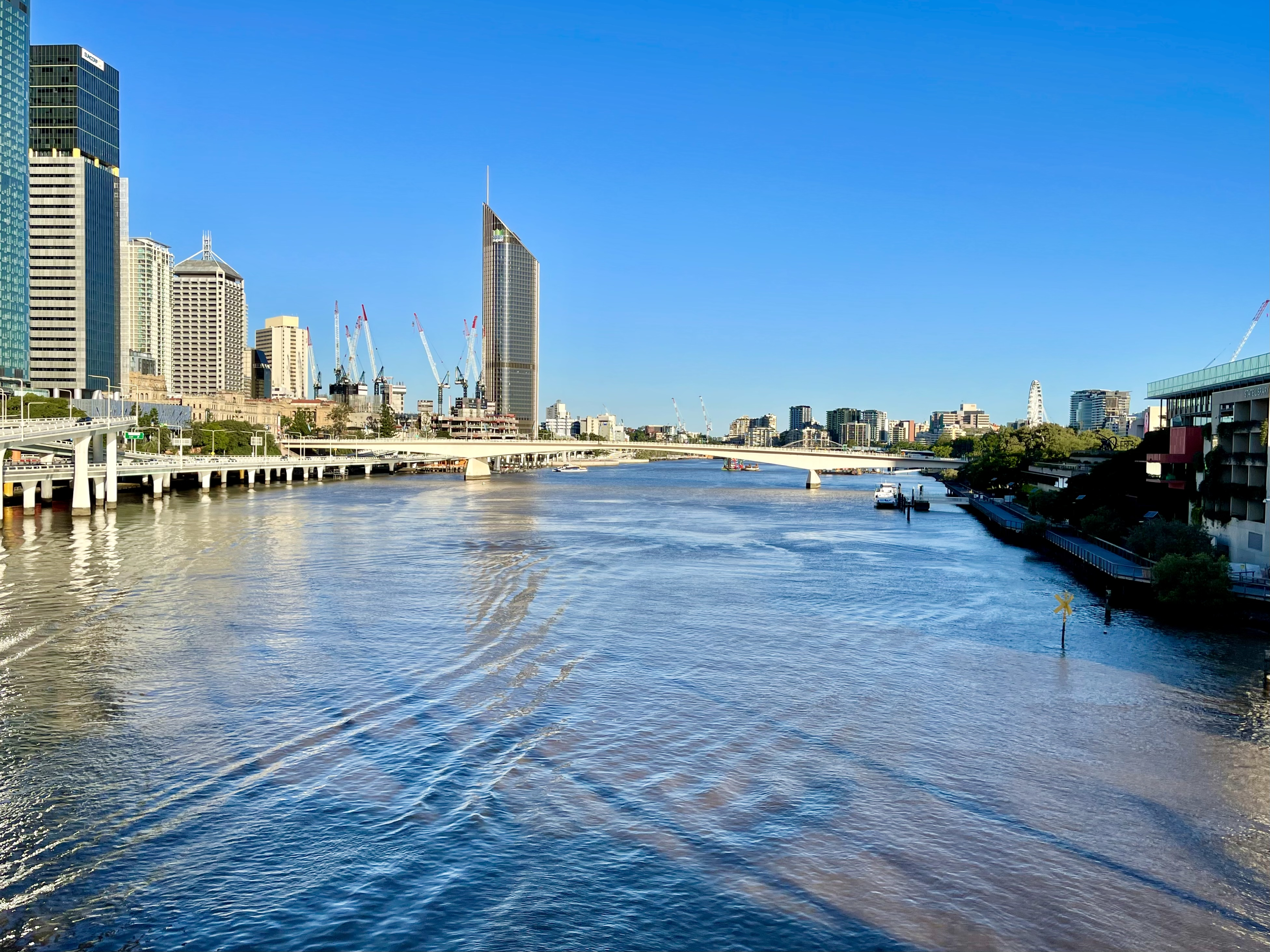
Brisbane River

2001 World Masters Athletics Championships is the fourteenth in a series of World Masters Athletics Outdoor Championships that took place in Brisbane, Australia, from 1 to 14 July 2001.

The main venue was Queen Elizabeth II Sports Complex, comprising Queensland Sport and Athletics Centre (called "ANZ Stadium" at that time) and the newly rebuilt State Athletics Facility. Some stadia events were held at University of Queensland Sport Athletics Centre. Non-stadia venues included St Lucia Golf Course for Cross Country and University of Queensland for Road Walks. South Bank Parklands hosted a 5K Fun Run/Walk before the start of competitions, and was the site for start and finish of the Marathon, which followed an inner city route and the Brisbane River.

This edition of masters athletics Championships had a minimum age limit of 35 years for women and 40 years for men.

The governing body of this series was formally renamed from World Association of Veteran Athletes (WAVA) to World Masters Athletics (WMA) during General Assembly at this Championships on 11 July, though the WAVA name was still used throughout the competitions and WAVA was prominent in the logo.

This Championships was organized by WAVA/WMA in coordination with a Local Organising Committee (LOC): David Lloyd, Kerry Watson, Jacey Octigan, Allan Bell.

In addition to a full range of track and field events, non-stadia events included 8K Cross Country, 10K Race Walk (women), 20K Race Walk (men), and Marathon.

== World Records ==
Past Championships results are archived at WMA. Additional archives are available from Masters Athletics, from European Masters Athletics as a searchable pdf, and from Museum of Masters Track & Field as a searchable pdf and as National Masters News pdf newsletters.

Several masters world records were set at this Championships. World records for 2001 are from the list of World Records in the National Masters News August newsletter unless otherwise noted.

=== Women ===
Event	Athlete(s)	Nationality	Performance
W60 400 Meters	Anne Stobaus	AUS	1:07.30
W65 400 Meters	Carolyn Sue Cappetta	USA	1:11.45
W90 400 Meters	Rosario Iglesias Rocha	MEX	3:06.85
W90 800 Meters	Rosario Iglesias Rocha	MEX	6:59.18
W40 80 Meters Hurdles	Leslie Estwick	CAN	11.25
W70 80 Meters Hurdles	Shirley Peterson	NZL	18.48
W75 80 Meters Hurdles	Johnnye Valien	USA	21.07
W75 300 Meters Hurdles	Johnnye Valien	USA	1:29.00
W40 400 Meters Hurdles	Maria Ferreira Santos	BRA	61:58
W6O 4 x 400 Meters Relay	Kemisole Solwazi, Yvette LaVigne, Carolyn Sue Cappetta, Jeanne Daprano	USA	4:56.74
W65 Pole Vault	Midori Yamamoto	JPN	2.20
W75 Pole Vault	Johnnye Valien	USA	1.65
W50 Triple Jump	Anna Włodarczyk	POL	11.37
W65 Shot Put	Sigrun Kofink	GER	11.35
W40 Hammer throw	Margrith Duss-Mueller	SUI	51.85
W40 Heptathlon	Marie Kay	AUS	5995
W75 Heptathlon	Johnnye Valien	USA	4939
W40 Weight Pentathlon	Oneithea Lewis	USA	4308
W50 Weight Pentathlon	Christine Schultz	AUS	4455

=== Men ===
Event	Athlete(s)	Nationality	Performance
M100 100 Meters	Leslie Amey	AUS	71.05
M85 400 Meters	Herbert Liedtke	SWE	1:30.99
M60 1500 Meters	Ron Robertson	NZL	4:27.65
M100 1500 Meters	Leslie Amey	AUS	19:59.54
M60 5000 Meters	Ron Robertson	NZL	16:16.51
M70 5000 Meters	Ed Whitlock	CAN	18:33.38
M70 10000 Meters	Ed Whitlock	CAN	38:04.13
M40 110 Meters Hurdles	Karl Smith	USA	13.96
M60 2000 Meters Steeplechase	Ron Robertson	NZL	6:30.21
M70 2000 Meters Steeplechase	John Downey	NZL	8:03.47
M85 2000 Meters Steeplechase	Eddie Gamble	AUS	13:53.38
M80 High Jump	Emmerich Zensch	AUT	1.31
M60 Triple Jump	Stig Bäcklund	FIN	12.43
M70 Triple Jump	Shoji Ito	JPN	10.49
M75 Javelin Throw	Veikko Javanainen	FIN	42.08
M85 Javelin Throw	Antonio Antunes Fonseca	BRA	24.56
M45 Weight Pentathlon	Vasilios Manganas	GRE	4590
M55 Weight Pentathlon	Ladislav Pataki	USA	5366
M70 Weight Pentathlon	Heinz Brandt	GER	4853
M75 Weight Pentathlon	Hans Schuffenhauer	GER	4826
M80 Decathlon	Pierre Darrot	FRA	7410
