= Masters M80 10000 metres world record progression =

This is the progression of world record improvements of the 10000 metres M80 division of Masters athletics.

Key

Incomplete information Pending

| Hand | Auto | Athlete | Nationality | Birthdate | Location | Date |
|---|---|---|---|---|---|---|
| | 42:39.95 | Ed Whitlock | Canada | 06.03.1931 | Sacramento | 06.07.2011 |
| | 44:29.26 | Ed Benham | United States | 12.07.1907 | Orlando | 04.08.1988 |
| | 47:44.60 | Fritz Helber | Germany | 20.12.1905 | Radolfzell | 06.09.1986 |
| 49:22.7 | | Paul Spangler | United States | 18.03.1899 | Gresham | 01.07.1979 |
