= Masters M85 5000 metres world record progression =

This is the progression of world record improvements of the 5000 metres M85 division of Masters athletics.

Key

Incomplete information Pending

Hand	Auto	Athlete	Nationality	Birthdate	Age	Location	Date	Ref
	23:51.51	Fokke Kramer	Germany	13 April 1938	85 years, 87 days	Kiel	9 July 2023	
	24:03.99	Ed Whitlock	Canada	6 March 1931	85 years, 146 days	Toronto	30 July 2016	
24:51.7		Gordon Porteous	Great Britain	20 February 1914	85 years, 148 days	Edinburgh	18 July 1999	
	25:44.02	Lucien Aellen	Switzerland	1912	82	Athens	4 June 1994	
26:50.2		Josef Galia	Germany	1 February 1898	87 years, 196 days	St. Augustin	16 August 1985	
28:03.8		Paul Spangler	United States	18 March 1899	85 years, 27 days	Fresno	14 April 1984	
