= Masters M65 3000 metres world record progression =

This is the progression of world record improvements of the 3000 metres M45 division of Masters athletics. Records must be set in properly conducted, official competitions under the standing IAAF rules unless modified by World Masters Athletics. The M45 division consists of male athletes who have reached the age of 45 but have not yet reached the age of 50, so exactly from their 45th birthday to the day before their 50th birthday.

Key

Incomplete information Pending

Hand	Auto	Athlete	Nationality	Birthdate	Location	Date
9:47.4		Derek Turnbull	New Zealand	5 December 1926	Christchurch	8 February 1992
	11:30.47	Pietro Nasi	Italy	11 December 1917	Turin	18 March 1984
