= Masters W80 3000 metres world record progression =

This is the progression of world record improvements of the 3000 metres W80 division of Masters athletics. Records must be set in properly conducted, official competitions under the standing IAAF rules unless modified by World Masters Athletics. The W80 division consists of female athletes who have reached the age of 80 but have not yet reached the age of 85, so exactly from their 80th birthday to the day before their 85th birthday.

Key

Incomplete information Pending

Hand	Auto	Athlete	Nationality	Birthdate	Location	Date	Age
	15:32.63	Melitta Czerwenka	Germany	30 April 1930	Saarbrücken	14 July 2011	81 years, 75 days
	15:34.64	Melitta Czerwenka	Germany	30 April 1930	Saarbrücken	29 July 2010	80 years, 90 days
18:20.6		Anne Clarke	United States	21 September 1909		7 July 1990	80 years, 289 days
	19:18.07	Ivy Granstrom	Canada	28 September 1911	Richmond	3 July 1992	80 years, 279 days
