= Masters M50 triple jump world record progression =

This is the progression of world record improvements of the triple jump M50 division of Masters athletics.

Key

Incomplete information Pending

Distance	Wind	Athlete	Nationality	Birthdate	Age	Location	Date	Ref
14.44 m	(±0.0 m/s)	Wolfgang Knabe	Germany	12 July 1959	50 years, 6 days	Lübeck	18 July 2009	
14.07 m	(+1.4 m/s)	Stig Bäcklund	Finland	27 October 1939	50 years, 250 days	Budapest	4 July 1990	
13.61 m	NWI	Horst Mandl	Austria	8 January 1936	52 years, 169 days	Verona	25 June 1988	
13.55 m	NWI	Hermann Strauss	Germany	6 March 1931	51 years, 130 days	Strasbourg	14 July 1982	
13.19 m	NWI	Dave Jackson	United States	26 August 1931	50 years, 318 days	Los Angeles	10 July 1982	
