= TrackTown USA =

American NGO

- Type: Non-governmental organization
- Purpose: track and field competition, fitness
- Location: Eugene, Oregon, United States
- Region served: United States
- Website: www.gotracktownusa.com

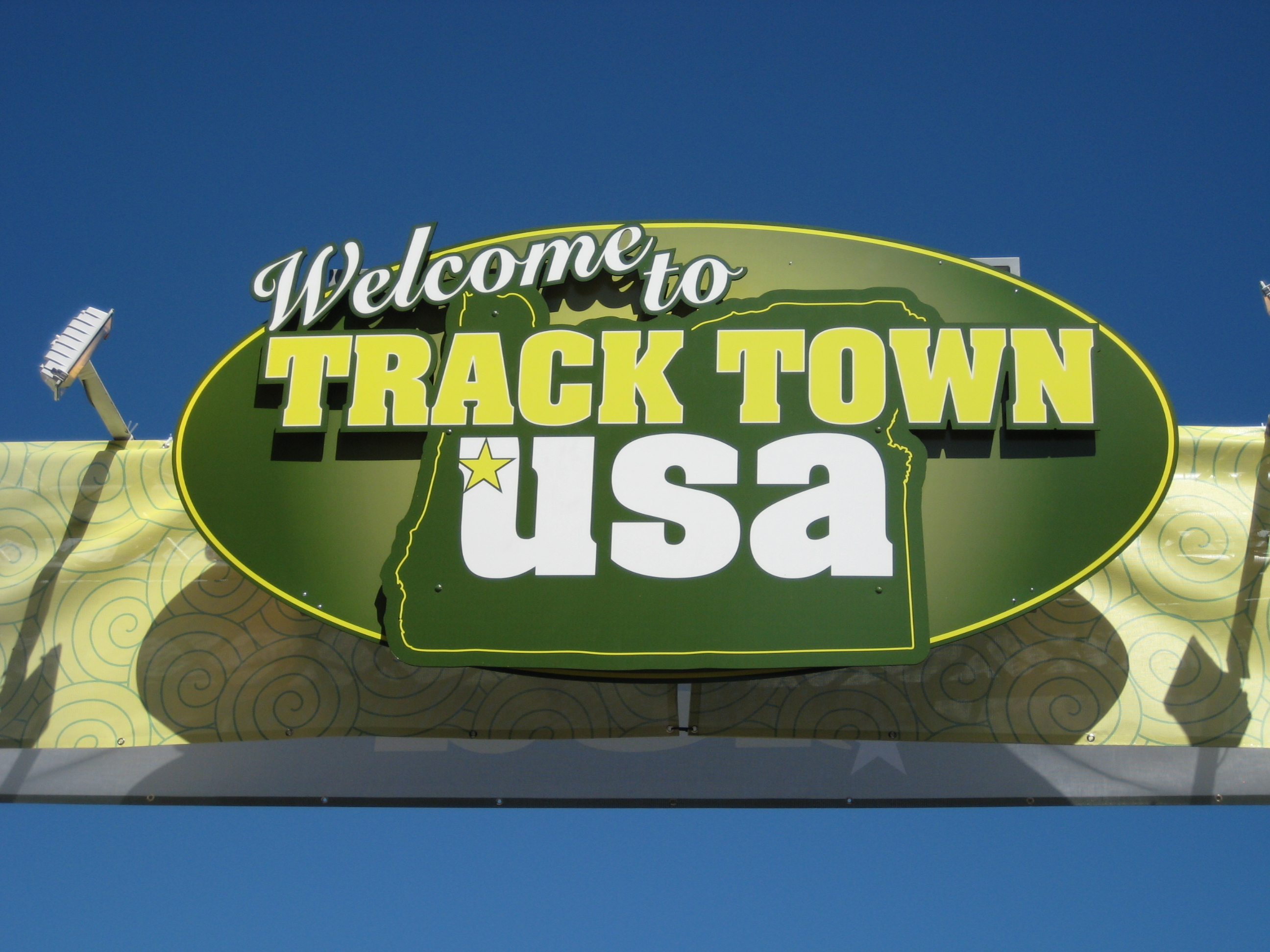
Welcome to Eugene, Oregon

TrackTown USA is a non-governmental, not-for-profit 501(c)(3) organization based in Eugene, Oregon, United States. The long history of the sport of track running in Eugene, particularly at University of Oregon's Hayward Field, earned the city its nickname as the "Track Capital of the World" and as "TrackTown USA." So the term "TrackTown USA" may refer to the nonprofit organization, Hayward Field, the Eugene-Springfield region, or the entire state of Oregon.

Besides organizing track and field competitions, TrackTown USA also provides community track & field awareness and youth fitness development activities. During track season, it holds a monthly town hall-style meeting at the Downtown Athletic Club called "TrackTown Tuesday."

== Popular culture ==
The 1998 movie Without Limits was about the distance runner Steve Prefontaine and his coach Bill Bowerman, shot on location in TrackTown USA.

The 2016 movie Tracktown was about a distance runner training for the Olympics in TrackTown USA.

== Major competitions ==
TrackTown USA has hosted many major track and field competitions.

=== NCAA Track and Field Championships ===
- 1962
- 1964
- 1972
- 1978
- 1984
- 1988
- 1991
- 1996
- 2001
- 2010
- 2013
- 2014
- 2015
- 2016
- 2017
- 2018
- 2021
- 2022
- 2024

=== USA Outdoor Track and Field Championships ===
- 1971 (men)
- 1975 (men)
- 1986
- 1993
- 1999
- 2001
- 2008
- 2009
- 2011
- 2012
- 2015
- 2016
- 2020
- 2022
- 2023
- 2024

=== United States Olympic Trials ===
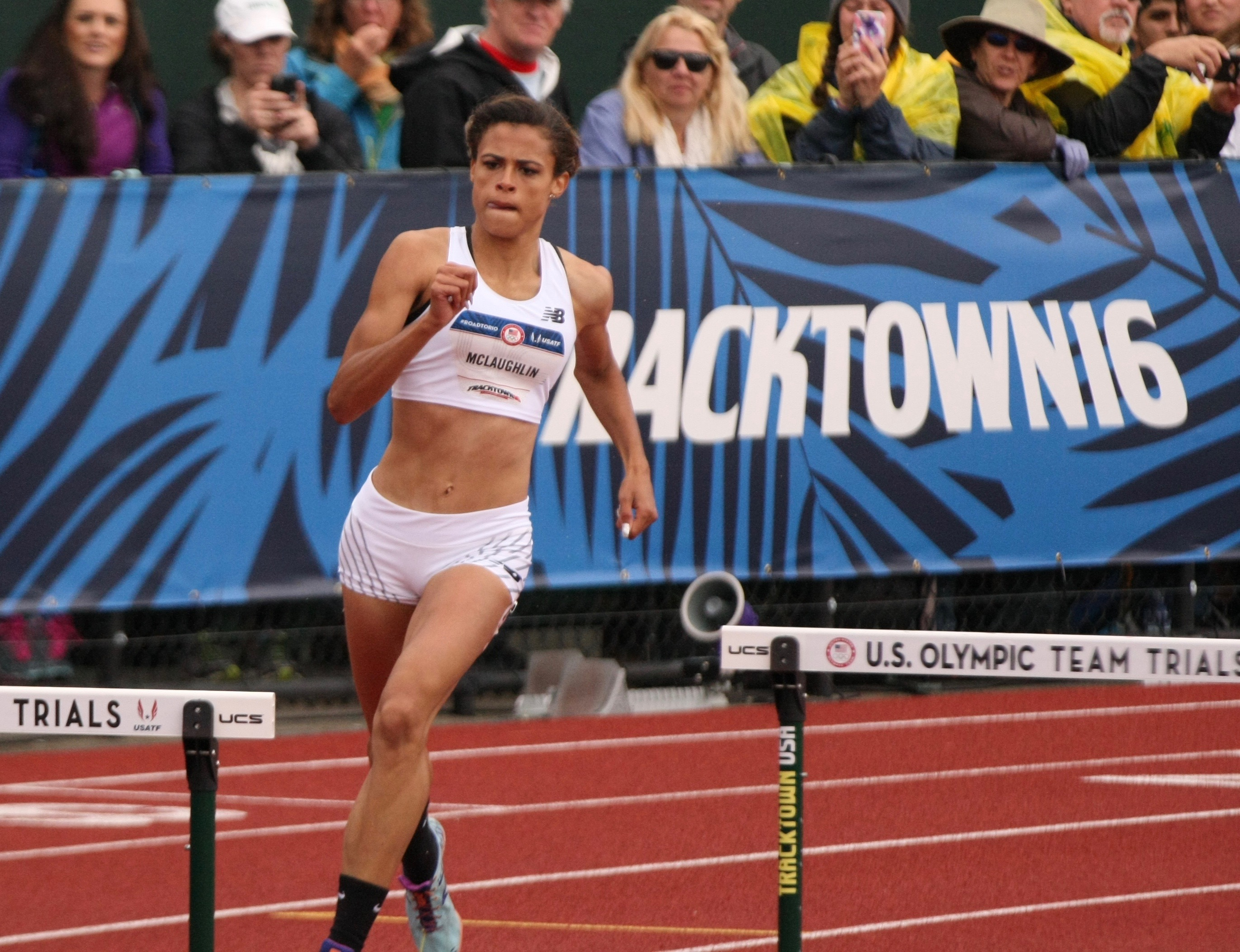
Sydney McLaughlin at 2016 US Olympic Trials

- 1972
- 1976
- 1980
- 2008
- 2012
- 2016
- 2020
- 2024

=== World Athletics Championships ===
- 1989 World Masters Athletics Championships
- 2014 World Junior Championships in Athletics
- 2022 World Athletics Championships
