= Masters W55 5000 metres world record progression =

This is the progression of world record improvements of the 5000 metres W55 division of Masters athletics.

Key

Incomplete information Pending

Hand	Auto	Athlete	Nationality	Birthdate	Location	Date
	17:29.28	Silke Schmidt	Germany	07.08.1959	Eindhoven	27.06.2015
	17:42.56	Silke Schmidt	Germany	07.08.1959	Den Bosch	05.09.2014
	17:52.82	Sandra Branney	United Kingdom	30.04.1954	Dunfermline	21.06.2009
	17:58.05	Bernardine Portenski	New Zealand	26.08.1949	Wellington	06.02.2005
18:32.5		Edeltraud Pohl	Germany	14.07.1936	Essen	25.01.1992
	18:56.07	Denise Alfvoet	Belgium	13.10.1935	Andenne	09.05.1991
	19:32.07	Marion Irvine	United States	19.10.1929	Eugene	04.08.1989
	19:32.86	Valborg Ostberg	Norway	14.05.1931	Malmö	30.07.1986
