= Masters men triple jump world record progression =

This is the progression of world record improvements in different age divisions of men's triple jump in Masters athletics.

Key

Incomplete information Pending better indoor records Indoor mark before 2000
IAAF includes indoor marks in the record list since 2000, but WMA does not follow that practice.

== Men 35 ==
Distance	Wind	Athlete	Nationality	Birthdate	Location	Date
17.92	0.7	Jonathan Edwards	United Kingdom	10.05.1966	Edmonton	05.08.2001
17.66	0.7	Jonathan Edwards	United Kingdom	10.05.1966	Glasgow	01.07.2001
17.56	0.5	Jonathan Edwards	United Kingdom	10.05.1966	Milan	06.06.2001
16.95	1.2	Ray Kimble	United States	19.04.1953	Budapest	12.08.1988
16.65	0.5	Jozef Schmidt	Poland	28.03.1935	Stockholm	30.08.1970
16.59	0.9	Jozef Schmidt	Poland	28.03.1935	Stockholm	30.08.1970
16.53		Jozef Schmidt	Poland	28.03.1935	Warsaw	09.08.1970
16.20		Mohinder Singh	India	15.03.1934	San Jose	02.05.1970
15.79		Dodyu Patarinski	Bulgaria	16.08.1933	Athens	29.06.1969
15.44		Eric Battista	France	14.05.1933	Béziers	15.09.1968

== Men 40 ==
Measure	Wind	Athlete	Nationality	Birthdate	Location	Date
17.32	+1.1	Fabrizio Donato	Italy	14.08.1976	Pierre-Bénite	09.06.2017
17.13	ind	Fabrizio Donato	Italy	14.08.1976	Belgrade	05.03.2017
16.93	-0.3	Fabrizio Donato	Italy	14.08.1976	Rovereto	06.09.2016
16.58	2.0	Ray Kimble	United States	19.04.1953	Edinburgh	02.07.1993
15.70		Milan Tiff	United States	05.07.1949	Eugene	01.08.1989
15.06		Michael Sauer	Germany	27.08.1941	Ludwigshafen	16.05.1982
14.91		Dany Nestoret	France	20.03.1940	Sevran	15.06.1980
14.84	1.0	Kristen Flogstad	Norway	11.04.1947	Tonsberg	13.05.1989
14.63	1.0	Sean Power	United Kingdom	20.03.1943	Portsmouth	10.05.1986
14.80		Stig Bäcklund	Finland	27.10.1939	Helsinki	07.08.1980
14.62		Horst Mandl	Austria	08.01.1936	Zagreb	06.06.1976
14.41		Hermann Strauss	Germany	06.03.1931	Schweinfurt	16.05.1971

== Men 45 ==
Distance	Wind	Athlete	Nationality	Birthdate	Location	Date
15.13	+0.2	Wolfgang Knabe	Germany	12.07.1959	Garbsen	22.05.2005
14.82	ind	Milan Tiff	United States	05.07.1949	Reno	26.02.1995
14.18	1.8	Stig Bäcklund	Finland	27.10.1939	Porvoo	28.07.1987
14.01		Pericles Pinto	Portugal	15.02.1937	Strasbourg	14.07.1982
13.90		Hermann Strauss	Germany	06.03.1931	Gothenburg	11.08.1977
13.77		Dave Jackson	United States	26.08.1931	Gothenburg	10.08.1977

== Men 50 ==
Distance	Wind	Athlete	Nationality	Birthdate	Location	Date
14.44	0.0	Wolfgang Knabe	Germany	12.07.1959	Lübeck	18.07.2009
14.07	1.4	Stig Bäcklund	Finland	27.10.1939	Budapest	04.07.1990
13.72	ind	Stig Bäcklund	Finland	27.10.1939	Kuortane	04.03.1990
13.61	nwi	Horst Mandl	Austria	08.01.1936	Verona	25.06.1988
13.55		Hermann Strauss	Germany	06.03.1931	Strasbourg	14.07.1982
13.19		Dave Jackson	United States	26.08.1931	Los Angeles	10.07.1982
13.13		Dave Jackson	United States	26.08.1931	Santa Barbara	03.10.1981
13.03		Carlos Vera Guardia	Venezuela	30.08.1928	Hanover	01.08.1979
13.04w	>2.0	Carlos Vera Guardia	Venezuela	30.08.1928	Hanover	01.08.1979
12.42		Tom Patsalis	United States	06.12.1931	Irvine	29.06.1975

== Men 55 ==
Distance	Wind	Athlete	Nationality	Birthdate	Location	Date
14.13	0.7	Wolfgang Knabe	Germany	12.07.1959	İzmir	28.08.2014
13.87	1.1	Wolfgang Knabe	Germany	12.07.1959	Erfurt	12.07.2014
13.85	1.3	Stig Bäcklund	Finland	27.10.1939	Kajaani	02.07.1995
13.35	ind	Stig Bäcklund	Finland	27.10.1939	Oulu	19.03.1995
13.11	0.2	Horst Mandl	Austria	08.01.1936	Kristiansand	01.07.1992
12.88		Hermann Strauss	Germany	06.03.1931	Ludwigshafen	01.07.1989
12.63		Olavi Niemi	Finland	07.11.1931	Eugene	03.08.1989
12.78		Olavi Niemi	Finland	07.11.1931	Larvik	02.07.1989
12.82		Hermann Strauss	Germany	06.03.1931	Essen	02.08.1987
12.75		Hermann Strauss	Germany	06.03.1931	Malmoe	28.07.1986
12.35	2.0	Matti Jarvinen	Finland	23.02.1926	Larvik	08.08.1981
12.62		Gordon Farrell	United States	24.11.1917	Palm Desert	08.01.1975

== Men 60 ==
Distance	Wind	Athlete	Nationality	Birthdate	Location	Date
12.82	0.2	Wolfgang Knabe	Germany	12.07.1959	Garbsen	10.07.2021
12.68	1.6	Stig Bäcklund	Finland	27.10.1939	Kajaani	18.06.2000
12.33	0.3	Pericles Pinto	Portugal	15.02.1937	Durban	23.07.1997
12.33	0.5	Hermann Strauss	Germany	06.03.1931	Turku	26.07.1991
12.13	ind	Amelio Compri	Italy	31.01.1925	Turin	09.03.1985
12.01		Jakob Rypdal	Norway	19.02.1926	Melbourne	05.12.1987
12.01		Vaclav Bartl	Sweden	05.03.1926	Melbourne	05.12.1987
11.96		Tom Patsalis	United States	06.12.1931	Los Angeles	10.07.1982
11.89		Gordon Farrell	United States	24.11.1917	Van Nuys	24.05.1980
11.34		Gordon Farrell	United States	24.11.1917	Santa Barbara	06.10.1979
11.25		Gordon Farrell	United States	24.11.1917	Cali	09.12.1977

== Men 65 ==
Distance	Wind	Athlete	Nationality	Birthdate	Age	Location	Date	Ref
12.16 m	(+1.1 m/s)	Wolfgang Knabe	Germany	12 July 1959	66 years, 42 days	Gotha	23 August 2025	
11.94 m	(+2.0 m/s)	Hermann Strauss	Germany	6 March 1931	65 years, 165 days	Leinfelden	18 March 1996	
11.24 m	NWI	Ariel Standen Levis	Chile	12 September 1929	65	Concepción	1994	
11.11 m	(+0.8 m/s)	Matti Järvinen	Finland	23 February 1926	65 years, 154 days	Turku	27 July 1991	
10.95 m i		Jakob Rypdal	Norway	19 February 1936	55 years, 5 days	Ekeberg	24 February 1991	
10.95 m	(+1.8 m/s)	Vaclav Bartl	Sweden	5 March 1926	65 years, 117 days	Glostrup	30 June 1991	
11.10 m	NWI	Amelio Compri	Italy	31 January 1925	65 years, 123 days	Verona	3 June 1990	
10.92 m i		Amelio Compri	Italy	31 January 1925	65 years, 31 days	Turin	3 March 1990	
10.87 m	NWI	Kenneth McConnell	Australia	30 August 1924	65 years, 136 days	Hobart	13 January 1990	
10.86 m i		Tom Patsalis	United States	6 December 1921	65 years, 113 days	Madison	29 March 1987	
10.66 m i		Ian Hume	Canada	20 August 1914	66 years, 146 days	Christchurch	13 January 1981	
10.54 m	NWI	Heikki Simola	Finland	16 January 1912	67 years, 197 days	Hanover	1 August 1979	
10.48 m	NWI	Ivar Sand	Norway	17 July 1912	66 years, 58 days	Viareggio	13 September 1978	
10.42 m	NWI	Ivar Sand	Norway	17 July 1912	65 years, 22 days	Gothenburg	8 August 1977	

== Men 70 ==
Distance	Wind	Athlete	Nationality	Birthdate	Age	Location	Date	Ref
10.77 m	(+1.0 m/s)	Arne Tefre	Norway	3 June 1955	70 years, 138 days	Madeira	19 October 2025	
10.76 m	(+0.3 m/s)	Crecenzo Marchetti	Italy	24 March 1951	71 years, 44 days	Mantua	7 May 2022	
10.90 m	(+1.0 m/s)	Adam Adamec	Poland	22 May 1947	70 years, 110 days	Zielona Góra	9 September 2017	
10.88 m i		Pertti Ahomäki	Finland	26 February 1946	70 years, 36 days	Ancona	2 April 2016	
10.75 m	(+0.3 m/s)	Lamberto Boranga	Italy	31 October 1942	70 years, 3 days	Serravalle	3 November 2012	
10.71 m i		Stig Bäcklund	Finland	27 October 1939	71 years, 81 days	Salo	16 January 2011	
10.71 m	NWI	Kyoichiro Shimizu	Japan	2 January 1940	70 years, 232 days	Maebashi	22 August 2010	
10.61 m	(+1.6 m/s)	Shoji Ito	Japan	24 October 1930	70 years, 10 days	Shizuoka	3 November 2000	
10.41 m	(+1.9 m/s)	Vaclav Bartl	Sweden	5 March 1926	70 years, 141 days	Malmö	24 July 1996	
10.29 m	(+1.8 m/s)	Rolf Gustavsson	Sweden	7 January 1917	70 years, 207 days	Pori	2 August 1987	
10.25 m	NWI	Mazumi Morita	Japan	17 July 1913	72 years, 88 days	Tokushima	13 October 1985	
10.17 m	NWI	Ian Hume	Canada	20 August 1914	70 years, 306 days	Rome	22 June 1985	

== Men 75 ==
Distance	Wind	Athlete	Nationality	Birthdate	Age	Location	Date	Ref
10.12 m	(+1.6 m/s)	Olle Borg	Sweden	1 October 1947	76 years, 347 days	Arvika	12 September 2024	
10.10 m	(−0.6 m/s)	Lothar Fischer	Germany	15 March 1936	75 years, 136 days	Minden	29 July 2011	
10.05 m		Mazumi Morita	Japan	17 July 1913	75 years, 14 days	Akita	31 July 1988	
9.52 m		Heikki Simola	Finland	16 January 1912	75 years, 322 days	Melbourne	4 December 1987	
9.60 m		Heikki Simola	Finland	16 January 1912	75 years, 170 days	Salo	5 July 1987	
9.40 m i		Heikki Simola	Finland	16 January 1912	75 years, 52 days	Vierumäki	9 March 1987	
8.29 m		Gulab Singh	India	13 October 1905	75 years, 91 days	Christchurch	12 January 1981	

== Men 80 ==
Distance	Wind	Athlete	Nationality	Birthdate	Location	Date
9.29	-0.1	Eberhard Linke	Germany	3 January 1944	Erding	15 June 2024
9.04	0.1	Lothar Fischer	Germany	15 March 1936	Leinefelde	9 July 2016
8.95	0.3	Mazumi Morita	Japan	17 July 1913	Miyazaki	13 October 1993
8.29		Gulab Singh	India	13 October 1905	Melbourne	4 December 1987
7.72		Winfield McFadden	United States	12 March 1905	Santa Barbara	4 October 1986
7.17		Ian Hume	Canada	20 August 1914	Uniondale	19 July 1986
7.44		Winfield McFadden	United States	12 March 1905	Irvine	25 May 1985
6.91		Herbert Anderson	United States	15 July 1902	Aurora	24 July 1982

== Men 85 ==
Distance	Wind	Athlete	Nationality	Birthdate	Location	Date
8.17	0.7	Aatos Sainio	Finland	07.06.1925	Tampere	04.07.2010
7.91	-0.7	Mazumi Morita	Japan	17.07.1913	Musashino	26.07.1998
7.65	0.0	Vittorio Colo	Italy	09.11.1911	Milan	15.06.1997
7.44		Kizo Kimura	Japan	11.07.1911		29.04.1997
7.18		Kizo Kimura	Japan	11.07.1911	Toyama	16.09.1996
7.01		Hiroshi Aoyama	Japan	10.05.1909	Ageo	16.09.1994
6.78		Karl Trei	Canada	19.03.1909	Raleigh	07.05.1994
6.67	ind	Karl Trei	Canada	19.03.1909	Columbia	25.03.1994

== Men 90 ==
Distance	Wind	Athlete	Nationality	Birthdate	Location	Date
7.10	0.6	Aatos Saino	Finland	7 June 1925	Kangasala	22 July 2015
6.59	0.7	Kizo Kimura	Japan	11 July 1911	Chiba	29 July 2001
6.01	0.0	Hiroshi Aoyama	Japan	10 May 1909	Yonago	27 June 1999
5.51		Buell Crane	United States	18 March 1900	Gresham	28 July 1990
