= Masters M90 1500 metres world record progression =

This is the progression of world record improvements of the 1500 metres M90 division of Masters athletics.

Key

Incomplete information Pending

Hand	Auto	Athlete	Nationality	Birthdate	Age	Location	Date
	7:32.95	David Carr	Australia	15 June 1932	90 years, 78 days	Perth	1 September 2022
	7:37.08	Toshio Kamehama	Japan	18 October 1925	90 years, 13 days	Gifu	31 October 2015
	8:01.74	Yoshimitsu Miyauchi	Japan	20 July 1924	90 years, 91 days	Kagoshima	19 October 2014
	8:07.17	Holger Josefsson	Sweden	4 October 1918	90 years, 297 days	Lahti	28 July 2009
8:40.0		Petter Green	Norway	24 March 1912	90 years, 150 days	Stjørdal	21 August 2002
	9:23.24	John Farrell	United Kingdom	12 June 1909	90 years, 56 days	Gateshead	7 August 1999
9:25.2		Paul Spangler	United States	18 March 1899	90 years, 84 days		10 June 1989
