= Masters M90 5000 metres world record progression =

This is the progression of world record improvements of the 5000 metres M90 division of Masters athletics.

Key

Incomplete information Pending

Hand	Auto	Athlete	Nationality	Birthdate	Age	Location	Date
	29:28.60	David Carr	Australia	15 June 1932	90 years, 120 days	Perth	13 October 2022
	29:47.83	David Carr	Australia	15 June 1932	90 years, 18 days	Tampere	3 July 2022
	29:59.94	Yoshimitsu Miyauchi	Japan	20 July 1924	90 years, 62 days	Kitakami	20 September 2014
	31:25.45	Gordon Porteous	Great Britain	20 February 1914	90 years, 127 days	Birmingham	26 June 2004
32:48.0		Petter Green	Norway	24 March 1912	90 years, 165 days	Levanger	5 September 2002
33:17.0		Alfred Althaus	Germany	30 October 1903	91 years, 238 days	Essen	25 June 1995
	37:39.38	Paul Spangler	United States	18 March 1899	90 years, 136 days	Eugene	1 August 1989
