= Silver into Gold (film) =

1987 film

- Produced by: Lynn Mueller
- Production company: Stanford University
- Distributed by: Barr Films
- Release date: 1987
- Country: United States
- Language: English

Silver into Gold is a 1987 American short documentary film produced by Lynn Mueller. It was nominated for an Academy Award for Best Documentary Short. The film looks at American athletes Gail Roper and Marion Irvine.
