= Masters M55 800 metres world record progression =

This is the progression of world record improvements of the 800 metres M55 division of Masters athletics.

Key

Incomplete information Pending better indoor records

Hand	Auto	Athlete	Nationality	Birthdate	Age	Location	Date	Ref
	2:02.53	Andrew Larasen	Netherlands	23 September 1970	55 years, 25 days	Madeira	18 October 2025	
	2:02:45 i	Shane Healy	Ireland	5 October 1968	55 years, 114 days	Abbotstown	27 January 2024	
	2:02:46 i	Shane Healy	Ireland	5 October 1968	55 years, 100 days	Dublin	13 January 2024	
	2:02.92	Peter Oberließen	Germany	29 December 1960	55 years, 130 days	Schwalbach am Taunus	7 May 2016	
	2:02.16	Anselm LeBourne	United States	20 April 1959	56 years, 29 days	Randalls Island	19 May 2015	
	2:03.17	Peter Oberließen	Germany	29 December 1960	54 years, 127 days	Bad Soden	5 May 2015	
	2:01.63	Anselm LeBourne	United States	20 April 1959	55 years, 51 days	New York City	10 June 2014	
	2:03.70	Stan Immelman	South Africa	14 October 1946	55 years, 48 days	Port Elizabeth	1 December 2001	
	2:04.69	Reginald Phipps	Great Britain	6 September 1942	56 years, 346 days	Sutton Coldfield	18 August 1999	
	2:05.07	Tom Roberts	Australia	27 February 1934	55 years, 155 days	Eugene	1 August 1989	
2:06.6 h		Derek Turnbull	New Zealand	5 December 1926	55 years, 163 days	Suva	17 May 1982	
	2:08.66	Frank Evans	New Zealand	7 April 1925	55 years, 279 days	Christchurch	11 January 1981	
