= Masters W85 1500 metres world record progression =

This is the progression of world record improvements of the 1500 metres W85 division of Masters athletics.

Key

Incomplete information Pending

Hand	Auto	Athlete	Nationality	Birthdate	Location	Date
	7:37.31	Yoko Nakano	Japan	1 December 1935	Tokyo	13 November 2021
	8:47.83 i	Melitta Czerwenka-Nagel	Germany	30 April 1930	Ludwigshafen	30 January 2016
	8:50.42	Melitta Czerwenka-Nagel	Germany	30 April 1930	Lyon	14 August 2015
	8:51.67	Nina Naumenko	Russia	15 June 1925	Lignano	15 September 2011
10:11.5		Gerry Davidson	United States	12 March 1921	Santa Ana	2 April 2006
	10:33.40	Ivy Granstrom	Canada	28 September 1911	Durban	26 July 1997
	10:39.20	Josephine Gregg	United States	1912	Tucson	1997
