= Masters M55 triple jump world record progression =

This is the progression of world record improvements of the triple jump M55 division of Masters athletics.

Key

Incomplete information Pending

Distance	Wind	Athlete	Nationality	Birthdate	Location	Date
14.13	0.7	Wolfgang Knabe	Germany	12 July 1959	İzmir	28 August 2014
13.87	1.1	Wolfgang Knabe	Germany	12 July 1959	Erfurt	12 July 2014
13.85	1.3	Stig Bäcklund	Finland	27 October 1939	Kajaani	2 July 1995
13.11	0.2	Horst Mandl	Austria	8 January 1936	Kristiansand	10 July 1992
12.88		Hermann Strauss	Germany	6 March 1931	Ludwigshafen	1 July 1989
12.63		Olavi Niemi	Finland	7 November 1931	Eugene	3 August 1989
12.62		Gordon Farrell	United States	24 November 1917	Van Nuys	8 January 1975
12.35	2.0	Matti Jarvinen	Finland	23 February 1926	Larvik	8 August 1981
