= Masters M75 javelin throw world record progression =

Masters M75 javelin throw world record progression is the progression of world record improvements of the javelin throw M75 division of Masters athletics. Records must be set in properly conducted, official competitions under the standing IAAF rules unless modified by World Masters Athletics. The M75 division consists of male athletes who have reached the age of 75 but have not yet reached the age of 80, so exactly from their 75th birthday to the day before their 80th birthday. The M75 division throws a 500 g implement.

Key

Incomplete information Pending

Distance	Athlete	Nationality	Birthdate	Age	Location	Date	Ref
52.15	Esa Kiuru	Finland	14 April 1947	75 years, 128 days	Mänttä-Vilppula	20 August 2022	
51.76	Esa Kiuru	Finland	14 April 1947	75 years, 100 days	Kuhmoinen	23 July 2022	
51.18	Esa Kiuru	Finland	14 April 1947	75 years, 52 days	Lappeenranta	5 June 2022	
47.12	Gary Stenlund	United States	7 August 1940	75 years, 261 days	Eugene	24 April 2016	
46.45	Paavo Niemelä	Finland	3 April 1936	75 years, 53 days	Raahe	26 May 2011	
43.77	Matti Kamila	Finland	29 July 1928	76 years, 1 day	Arhus	30 July 2004	
42.97	Veikko Javanainen	Finland	31 October 1925	75 years, 221 days	Pori	9 June 2001	
40.17	Erik Eriksson	Finland	14 August 1923	76 years, 330 days	Jyväskylä	9 July 2000	
37.39	Axel Rydström	Sweden	22 April 1925	75 years, 42 days	Lund	3 June 2000	
