= Masters M90 10000 metres world record progression =

This is the progression of world record improvements of the 10000 metres M90 division of Masters athletics.

Key

Incomplete information Pending

Hand	Auto	Athlete	Nationality	Birthdate	Age	Location	Date
	1:02:48.93	David Carr	Australia	15 June 1932	90 years, 57 days	Cannington	11 August 2022
1:02:21.5		Alfred Althaus	Germany	17 November 1903	90 years, 198 days	Athens	3 June 1994
1:09:27.5		Gordon Porteous	United Kingdom	20 February 1914	90 years, 240 days	Coatbridge	17 October 2004
	1:11:40.78	Paul Spangler	United States	18 March 1899	90 years, 133 days	Eugene	29 July 1989
