= Masters W60 5000 metres world record progression =

This is the progression of world record improvements of the 5000 metres W60 division of Masters athletics.

Key

Incomplete information Pending

Hand	Auto	Athlete	Nationality	Birthdate	Age	Location	Date
	17:50.72	Sally Gibbs	New Zealand	5 June 1963	60 years, 291 days	Christchurch	22 March 2024
	17:59.16	Silke Schmidt	Germany	7 August 1959	60 years, 44 days	Wageningen	20 September 2019 (Note: 7 August 2019 by WMA source, probably a mistake)
	18:10.40	Silke Schmidt	Germany	7 August 1959	60 years, 23 days	Utrecht	30 August 2019
	18:48.62	Lidia Zentner	Germany	27 March 1953	60 years, 153 days	Flein	27 August 2013
	18:51.13	Bernardine Portenski	New Zealand	26 August 1949	60 years, 179 days	Wellington	21 February 2010
	19:04.03	Angela Copson	Great Britain	20 April 1947	62 years, 76 days	Birmingham	5 July 2009
19:14.8		Marion Irvine	United States	19 October 1929	60 years, 0 days		19 October 1989
	20:51.63	Shirley Brasher	Australia	6 November 1926	62 years, 271 days	Eugene	4 August 1989
19:44.2		Gitte Danelund	Denmark	1920	62		1982
