= Masters M55 100 metres hurdles world record progression =

This is the progression of world record improvements of the 100 metres hurdles M55 division of Masters athletics.

Key

Incomplete information Wind aided Pending

Hand	Auto	Wind	Athlete	Nationality	Birthdate	Location	Date
	14.25	-0.4	Herbert Kreiner	Austria	22.07.1955	Nyíregyháza	22.07.2010
	14.44		Walt Butler	United States	21.03.1941	Los Angeles	30.06.1996
	14.49	1.6	Walt Butler	United States	21.03.1941	Eugene	22.08.1996
	14.77		Charles Miller	United States	28.07.1937	San Antonio	23.07.1994
	14.78		Hugh Adams	United States	1940	San Jose	10.06.1995
	15.28		Richard Hickmann	United States	1934	Eugene	03.08.1989
	15.39	-1.4	Walter Bauer	Germany	08.06.1941	Malmö	24.07.1996
	15.40		Rolf Bertram	Germany	23.04.1935	Budapest	1990
	15.53		Phil Mulkey	United States	07.01.1933	Orlando	05.08.1988
