= Masters M85 javelin throw world record progression =

Masters M85 javelin throw world record progression is the progression of world record improvements of the javelin throw M85 division of Masters athletics. Records must be set in properly conducted, official competitions under the standing IAAF rules unless modified by World Masters Athletics. The M85 division consists of male athletes who have reached the age of 85 but have not yet reached the age of 90, so exactly from their 85th birthday to the day before their 90th birthday. The M85 division throws a 400 g implement.

Key

Incomplete information Pending

Distance	Athlete	Nationality	Birthdate	Age	Location	Date	Ref
40.09 m	Jouni Tenhu	Finland	30 April 1939	85 years, 111 days	Gothenburg	19 August 2024	
39.86 m	Jouni Tenhu	Finland	30 April 1939	85 years, 67 days	Oulu	6 July 2024	
35.64 m	William Platts	United States	18 April 1928	85 years, 172 days	St. George	7 October 2013	
31.72 m	Klaus Langer	Germany	15 July 1916	86 years, 38 days	Potsdam	22 August 2002	
28.12 m	Saburo Sato	Japan	1916	85	Shimane	2002	
25.64 m	Takuro Miura	Japan	1917	85	Dalian	2002	
24.56 m	Antonio Antunes Fonseca	Brazil	18 January 1914	87 years, 175 days	Brisbane	12 July 2001	
27.34 m	Gerhard Schepe	Germany	26 August 1911	85 years, 325 days	Durban	17 July 1997	
