= Masters M70 javelin throw world record progression =

Masters M70 javelin throw world record progression is the progression of world record improvements of the javelin throw M70 division of Masters athletics. Records must be set in properly conducted, official competitions under the standing IAAF rules unless modified by World Masters Athletics. The M70 division consists of male athletes who have reached the age of 70 but have not yet reached the age of 75, so exactly from their 70th birthday to the day before their 75th birthday. The M70 division throws a 500 g implement.

Key

Incomplete information Pending

Distance	Athlete	Nationality	Birthdate	Location	Date
54.47	Esa Kiuru	Finland	14 April 1947	Orivesi	10 July 2021
53.61	Esa Kiuru	Finland	14 April 1947	Kuhmoinen	14 July 2018
53.39	Esa Kiuru	Finland	14 April 1947	Kuhmoinen	22 July 2017
53.13	Esa Kiuru	Finland	14 April 1947	Málaga	12 September 2018
53.09	Kauko Tuisku	Finland	9 August 1944	Jyväskylä	9 August 2014
52.23	Gary Stenlund	United States	7 August 1940	Sacramento	6 July 2011
51.25	Wladyslaw Kowalczyk	Germany	9 March 1937	Schweinfurt	11 July 2008
48.66	Seppo Salanto	Finland	30 April 1931	Jyväskylä	15 August 2003
48.34	Härje Noreborn	Sweden	23 November 1926	Gateshead	4 August 1999
44.09	Pavel Jilek	Czech Republic	6 January 1929	Olomouc	19 June 1999
