= Masters M75 5000 metres world record progression =

This is the progression of world record improvements of the 5000 metres M75 division of Masters athletics.

Key

Incomplete information Pending

Hand	Auto	Athlete	Nationality	Birthdate	Age	Location	Date	Ref
	18:50.07	Cees Stolwijk	Netherlands	10 January 1950	75 years, 254 days	Breda	21 September 2025	
	19:07.02	Ed Whitlock	Canada	6 March 1931	75 years, 138 days	Dieppe	22 July 2006	
19:45.5 h		Stephen Charlton	Great Britain	4 October 1926	75 years, 248 days	London	9 June 2002	
	20:00.13	James Todd	Great Britain	29 December 1921	75 years, 206 days	Durban	23 July 1997	
20:36.0 h		David Morrison	Great Britain	19 December 1913	75 years, 264 days	Coatbridge	9 September 1989	
	20:55.39	Alfred Funk	United States	24 June 1914	75 years, 38 days	Eugene	1 August 1989	
20:59.0 h		Ed Benham	United States	12 July 1907	76 years, 73 days	San Juan	23 September 1983	
21:19.0 h		Luis Rivera	Mexico	28 February 1902	75 years, 188 days	Los Angeles	4 September 1977	
21:20.2 h		Paul Spangler	United States	18 March 1899	78 years, 145 days	Gothenburg	10 August 1977	
