= Masters M80 long jump world record progression =

This is the progression of world record improvements of the long jump M80 division of Masters athletics.

Key

Incomplete information Pending Indoor mark
IAAF includes indoor marks in the record list since 2000, but WMA does not follow that practice.

Distance	Wind	Athlete	Nationality	Birthdate	Age	Location	Date	Ref
4.45	+0.3	Eberhard Linke	Germany	3 January 1944	80 years, 148 days	Kreuztal	30 May 2024	
4.39 i		Eberhard Linke	Germany	3 January 1944	80 years, 59 days	Dortmund	2 March 2024	
4.36	+0.9	Ishigami Saburo	Japan	15 August 1930	80 years, 33 days	Tokyo	17 September 2010	
4.19	-0.5	Melvin Larsen	United States	12 June 1924	80 years, 55 days	Decatur	6 August 2004	
4.19	NWI	Mazumi Morita	Japan	17 July 1913	81 years, 307 days	Tokyo	20 May 1995	
4.18	NWI	Giichi Suda	Japan	16 September 1912	82 years, 29 days	Tokyo	15 October 1994	
4.12	+0.8	Mazumi Morita	Japan	17 July 1913	80 years, 82 days	Miyazaki	7 October 1993	
3.95	NWI	Gulab Singh	India	13 October 1905	83 years, 287 days	Eugene	27 July 1989	
