= Masters M60 1500 metres world record progression =

This is the progression of world record improvements of the 1500 metres M60 division of Masters athletics.

Key

Incomplete information Pending

Hand	Auto	Athlete	Nationality	Birthdate	Age	Location	Date	Ref
	4:21.21	Andrew Ridley	Great Britain	24 July 1964	61 years, 20 days	Guildford	13 August 2025	
	4:24.00	Nolan Shaheed	United States	18 July 1949	61 years, 286 days	Cerritos	30 April 2011	
	4:27.65	Ron Robertson	New Zealand	3 June 1941	60 years, 40 days	Brisbane	13 July 2001	
	4:28.66	Derek Turnbull	New Zealand	5 December 1926	62 years, 243 days	Eugene	5 August 1989	
4:29.0 h		John Gilmour	Australia	3 May 1919	60 years, 233 days	Perth	22 December 1979	
4:31.3 h		John Gilmour	Australia	3 May 1919	60 years, 191 days	Perth	10 November 1979	
