= Masters W40 200 metres world record progression =

This is the progression of world record improvements of the 200 metres W40 division of Masters athletics.

Key

Incomplete information Wind aided Pending

Hand	Auto	Wind	Athlete	Nationality	Birthdate	Location	Date
	22.72	1.4	Merlene Ottey	Slovenia	10.05.1960	Athens	23.08.2004
	24.25	2.0	Violetta Lapierre	France	15.10.1963	Vénissieux	15.05.2004
	24.66A		Sara Montecinos	Chile	08.03.1954	Cali	19.03.1994
	24.84		Phil Raschker	United States	21.02.1947	Eugene	03.08.1989
25.1			Maeve Kyle	Ireland	06.10.1928	Belfast	10.05.1969
