= Masters M80 80 metres hurdles world record progression =

This is the progression of world record improvements of the 80 metres hurdles M80 division of Masters athletics.

Key

Incomplete information Wind aided Pending

Hand	Auto	Wind	Athlete	Nationality	Birthdate	Location	Date
	14.75	0.1	Melvin Larsen	United States	12.06.1924	San Sebastian	31.08.2005
	14.91		Juji Tanaka	Japan	18.04.1923	Nagano	15.07.2003
	16.95	0.2	Bruno Sobrero	Italy	11.11.1920	Potsdam	23.08.2002
	16.98	-0.3	Mazumi Morita	Japan	17.07.1913	Miyazaki	09.10.1993
	17.29		Karl Trei	Canada	19.03.1909	Eugene	30.07.1989
