= Masters M60 javelin throw world record progression =

Masters M60 javelin throw world record progression is the progression of world record improvements of the javelin throw M60 division of Masters athletics. Records must be set in properly conducted, official competitions under the standing IAAF rules unless modified by World Masters Athletics. The M60 division consists of male athletes who have reached the age of 60 but have not yet reached the age of 65, so exactly from their 60th birthday to the day before their 65th birthday. The M60 division throws a 600 g implement, the same specifications as the open women's javelin.

Key

Incomplete information Pending

Distance	Athlete	Nationality	Birthdate	Location	Date
62.56	Larry Stewart	United States	19.10.1937	Eagle Rock	12.06.1999
62.47	Esa Kiuru	Finland	14.04.1947	Koria	21.07.2007
62.09	Kauko Tuisku	Finland	09.08.1944	Koria	02.07.2005
60.07	Axel Jelten	Germany	06.12.1940	Potsdam	22.08.2002
57.91	Wladyslaw Kowalczyk	Germany	09.03.1937	Gateshead	04.08.1999
57.79	Alexsander Sakow	Poland	10.01.1939	Gateshead	04.08.1999
53.22	Berthold Maier	Germany	1937	Gateshead	04.08.1999
52.44	Olavi Varis	Finland	23.05.1937	Tampere	03.07.1999
