= Masters M80 high jump world record progression =

This is the progression of world record improvements of the high jump M80 division of Masters athletics.

Key

Incomplete information Pending

| Height | Athlete | Nationality | Birthdate | Location | Date |
|---|---|---|---|---|---|
| 1.37 | Richard Lowery | United States | 06.04.1931 | Houston | 17.06.2011 |
| 1.35 | Samuli Korpi | Finland | 19.08.1929 | Tampere | 02.07.2010 |
| 1.34 | Emmerich Zensch | Austria | 20.12.1919 | Traun | 20.05.2000 |
| 1.31 | Esko Kolhonen | Finland | 03.03.1914 | Kuusankoski | 16.07.1994 |
| 1.25 | Karl Trei | Canada | 19.03.1909 | Tilsonburg | 10.06.1990 |
| 1.21 | Gulab Singh | India | 13.10.1905 | Eugene | 04.08.1989 |
