= Masters M70 1500 metres world record progression =

This is the progression of world record improvements of the 1500 metres M70 division of Masters athletics.

Key

Incomplete information Pending

Hand	Auto	Athlete	Nationality	Birthdate	Location	Date
	4:52.95	Ron Robertson	New Zealand	03.06.1941	Sacramento	06.07.2011
	4:57.65	Simon Herlaar	Netherlands	28.06.1929	Valkenswaard	28.08.1999
	5:04.54	Derek Turnbull	New Zealand	05.12.1926	Durban	26.07.1997
	5:08.71	Yoshimitsu Miyauchi	Japan	20.07.1924	Kagoshima	10.10.1995
5:08.8		Benedito de Paula	Brazil	04.04.1924	San Pablo	10.09.1995
	5:09.64	Gordon McKeown	Australia	01.09.1923	Miyazaki	16.10.1993
	5:09.73	John Gilmour	Australia	03.05.1919	Eugene	05.08.1989
5:11.8		Mervyn Jenkinson	Australia	18.01.1909		06.01.1980
