= Masters W60 triple jump world record progression =

This is the progression of world record improvements of the triple jump W60 division of Masters athletics.

Key

Incomplete information Pending Wind aided

Distance	Wind	Athlete	Nationality	Birthdate	Location	Date
11.04	1.0	Akiko Oohinata	Japan	14.12.1949	Tajimi	06.06.2010
10.65		Akiko Oohinata	Japan	14.12.1949	Tokyo	09.05.2010
10.03	-0.2	Christiane Schmalbruch	Germany	08.01.1937	Durban	23.07.1997
8.83		Kirsten Hveern	Norway	26.03.1925	Hobart	10.12.1987
