= Masters M75 high jump world record progression =

This is the progression of world record improvements of the high jump M75 division of Masters athletics.

Key

Incomplete information Pending

Height	Athlete	Nationality	Birthdate	Location	Date
1.53	Dušan Prezelj	Slovenia	25.01.1949	Zagreb	2.03.2024
1.49	Carl-Erik Särndal	Sweden	17.07.1937	Lund	17.09.2013
1.47	Carl-Erik Särndal	Sweden	17.07.1937	Zittau	16.08.2012
1.44	Esko Kolhonen	Finland	03.03.1914	Eugene	04.08.1989
1.40	Kizo Kimura	Japan	11.07.1911	Akita	30.07.1988
