= Masters W75 200 metres world record progression =

World Record of W75 Division

This is the progression of world record improvements of the 200 metres W75 division of Masters athletics.

Key

Incomplete information Wind aided Pending

Hand	Auto	Wind	Athlete	Nationality	Birthdate	Age	Location	Date
	31.56	–0.7	Carol LaFayette-Boyd	Canada	17 May 1942	76 years, 115 days	Málaga	9 September 2018
	31.89	+1.5	Carol LaFayette-Boyd	Canada	17 May 1942	76 years, 88 days	Toronto	13 August 2017
	31.89	+1.7	Carol LaFayette-Boyd	Canada	17 May 1942	76 years, 80 days	Surrey	5 August 2018
	32.83	+1.1	Carol LaFayette-Boyd	Canada	17 May 1942	75 years, 24 days	Regina	10 June 2017
	33.79	+1.8	Kathy Bergen	United States	24 December 1939	75 years, 229 days	Lyon	10 August 2015
	33.86	+1.6	Christa Bortignon	Canada	29 January 1937	76 years, 123 days	Stendal	1 June 2013
	34.40	+0.9	Paula Schneiderhan	Germany	16 November 1921	75 years, 249 days	Durban	23 July 1997
	35.93		Polly Clarke	United States	17 July 1910	75 years, 45 days		31 August 1985
	36.5		Polly Clarke	United States	17 July 1910	75 years, 38 days	Indianapolis	24 August 1985
