= Masters W75 400 metres world record progression =

This is the progression of world record improvements of the 400 metres W75 division of Masters athletics.

Key

Incomplete information Pending better indoor records

Hand	Auto	Athlete	Nationality	Birthdate	Age	Location	Date	Ref
	1:17.71	Michelle Peroni-Edoh	France	7 August 1947	76 years, 50 days	Pescara	26 September 2023	
	1:15.21	Michelle Peroni-Edoh	France	7 August 1947	75 years, 321 days	Laval	24 June 2023	
	1:19.53	Christa Bortignon	Canada	29 January 1937	76 years, 205 days	Kamloops	22 August 2013	
	1:21.28 i	Jeanne Daprano	United States	16 September 1936	75 years, 182 days	Bloomington	16 March 2012	
	1:24.89 i	Emma Maria Mazzenga	Italy	1 August 1933	75 years, 236 days	Ancona	25 March 2009	
	1:25.07	Christa Bortignon	Canada	29 January 1937	75 years, 193 days	Saint John	9 August 2012	
	1:25.40	Suzi MacLeod	United States	7 December 1933	76 years, 227 days	Sacramento	22 July 2010	
	1:25.50	Audrey Lary	United States	9 May 1934	75 years, 88 days	Palo Alto	5 August 2009	
	1:26.66	Åse Nyland	Norway	4 May 1933	75 years, 105 days	Greveskogen	17 August 2008	
	1:27.70	Monica Shone	Great Britain	5 February 1926	76 years, 172 days	Hendon	27 July 2002	
	1:28.42	Paula Schneiderhan	Germany	16 November 1921	77 years, 264 days	Gateshead	7 August 1999	
	1:29.62	Polly Clarke	United States	17 July 1910	75 years, 39 days	Indianapolis	25 August 1985	
