= Masters M45 200 metres world record progression =

This is the progression of world record improvements of the 200 metres M45 division of Masters athletics.

Key

Incomplete information Wind aided Pending

Hand	Auto	Wind	Athlete	Nationality	Birthdate	Age	Location	Date
	21.65	0.0	Alexander Kosenkow	Germany	14 March 1977	45 years, 131 days	Minden	23 July 2022
	21.80	0.6	Willie Gault	United States	5 September 1960	47 years, 234 days	Los Angeles	26 April 2008
	21.91	1.3	Willie Gault	United States	5 September 1960	45 years, 257 days	Long Beach	20 May 2006
	22.13	0.1	Kevin Morning	United States	28 June 1956	46 years, 48 days	Los Gatos	15 August 2002
	22.19	2.7	Stephen Peters	United Kingdom	5 July 1953	46 years, 29 days	Gateshead	3 August 1999
	22.21	1.6	Stephen Peters	United Kingdom	5 July 1953	46 years, 29 days	Gateshead	3 August 1999
	22.30		Stan Whitley	United States	17 December 1945	46 years, 186 days	Eagle Rock	20 June 1992
	22.40		Reginald Austin	Australia	16 October 1936	46 years, 342 days	San Juan	23 September 1983
22.3			George Rhoden	Jamaica	13 December 1926	45 years, 202 days	Gresham	2 July 1972
