= Ray Kimble =

American athlete (born 1953)

Personal information
- Born: April 19, 1953 (age 73) Alameda County, California, United States

Sport
- Sport: Track and field

Ray Kimble (born April 19, 1953) is an American track and field athlete and former collegiate football player for Washington State University. His primary event is the triple jump. He is the current M40 world record holder. His M45 best is 47 cm superior to the listed world record, but has never been ratified.

== Personal life ==
Kimble grew up in California and he went to high school in Texarkana, Arkansas. He was a starting wide receiver and occasional defensive back at Washington State, graduating in 1976. There he used jumping on the track team as an excuse to avoid spring training with the football team. He retired from jumping after college and took a job teaching physical education at Barnard White Middle School in Union City, California. He returned to jumping in 1980.

More frustration, his personal best was a wind aided 17.65 m (57 ft 10 3/4 in), which if it had been legal would still rank #33 on the world all time list. At the time it would have been in the all time top ten. His legal personal best was 17.36 m (56 ft 11 1/4 in), +1.3 at the Modesto Relays and is #17 on the US all time list as of the end of 2017.

== Sporting career ==
He finished in fourth place at both the Olympics and World Championships, as that was the place he finished twice at the U.S. Olympic Trials, 1984 and 1992. In the 1984 trials, he was beaten by the future gold medalist Al Joyner, silver medalist and 1992 gold medalist Mike Conley, Sr. and future world record holder Willie Banks, in 1992 it was Conley again and silver medalist Charles Simpkins (who he had beaten in 1984). He also finished seventh in 1988.

Only the top three go to the Olympics. He suffered the same fate at the 1983 USA Outdoor Track and Field Championships, the qualifier for the first World Championships in Athletics, beaten by the same three competitors as in 1984. He did represent the United States internationally at the 1991 Pan American Games, where he finished fourth. By that time he was already 38 years old. He continued jumping in top level competition against competitors young enough to be his children well into his 40s. Held Masters World Triple Jump Record M35 & M40.

"We joke about it. At 40, there are more important things in life than the triple jump. It is just an aspect of what I do. I can look back and say I had fun. Rather than become frustrated, you just take the good with the bad. I learned that from my family a long time before I started participating in sports."
