= Masters W75 800 metres world record progression =

This is the progression of world record improvements of the 800 metres W75 division of Masters athletics.

Key

Incomplete information Pending Better indoor records

| Hand | Auto | Athlete | Nationality | Birthdate | Age | Location | Date | Ref |
|---|---|---|---|---|---|---|---|---|
| | 2:58.12 | Sarah Roberts | Great Britain | 6 October 1949 | 75 years, 211 days | Stevenage | 5 May 2025 | |
| | 2:57.32 i | Sarah Roberts | Great Britain | 6 October 1949 | 75 years, 139 days | London | 22 February 2025 | |
| | 3:07.19 | Angela Copson | Great Britain | 20 April 1947 | 75 years, 72 days | Tampere | 1 July 2022 | |
| | 3:07.35 | Jeanne Daprano | United States | 16 September 1936 | 75 years, 37 days | Moorpark | 23 October 2011 | |
| | 3:13.66 | Elfriede Hodapp | Germany | 15 June 1935 | 75 years, 17 days | Kevelaer | 2 July 2010 | |
| | 3:25.18 | Emma Maria Mazzenga | Italy | 1 August 1933 | 75 years, 51 days | Formia | 21 September 2008 | |
| | 3:28.73 | Melitta Czerwenka Nagel | Germany | 30 April 1930 | 76 years, 96 days | Aachen | 4 August 2006 | |
| | 3:31.37 | Nina Naumenko | Russia | 15 June 1925 | 75 years, 29 days | Jyväskylä | 14 July 2000 | |
| | 3:32.98 | Johanna Luther | Germany | 2 August 1913 | 75 years, 364 days | Eugene | 1 August 1989 | |
