= Masters W70 800 metres world record progression =

This is the progression of world record improvements of the 800 metres W70 division of Masters athletics.

Key

Incomplete information Pending

Hand	Auto	Athlete	Nationality	Birthdate	Age	Location	Date	Ref
	2:50.22	Alison Bourgeois	Switzerland	30 April 1953	70 years, 55 days	Laval	24 June 2023	
	2:50.66	Sabra Harvey	United States	2 March 1949	70 years, 139 days	Toronto	19 July 2019	
	2:51.49	Angela Copson	Great Britain	20 April 1947	70 years, 107 days	Aarhus	5 August 2017	
	2:59.55	Elfriede Hodapp	Germany	15 June 1935	70 years, 11 days	Löffingen	26 June 2005	
	3:04.44	Jean Horne	Canada	20 October 1932	70 years, 270 days	Richmond	17 July 2003	
	3:10.72	Nina Naumenko	Russia	15 June 1925	71 years, 41 days	Malmö	26 July 1996	
	3:14.90	Britta Tibbling	Sweden	19 March 1918	71 years, 133 days	Eugene	30 July 1989	
	3:19.03	Johanna Luther	Germany	2 August 1913	71 years, 328 days	Rome	26 June 1985	
