= Gary Stenlund =

American javelin thrower

Personal information
- Full name: Gary Michael Stenlund
- Nationality: American
- Born: August 7, 1940 (age 85) Longview, Washington
- Died: January 9, 2024 (aged 83) Battle Ground, WA

Sport
- Sport: Track and Field
- Event: Javelin throw
Medal record
Men's Athletics
Representing the United States
Pan American Games
Silver medal – second place	1967 Winnipeg	Javelin Throw

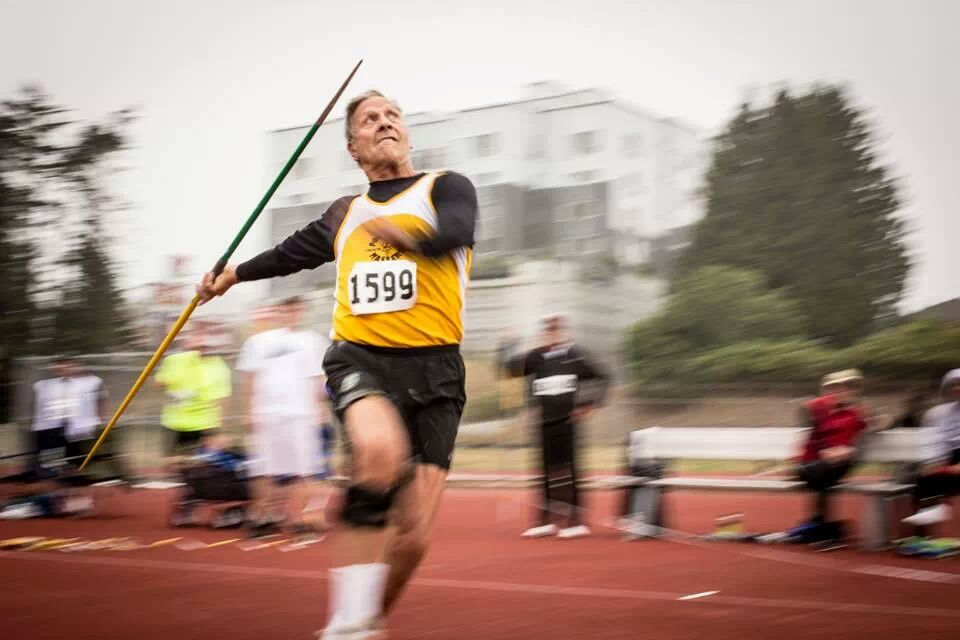
Gary Stenlund 2013

Gary Michael Stenlund (August 7, 1940 - January 9, 2024) was an American athlete. He held the Junior World Record for javelin and set many records for Oregon State. He placed second in the NCAA javelin in 1960 for Oregon State. He won second place at the Pan American Games in 1967 with a throw of 73.96m. He competed in the men's javelin throw at the 1968 Summer Olympics. Throwing for Oregon State University, he finished second at the 1960 NCAA Championships. He broke the M65 world record in the javelin with a 56.93 in the Hayward Masters Classic. He is also the former M70 world record holder, set in Sacramento, California, while winning the Masters Athletics World Championships. He broke the Master's World Record for M75 with a 47.12 meter javelin throw in 2016 at the age of 76.

Stenlund struggled with alcoholism which showed even during his participation in the Olympic Trials. He achieved sobriety in his 40's. He and a friend worked on Jantzen Beach, OR replacing stringers on houseboats. He built his own houseboat prior to this. Later in life he moved to Costa Rica where he competed in the javelin in Panama and threw regularly at a local field. He was the co-owner and worker of his own coffee farm. He returned to Washington and continued with javelin, competing and setting records into his 70's. He never stopped practicing the javelin.
