= Masters M50 800 metres world record progression =

Progression of world record improvements

This is the progression of world record improvements of the 800 metres M50 division of Masters athletics.

Key

Incomplete information Pending

Hand,	Auto	Athlete	Nationality	Birthdate	Age	Location	Date	Ref
	1:56.33	Zac Ashkanasy	Australia	10 July 1973	52 years, 194 days	Doncaster, Australia	20 January 2026	
	1:57.98	Brian Tullis	United States	27 September 1973	50 years, 325 days	Gothenburg	17 August 2024	
	1:58.07	Brian Tullis	United States	27 September 1973	50 years, 297 days	Sacramento	20 July 2024	
	1:58.65	Nolan Shaheed	United States	18 July 1949	50 years, 300 days	Eagle Rock	13 May 2000	
	1:59.45	Ronald Mercelina	Netherlands	18 April 1946	50 years, 59 days	Barendrecht	16 June 1996	
	2:00.40	Alan Bradford	Australia	31 January 1939	50 years, 182 days	Eugene	1 August 1989	
2:01.1 h		Bill Fitzgerald	United States	20 May 1925	50 years, 40 days	Eagle Rock	29 June 1975	
2:05.1 h		William Sheppard	Australia	5 June 1922	50 years, 81 days	Brisbane	25 August 1972	
