= Masters W55 javelin world record progression =

Masters W55 javelin world record progression is the progression of world record improvements of the javelin throw W55 division of Masters athletics. Records must be set in properly conducted, official competitions under the standing IAAF rules unless modified by World Masters Athletics. The W55 division consists of female athletes who have reached the age of 55 but have not yet reached the age of 60, so exactly from their 55th birthday to the day before their 60th birthday. The W55 division throws a 500 g implement.

Key

Incomplete information Pending

Distance	Athlete	Nationality	Birthdate	Location	Date
44.44	Nataša Bezjak Urbančič	Slovenia	25.11.1945	Potsdam	21.08.2002
43.63	Renate Vogel	Germany	26.11.1943	Winsen	25.06.2000
33.18	Karin Illgen	Germany	07.04.1941	Gateshead	29.07.1999
