= Masters W60 long jump world record progression =

This is the progression of world record improvements of the long jump W60 division of Masters athletics.

Key

Incomplete information Pending

Distance	Wind	Athlete	Nationality	Birthdate	Age	Location	Date	Ref
4.97 m i		Petra Bajeat	France	6 March 1966	60 years, 21 days	Toruń	27 March 2026	
4.89 m	(−0.4 m/s)	Neringa Jakstiene	United States	18 October 1963	60 years, 274 days	Sacramento	18 July 2024	
4.75 m	(±0.0 m/s)	Christiane Schmalbruch	Germany	8 January 1937	60 years, 192 days	Durban	19 July 1997	
4.44 m	NWI	Paula Schneiderhan	Germany	16 November 1921	60 years, 274 days	Ahlen	29 August 1982	
