= Masters W55 300 metres hurdles world record progression =

This is the progression of world record improvements of the 300 metres hurdles W55 division of Masters athletics.

Key

Incomplete information Pending

Hand	Auto	Athlete	Nationality	Birthdate	Age	Location	Date
	46.74	Barbara Gähling	Germany	20 January 1965	57 years, 108 days	Köln	8 May 2022
	47.46	Barbara Gähling	Germany	20 January 1965	56 years, 143 days	Solingen	12 June 2021
	48.74	Susan Frisby	United Kingdom	9 April 1960	57 years, 116 days	Aarhus	3 August 2017
	49.00	Jane Horder	United Kingdom	18 January 1957	55 years, 185 days	Derby	21 July 2012
	49.14	Phil Raschker	United States	21 February 1947	55 years, 171 days	Orono	11 August 2002
	52.11	Corrie Roovers	Netherlands	14 July 1935	56 years, 12 days	Turku	26 July 1991
	55.40	Wanda Sakata Dos Santos	Brazil	1 June 1932	57 years, 63 days	Eugene	3 August 1989
