= Masters M85 80 metres hurdles world record progression =

This is the progression of world record improvements of the 80 metres hurdles M85 division of Masters athletics.

Key

Incomplete information Wind aided Pending

Hand	Auto	Wind	Athlete	Nationality	Birthdate	Location	Date
	17.33	-0.1	Anthony Bowman	United Kingdom	2 September 1935	Stretford	8 June 2021
	18.06		Kizo Kimura	Japan	11 July 1911	Wakayama	18 August 1996
	18.27	0.7	Hugo Delgado	Peru	9 June 1924	Lahti	28 July 2009
	18.91	0.5	Horst Albrecht	Germany	14 July 1923	Ljubljana	24 July 2008
	19.46		Albert Morrow	United States	2 November 1912	Long Beach	9 May 1998
	19.82	1.1	Vittorio Colo	Italy	9 November 1911	Durban	27 July 1997
20.3			Karl Trei	Canada	19 March 1909	Raleigh	7 May 1994
