= Masters M40 triple jump world record progression =

This is the progression of world record improvements of the triple jump M40 division of Masters athletics.

Key

Incomplete information Pending

Measure	Wind	Athlete	Nationality	Birthdate	Location	Date
17.32	+1.1	Fabrizio Donato	Italy	14.08.1976	Pierre-Bénite	09.06.2017
16.58	2.0	Ray Kimble	United States	19.04.1953	Edinburgh	02.07.1993
15.70		Milan Tiff	United States	05.07.1949	Eugene	01.08.1989
15.06		Michael Sauer	Germany	27.08.1941		16.05.1982
14.91		Dany Nestoret	France	20.03.1940	Sevran	15.06.1980
14.84	1.0	Kristen Flogstad	Norway	11.04.1947	Tonsberg	13.05.1989
14.63	1.0	Sean Power	United Kingdom	20.03.1943	Portsmouth	10.05.1986
14.62		Horst Mandl	Austria	08.01.1936	Zagreb	06.06.1976
14.41		Hermann Strauss	Germany	06.03.1931		16.05.1971

== See also ==
- World records in masters athletics - Triple jump
