= Masters M70 5000 metres world record progression =

This is the progression of world record improvements of the 5000 metres M70 division of Masters athletics.

Key

Incomplete information Pending

| Hand | Auto | Athlete | Nationality | Birthdate | Location | Date |
|---|---|---|---|---|---|---|
| | 18:15.53 | Ron Robertson | New Zealand | 03.06.1941 | Sacramento | 06.07.2011 |
| | 18:33.38 | Ed Whitlock | Canada | 06.03.1931 | Brisbane | 06.07.2001 |
| | 18:34.61 | Derek Turnbull | New Zealand | 05.12.1926 | Durban | 23.07.1997 |
| | 18:43.61 | Warren Utes | United States | 25.06.1920 | Turku | 23.07.1991 |
| | 18:46.62 | John Gilmour | Australia | 03.05.1919 | Eugene | 01.08.1989 |
| | 19:07.68 | Theodor Saxe | Germany | 31.12.1916 | Eggenfelden | 09.07.1988 |
| 19:33.0 | | John Farrell | United Kingdom | 12.06 1909 | Crystal Palace | 20.06.1979 |
| 19:59.3 | | Einar Nordin | Sweden | 03.07.1906 | Gothenburg | 12.08.1977 |
