= Masters W50 triple jump world record progression =

This is the progression of world record improvements of the triple jump W50 division of Masters athletics.

Key

Incomplete information Pending Wind aided better indoor record

Distance	Wind	Athlete	Nationality	Birthdate	Age	Location	Date	Ref
11.69 i		Andrea Szirbucz	Hungary	7 May 1972	50 years, 327 days	Toruń	30 March 2023	
11.66	NWI	Akiko Oohinata	Japan	14 December 1949	54 years, 238 days	Shikishima	8 August 2004	
11.58	0.2	Akiko Oohinata	Japan	14 December 1949	54 years, 333 days	Kagoshima	11 November 2004	
11.37	1.6	Anna Wlodarczyk	Poland	24 March 1951	50 years, 108 days	Brisbane	10 July 2001	
10.95 i		Danielle Desmier	France	27 July 1949	50 years, 194 days	Orléans	6 February 2000	
10.64	NWI	Kimiko Nakamura	Japan	7 December 1937	53 years, 330 days		2 November 1991	
9.68	NWI	Elżbieta Krzesińska	Poland	11 November 1934	54 years, 263 days	Eugene	1 August 1989	
