= Masters W40 80 metres hurdles world record progression =

World record progress

This is the progression of world record improvements of the 80 metres hurdles W40 division of Masters athletics.

Key

Incomplete information Wind aided Pending

| Hand | Auto | Wind | Athlete | Nationality | Birthdate | Age | Location | Date | Ref |
|---|---|---|---|---|---|---|---|---|---|
| | 11.24 | +1.2 | Olutoyin Augustus | Nigeria | 24 December 1979 | 59 years, 66 days | Sacramento | 19 July 2024 | |
| | 11.23 | -0.3 | Monica Pellegrinelli | Switzerland | 14 May 1965 | 41 years, 118 days | Bellinzona | 9 September 2006 | |
| | 11.24 | +0.1 | Monica Pellegrinelli | Switzerland | 14 May 1965 | 40 years, 109 days | San Sebastián | 31 August 2005 | |
| | 11.25 | 0.9 | Leslie Estwick | Canada | 20.12.1960 | | Brisbane | 12.07.2001 | |
| | 11.55 | 2.8 | Jocelyn Harwood | United Kingdom | 21.11.1957 | | Gateshead | 08.08.1999 | |
| | 11.68 | -0.1 | Jocelyn Harwood | United Kingdom | 21.11.1957 | | Hexham | 17.05.1998 | |
| | 11.66 | 1.4 | Christine Müller | Switzerland | 22.07.1958 | | Cesenatico | 16.09.1998 | |
| | 11.78A | -0.3 | Deby LaPlante Sweezey | United States | 1953 | | Provo | 12.08.1993 | |
| | 11.78 | 0.5 | Judy Vernon | United Kingdom | 25.09.1945 | | Malmö | 01.08.1986 | |
