= Masters W65 400 metres world record progression =

This is the progression of world record improvements of the 400 metres W65 division of Masters athletics.

Key

Incomplete information Pending Better indoor records

Hand	Auto	Athlete	Nationality	Birthdate	Age	Location	Date	Ref
	1:06.94 i	Edel Maguire	Ireland	1959	66	Gainesville	30 March 2025	
	1:07.23	Elizabeth Deak	United States	24 February 1958	65 years, 147 days	Greensboro	21 July 2023	
	1:08.08	Karla Del Grande	Canada	27 March 1953	66 years, 107 days	Toronto	12 July 2019	
	1:08.21	Diane Palmason	Canada	15 March 1938	65 years, 146 days	Eugene	8 August 2003	
	1:11.45	Carolyn Sue Cappetta	United States	1936	65	Brisbane	13 July 2001	
	1:13.71	Anna Mangler	Germany	14 January 1923	66 years, 203 days	Eugene	5 August 1989	
	1:14.31	Paula Schneiderhan	Germany	16 November 1921	66 years, 19 days	Melbourne	5 December 1987	
1:16.7 h		Winifred Audrey Reid	South Africa	1915	68	Germiston	19 May 1984	
