= Masters M40 110 metres hurdles world record progression =

This is the progression of world record improvements of the 110 metres hurdles M40 division of Masters athletics.

Key

Incomplete information Wind aided Pending

Hand	Auto	Wind	Athlete	Nationality	Birthdate	Location	Date
	13.73	-0.5	David Ashford	United States	24.01.1963	Carolina	11.07.2003
	13.96	0.0	Karl Smith	Jamaica	15.09.1959	Brisbane	12.07.2001
	14.16	0.7	Carlos Sala Molera	Spain	20.03.1960	Castellon	15.08.2000
	14.24		Stan Druckrey	United States	10.08.1948	Eugene	30.07.1989
	14.37	0.4	Herbert Kreiner	Austria	22.07.1955	Wels	31.08.1996
	14.55A	-0.5	Colin Williams	United States	14.02.1953	Provo	11.08.1993
	14.60		Walt Butler	United States	21.03.1941	Long Beach	27.07.1985
	14.63	0.0	Richard Katus	Poland	29.03.1947	Eugene	03.08.1989
14.4			Don Findlay	United Kingdom	27.05.1909	White City	01.08.1949
14.7		1.3	Leopold Marien	Belgium	22.03.1934	Toronto	13.07.1975
