= Masters W65 800 metres world record progression =

This is the progression of world record improvements of the 800 metres W65 division of Masters athletics.

Key

Incomplete information Pending

Hand	Auto	Athlete	Nationality	Birthdate	Age	Location	Date	Ref
	2:38.05	Nancy Simmonds	United States	12 July 1959	66 years, 99 days	Montecito	19 October 2025	
	2:39.61	Sabra Harvey	United States	2 March 1949	67 years, 243 days	Perth	31 October 2016	
	2:41.81	Diane Palmason	Canada	15 March 1938	65 years, 148 days	Eugene	10 August 2003	
	2:44.43	Jeanne Daprano	United States	16 September 1936	65 years, 328 days	Orono	10 August 2002	
2:46.3 h		Carolyn Sue Cappetta	United States	1936		Dorchester	24 June 2001	
	2:51.41	Jean Horne	Canada	20 October 1932	66 years, 287 days	Gateshead	3 August 1999	
2:54.5 h		Toni Borthwick	Great Britain	24 August 1930	65 years, 339 days	Hemel Hempstead	28 July 1996	
	3:01.18	Shirley Brasher	Australia	6 November 1926	65 years, 165 days		19 April 1992	
	3:03.10	Anna Mangler	Germany	14 January 1923	66 years, 197 days	Eugene	30 July 1989	
	3:06.82	Britta Tibbling	Sweden	19 March 1918	66 years, 139 days	Kvarnsveden	5 August 1984	
