= Masters W45 high jump world record progression =

High jump records

This is the progression of world record improvements of the high jump W45 division of Masters athletics.

Key

Incomplete information Pending

Height	Athlete	Nationality	Birthdate	Location	Date
1.76	Debbie Brill	Canada	10.03.1953	Gateshead	06.08.1999
1.62	Alena Plischke	Austria	29.04.1948	Stuttgart	04.07.1993
1.55	Joanna Meryl Smallwood	United Kingdom	12.11.1943	Eugene	04.08.1989
1.55	Christel Häuser	Germany	12.06.1943	Eugene	04.08.1989
1.52	Dorothy Tyler	United Kingdom	14.03.1920	London	18.07.1965
