= Marion Irvine =

American nun and former marathon runner (1929–2025)

Personal information
- Born: October 19, 1929 San Francisco, California, U.S.
- Died: August 30, 2025 (aged 95) San Rafael, California, U.S.

Sport
- Country: United States
- Retired: 1993

Marion Irvine (October 19, 1929 – August 30, 2025) was an American nun and marathon runner. Irvine became the then-oldest person to participate in the United States Olympic Trials in track and field in 1984, when she was 54 years old. Following the Trials, she regularly ran on the marathon circuit and gained attention from the media, along with the nickname "The Flying Nun". Irvine broke numerous age-group records in distance running events during her career, and has been inducted into multiple running halls of fame.

== Early life and work career ==
Irvine was born on October 19, 1929, in San Francisco, California. Her father, Walter Irvine, operated a grocery store. Irvine's mother, Mabel (Keane) Irine, was a homemaker. At St. Rose Academy, she became interested in becoming a nun; in 2007, Irvine said that she "fell in love with the life" at St. Rose. Under the name Sister Bonaventure, Irvine became a nun in the Dominican Order. At Dominican College, she received a biology degree; afterward she became a high school teacher. Irvine spent approximately 50 years as a teacher and school administrator in California, and worked for the Dominican Sisters in the role of supervisor of the organization's schools for six years.

== Running career ==
Prior to the time that she started to run, Irvine did not regularly exercise. After a brief period in which she took up swimming, Irvine began jogging in 1978. She did so on the recommendation of a niece, who was concerned about Irvine's condition physically. Overweight and a heavy smoker, her first attempt to run was on Memorial Day in 1978. Unable to complete the planned two-mile run and gasping for breath, she decided to walk. That evening, she pledged to do better the next day. Later, while on a religious retreat, Irvine was able to cover her planned distance of two miles in a session. Her initial strategy was to alternate between walking and running, depending on the availability of shade. Within four months of starting to run, she was posting times of seven minutes per mile in her two-mile runs, and soon she started entering five-kilometer and 10-kilometer races. Irvine's first race at a longer distance was a 15-kilometer run at a park; she posted the second-fastest time among the women who took part. In 1980, she joined her niece in running at the Avenue of the Giants Marathon, posting a time of 3:01. Irvine then started to regularly take part in marathons, at the rate of four per year. In addition, she hired a coach in 1982. In the previous year, Irvine had run in the Boston Marathon, winning the women's 50–59 age group in a time of 3:11.00.

Many records for female runners over 50 years old were set by Irvine. She was the first woman in her age group to run for under 20 minutes in the 5-kilometer run, 38 minutes in the 10-km, and 3:00 in the marathon. In 1983, Irvine competed in the California International Marathon, held in Sacramento, California. Her time of 2:51.01 set a world record for female runners over 50; it was over eight seconds faster than the previous record time, which she held, and about 13 minutes ahead of the next-fastest time by an over-50 woman. The time also bettered the 2:51.16 that was required to participate in the United States Olympic Trials. At the time, Irvine was the oldest competitor ever in a U.S. track and field Olympic Trials; by the time of the Trials, she was 54 years old. In the 1984 Trials, which qualified runners for the inaugural Olympic women's marathon, Irvine posted a time of 2:52.02, and was not one of the qualifiers. Of the 268 women who ran at the Trials, she ended up in 131st place. Regarding the experience, Irvine said, "I knew the trials would be my Olympics."

Nicknamed "The Flying Nun", Irvine gained recognition from her U.S. Olympic Trials run. She made appearances on the television programs Good Morning America, The Phil Donahue Show, and Today, and received profiles from major American magazines. Irvine continued her running career and gained a sponsorship from Nike, Inc. With her travel costs covered by Nike, she entered marathons in Europe as well as the U.S., and occasionally took part in track events. In one event held in Europe, the 1985 World Veterans Games in Rome, Italy, Irvine earned four medals: one gold and three silver. As Irvine grew older, she broke further age-group records for 55–59- and 60–64-year-old female runners. At the 1989 World Veterans Games, she won five gold medals. In the fall of 1989, Irvine broke her right leg while training, forcing her into an extended break from running.

In 1993, Irvine ran her final competitive race. She ran in a half marathon, but her time of 1:59.53 was approximately half an hour slower than she anticipated. Following the race, she retired from competition. Although Irvine no longer ran a competitive schedule, she continued to train for running, at a reduced rate, and took up other sports, including rowing. She often rowed indoors with an ergometer.

== Later years and legacy ==
Irvine spent the years after the end of her running career campaigning for social issues, and credited her attendance at the 1999 World Trade Organization protests as the driving factor behind her involvement. She was a critic of the death penalty and befriended a death row inmate at San Quentin prison, saying, "The state has no business executing anyone for anything," adding that matters of life and death were "God's domain." Irvine's activism extended to opposing globalization and the Iraq War.

During her career, Irvine was recognized as the leading runner in her age group eight times between 1981 and 1992. Irvine gained induction into the Road Runners Club of America Hall of Fame in 1994. In addition, she is in the USATF Masters Hall of Fame. Irvine is featured in the 1987 Oscar-nominated documentary film, Silver into Gold.

In a 2010 interview, Irvine said that her love of running was consistent with her duties as a nun: "God expects us to live our lives to the fullest and if I was meant to be an athlete, I guess I should work at it." Enjoying other aspects of living a happy life, Irvine once surprised a flight attendant, ordering a vodka and cranberry drink while on a flight from Boston to San Francisco, saying, "Honey, I'm a nun, not a saint,"

Irvine died August 30, 2025, at the age of 95.

== Bibliography ==
- Bergquist, Lee (2009). "A Champion Again". Second Wind. Human Kinetics 1. ISBN 9780736074919.
- Kislevitz, Gail (1999). First Marathons: Personal Encounters With the 26.2-Mile Monster. Breakaway Books. ISBN 9781891369117.
- Lin, Jennifer; Warner, Susan (2009). "Sister Marion Irvine: The Flying Nun". Sole Sisters: Stories of Women and Running. Andrews McMeel Publishing. ISBN 9780740786976.
