= Ivy Granstrom =

Canadian Masters athlete

Ivy Granstrom (September 28, 1911 – April 14, 2004) was a blind Canadian Masters athlete. She is the current world record holder for the W85 3000 metres and 10000 metres. The accommodation to allow her to be guided through her open competitions set the rules for such competitions where she ran tethered to a guide, Paul Hoeberigs, but it was clear she was exerting the effort (as opposed to a dog being pulled by their leash).

With failing eyesight since childhood, she hid her failing eyesight and trained as a nursing aid with the Red Cross during World War II until her condition was discovered. She had worked since age 12 cooking for miners in Fernie, British Columbia. At age 60 she experienced a serious back injury in a car accident. He doctors told her to expect to be in a wheelchair the rest of her life, to which she muttered an expletive. She took up walking, jogging and advanced to competition for the blind. She started masters competition at age 68. But she had always been athletic. She participated in the English Bay Polar bear plunge for 76 years and was known as "Queen of the Polar Bear Swims."

She won numerous medals at the Masters Athletics World Championships and World Masters Games. In addition to her world records, many other records continue as Canadian masters records. She was the British Columbia athlete of the year in 1982.

She was a 2001 inductee into the Terry Fox Hall of Fame a 1988 appointee to the Order of Canada, is a member of the British Columbia Sports Hall of Fame, the Canadian Disability Hall of Fame, and the Canadian Masters Athletics Hall of Fame.
