= Wolfgang Knabe =

German triple jumper (born 1959)

Wolfgang Knabe (born 12 July 1959) is a West German triple jumper.

He finished eighth at the 1981 European Indoor Championships and competed at the 1983 World Championships without reaching the final.

His personal best jump was 17.12 metres, achieved in September 1988 in Düsseldorf. This result places him ninth on the German all-time performers list, behind Ralf Jaros, Charles Friedek, Volker Mai, Dirk Gamlin, Peter Bouschen, Wolfgang Zinser, Jörg Drehmel and Jörg Elbe.

He became West German champion in 1988, representing the sports clubs SV Union Groß-Ilsede and TV Wattenscheid. He also won an array of silver and bronze medals between 1983 and 1994, and became West German indoor champion in 1986.

He has continued to jump into the Masters athletics age groups. He is the current world record holder in the M45 and M50 age divisions.
