= Paul Spangler =

Dr. Paul E. Spangler (March 18, 1899 – March 29, 1994) was a retired U.S. Navy surgeon, who took up the sport of running at the age of 67. Spangler business career and athletic career were both very successful.

== Early life ==
Spangler was born on March 18, 1899, in Oregon. He graduated from the University of Oregon and the Harvard Medical School. He joined the Navy for World War II. He was Chief of Surgery at the naval hospital near Pearl Harbor on December 7, 1941. He retired from the Navy in 1959, then joined the charitable hospital ship SS Hope as its chief medical officer. He later moved to San Luis Obispo, California, and took the job as Chief Surgeon at the nearby California Men's Colony prison which he held for ten years until he "was retired" in 1969 "because he was too old."

== Running career ==
Spangler was chairman of his chapter of the American Heart Association. As a result of this, he felt that merely being a weekend athlete was not adequate to stave off heart disease.

Running has meant everything to me. My only mission in life now is to convince people this is possible. With proper living, they can eliminate coronary heart disease.

Spangler was well into his running program in 1975 when the Corona Del Mar Track Club held a meet in San Luis Obispo. He entered the mile, 2 mile and 3 mile. After running the mile he went home to rest. When he returned to the track, he was informed he had broken the world record. And "the bug hit him."

In his late 70s his training schedule was a ten mile run at 5:30 a.m., six days a week.

Spangler currently holds the American record for 90-year-olds in every metric distance race between 800 metres and 10,000 metres, including the 5,000 metre racewalk, with all records set in 1989 He also holds the 85-year-old record for 3,000 metres. He completed the New York Marathon later in 1989 and continued to train with the goal of competing at age 100.

In his 28 year running career, Spangler claimed 85 national age group records at various distances. He was a pioneer into the limits of Senior athletics by frequently being the oldest competitor. paving the way for successors into the upper age brackets.

He died shortly after turning 95 while doing one of his regular 7 mile training runs.

That's the way to go! Doing what he loved most.

— Hal Higdon

== Honors ==
50 Plus Fitness, now called the Lifelong Fitness Alliance, a Senior Heath organization, hosts an annual 8 kilometre run for Seniors at Stanford University named in Spangler's honor.

USA Track & Field (USATF) named its annual award for the outstanding Masters Long Distance Running athlete after Spangler.

Spangler was USATF "Age Group" winner seven times (1993, 1991, 1990, 1989, 1986, 1985, and 1982).

Spangler was elected into the USATF Masters Hall of Fame in its second year, 1997.
