= Derek Turnbull =

New Zealand runner (1926–2006)

Derek Turnbull QSM
Personal information
- Born: Derek Philip Fraser Turnbull; 5 December 1926 Waikaka, New Zealand
- Died: 2 November 2006 (aged 79)
- Education: Southland Boys' High School; Massey Agricultural College
- Occupation: Farmer

Sport
- Country: New Zealand
- Sport: Masters athletics
- Event: 1500 m to marathon

Derek Philip Fraser Turnbull QSM (5 December 1926 – 2 November 2006) was a New Zealand middle- and long-distance runner. He took up Masters athletics at the age of 40, and went on to set 25 Masters Athletics World Records.

== Early life ==
Born in Waikaka, Southland, 28 km northeast of Gore, on 5 December 1926, Turnbull was educated at Southland Boys' High School. He went on to study at Massey Agricultural College, gaining a Diploma of Agriculture with honours. He became a farmer, and owned and farmed 105 hectares at Tussock Creek, 30 km north of Invercargill from about 1980.

== Athletics ==
While at Massey, Turnbull was awarded New Zealand University blues in cross country and athletics. He began competing in Masters athletics events when he was 40 years old, going on to win 28 gold medals at world veteran track and field championships.

Over his career, Turnbull set 25 Masters Athletics World Records across various age categories and events. In 1992, he set six world records in the 65–69 age category as well as two further world best times for the year. As of 2025, records set by Turnbull that still stand are:

Event	Age group	Record	Date	Place	Meet
Mile	M 65	4:56.4	29 February 1992	Christchurch	
3000 m	M 65	9:47.4	8 February 1992	Christchurch	
10,000 m	M 65	34:42.2	15 March 1992	Christchurch	
Marathon	M 65	2:41:57	12 April 1992	London	London Marathon

Three of Turnbull's notable marathons include:

- 1987 Adelaide Marathon, winning the men's 60+ category in a time of 2:38:46, his personal best for the distance
- 1990 New York Marathon, winning the men's 60-69 category in a time of 2:41:21
- 1992 London Marathon, winning the M 65 category in 2:41:57.

In the 1988 Queen's Birthday Honours, Turnbull was awarded the Queen's Service Medal for community service. His story was documented in the book The Fastest Old Man in the World by Vince Boyle, published in 2006, and later made into a 30-minute film of the same name.

== Later life and death ==
Turnbull suffered a mild stroke in 2001. He died on 2 November 2006, and was survived by his wife, Pat, with whom he had six children.
