= Athletics abbreviations =

Glossary of abbreviations and symbols used in athletics

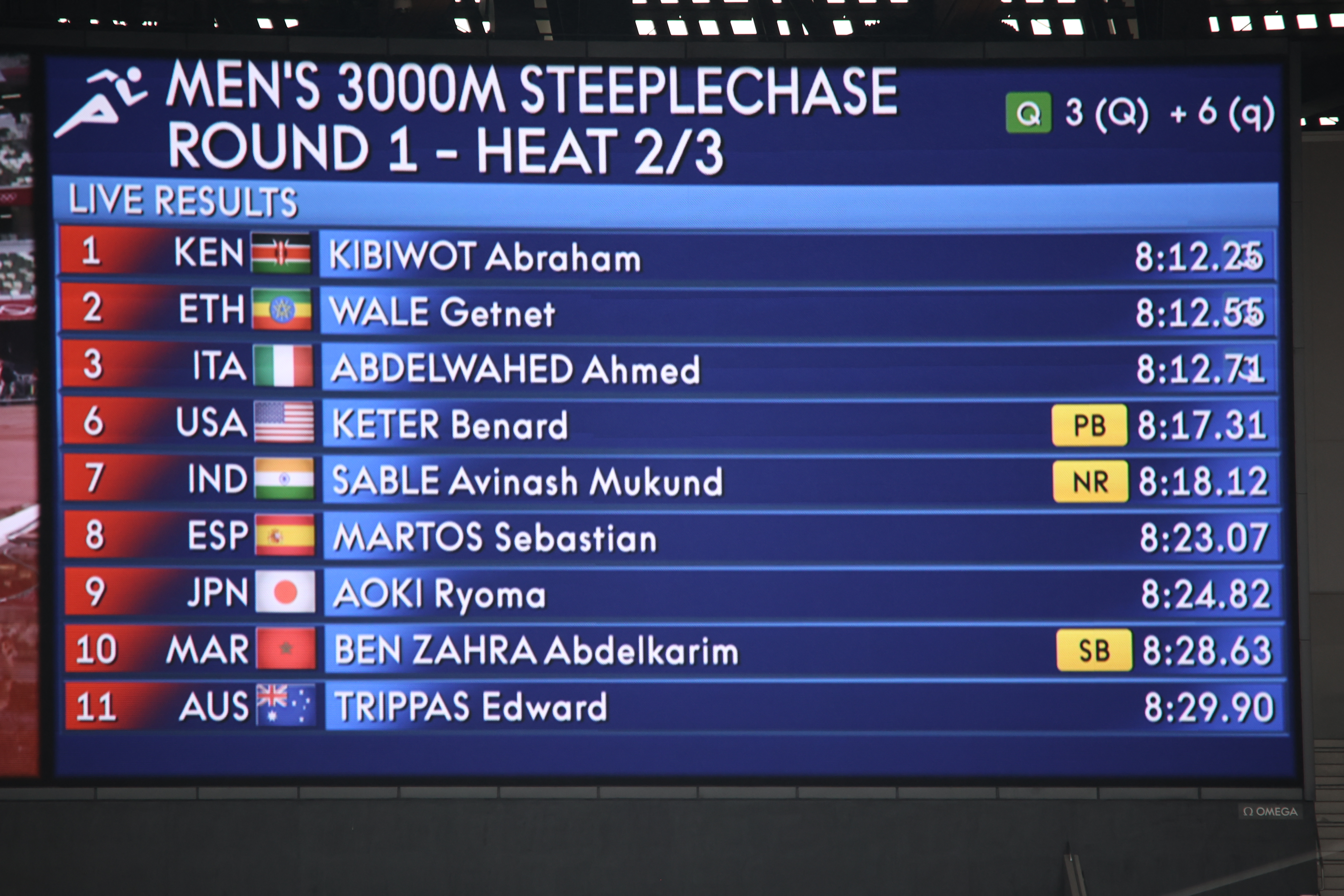
A scoreboard displaying results for a heat of the men's 3000 metres steeplechase at the 2020 Summer Olympics.

The sport of athletics, including track and field, road running, cross country running and race walking, uses abbreviations for events, performances, records and competition results. Terminology varies between governing bodies, statistical publications and historical periods. World Athletics publishes standard terms and abbreviations for international competition results. Additional statistical notation is also used in athletics publications such as Track & Field News.

== Times and marks ==
Race times may be measured by fully automatic time (FAT), hand timing or, in some road races, an approved transponder timing system. Fully automatic track times are normally reported to hundredths of a second; hand times are recorded to tenths of a second. A hand-recorded time is not equivalent to an automatically recorded time of the same numerical value. Some statistical publications convert hand times to estimated automatic-timing equivalents for comparison, using event-dependent corrections; these estimates are not themselves official electronically recorded times.

Times are conventionally written with colons between hours, minutes and seconds, and a decimal point before fractions of a second; for example, 2:04:55 for a marathon or 1:41.73 for an 800 metres race. In road racing, published results may distinguish an athlete's elapsed net or chip time from the gun time measured from the starting signal. The relevant competition and record rules determine which time is official.

When a photo finish is required to separate competitors whose displayed times are equal to the hundredth, officials may examine thousandths of a second to determine their order. The recorded results are nevertheless published according to the precision specified by the rules.

Historical notation: older result lists may distinguish hand timing with h or ht, and a converted time with c. These notations should be interpreted in the context of the source using them.

=== Records ===
Athletics records may require ratification by the governing body responsible for the record; world records are ratified by World Athletics. A performance may be described as pending ratification until that process is complete. Record abbreviations can vary by jurisdiction and competition, and some codes have more than one meaning depending on context.

- WR – world record
- OR – Olympic record
- CR – championship record; also course record or collegiate record in other contexts. When followed by a rule number (such as CR6.1), it means competition rule, not championship record
- GR – games record
- PR – Paralympic record in Paralympic competition; personal record in some other statistical publications
- AR – area (or continental) record
- ER – European record
- NR – national record (for a specific country)
- MR – meeting record (also called a meet record)
- DLR – Diamond League record
- U20 – under-20 age category (formerly junior or J); athletes must be under 20 on 31 December of the competition year
  - WU20R – world under-20 record (formerly WJR – world junior record)
  - AU20R – area (or continental) under-20 record (formerly AJR – area junior record)
  - NU20R – national under-20 record (for a specific country) (formerly NJR – national junior record)
- # – a record has not been accepted, or an irregularity has been noted in the result
- X – the athlete was disqualified after the performance (distinct from lowercase x for a failed field-event trial)

=== Bests ===
A best is used for performances where an official record is not recognised for the event or age category, or for other statistical comparisons. It is distinct from a recognised record. Road events such as the marathon have been eligible for official world records since 2004, so a marathon performance should not automatically be described as only a world best.

- WB – world best (the best mark recorded for a non-WA world record event)
- WBP – world best performance (a leading mark in an event without an officially recognised world record)
- AB – area (or continental) best (the best mark recorded for a non-WA world record event)
- NB – national best (the best mark recorded for a non-national federation record event)
- NBP – national best performance (a leading national mark in an event without an officially recognised record)
- PB – personal best (an athlete's best valid performance in an event)
- SB – season's best (an athlete's best performance in an event during a season)
- WL – world leading (the best mark achieved worldwide within a given season)
- EL – European lead (the best performance recorded in Europe during a season)
- CL – collegiate-leading performance in a season (in some collegiate statistical publications)
- U18 – under-18 age category (formerly youth or Y); athletes must be under 18 on 31 December of the competition year
  - WU18B – world under-18 best (formerly WYB – world youth best)
  - AU18B – area (or continental) under-18 best (formerly AYB – area youth best)
  - NU18B – national under-18 best (for a specific country) (formerly NYB – national youth best)
- U23 – under-23 age category; athletes must be under 23 on 31 December of the competition year
  - WU23B – world under-23 best
  - AU23B – area (or continental) under-23 best
  - NU23B – national under-23 best (for a specific country)

=== Circumstances and conditions ===
- + – time was taken at an intermediate distance in a longer race
- A – performance at altitude, generally above 1,000 m in World Athletics statistical notation
- a – assisted road-race performance, such as one achieved on a course ineligible for record purposes under applicable rules
- AC – also competed
- b – banked track
- c – converted mark
- dh – downhill
- e – exhibition performance in World Athletics notation (other statistical publications may use it differently)
- F – final (a stage of competition)
- DNF – did not finish (running or race walking event)
- DNS – did not start
- r – retired from competition (field events)
- DNC – did not compete (used in some results publications)
- DQ – disqualified
- YC – yellow card
- YRC – second yellow card, with a red card as a consequence
- RC – red card
- h – hand timed or heats
- i – indoors
- INT – international team (used in relay results where athletes are from different countries)
- IRM – invalid results mark, a category covering outcomes such as DNS, DNF, DQ and NM
- L – lane infringement
- mx – mixed-gender race
- n – non-winning time
- ND – no distance (used in some results publications)
- NT – no time (used in some results publications)
- UNC – uncertified performance, including certain road-race results without an accepted course measurement or other required certification
- RT – reaction time, usually measured from the start signal to the athlete's response at the starting blocks
- DOB – date of birth
- YOB – year of birth
- NWI – no wind information (or no wind instrument)
- NWJ – no water jump (in steeplechase running events)
- OC – out of competition athlete (athlete representing a foreign member federation in a national championship)
- OT – oversized track
- P – competing under protest in competition results (not to be confused with an unratified record)
- Q – qualified by place in a track event or by achieving the qualifying standard in a field event (see qualifying standards in athletics)
- q – qualified by time in a track event, or by performance without achieving the automatic qualifying standard in a field event
- qR – advanced to next round by referee
- qJ – advanced to next round by jury of appeal
- qD – advanced to next round by draw
- Re – qualified for the repechage round
- ReR – advanced to the repechage round by the referee
- ReJ – advanced to the repechage round by the jury of appeal
- S – straight track
- sf – semi-finals
- sh – short-track (events held on a 200 m oval, whether indoors or outdoors); World Athletics adopted this term in place of indoor for these events
- w – wind-assisted performance exceeding the usual +2.0 m/s limit in events for which wind is measured, including the outdoor 100 m, 200 m, long jump and triple jump
- W – wind-assisted combined-events score exceeding the applicable combined-events wind limit
- wo – women-only race
- y – race measurement in yards

=== Field events ===
- NM – no mark (no valid trial recorded)
- o – valid trial in the high jump or pole vault
- x – failed trial
- - – passed trial
- r – retired from competition

=== Race walking events ===
- > – bent knee
- ~ – loss of contact

=== Warnings and disqualifications ===
Athletics results may include codes indicating that an athlete has received a warning or been disqualified. Common abbreviations include YC (yellow card), YRC (second yellow card), RC (red card) and DQ (disqualified). These may be accompanied by the relevant World Athletics Competition Rule (CR) or Technical Rule (TR) number.

For example, DQ TR16.8 indicates disqualification for a false start. A disciplinary infringement may instead be recorded under TR7.1, with an additional rule reference identifying the specific conduct involved. A listed rule does not necessarily require immediate disqualification; some infringements initially result in a warning. Rule numbers and reporting conventions have changed over time, so older results may use different references.

The following are examples of rule references used in competition results. Here CR and TR refer to competition rule and technical rule, rather than record types.

==== Participation, conduct and assistance ====
- TR4.4.1 – failure of a confirmed athlete to participate
- TR4.4.2 – failure of a qualified athlete to participate
- TR4.4.3 – failure to compete with bona fide effort
- TR4.5 – failure to report to the call room
- TR5.1 – failure to comply with clothing requirements
- TR5.2 – failure to comply with footwear requirements
- TR5.7–TR5.9 – failure to comply with athlete bib requirements
- TR6.2 – giving or receiving assistance
- TR6.3.1 – pacing
- TR6.3.2 – possession or use of an electronic device
- TR6.3.3 – use of prohibited technology or appliances
- TR6.3.4 – use of a mechanical aid
- TR6.3.5 – receiving advice or other support from a competition official
- TR6.3.6 – receiving physical support from another athlete
- TR7.1 – improper conduct or unsporting behaviour (unsportsmanlike conduct)
- CR6.1 Note (ii) – failure to comply with the medical delegate's instruction to withdraw or retire from a running or race walking event
- CR6.1 Note (iii) – failure to comply with the medical delegate's instruction to withdraw or retire from a field event
- CR6.1 Note (iv) – failure to comply with the medical delegate's instruction to withdraw or retire from a combined event
- TR16.5.1 – causing a start to be aborted without a valid reason
- TR16.5.2 – delaying the start or failing to comply with the starter's commands
- TR16.5.3 – disturbing the start
- TR17.14 – unauthorised indication of intermediate times
- TR17.15.4 – taking refreshment outside an official station or from another athlete
- TR25.5 – taking a field-event trial out of the prescribed order
- TR25.19 – leaving the competition area without permission
- TR32.4.1 – taping fingers together contrary to the rules
- TR32.4.2 – use of a prohibited device
- TR32.4.3 – use of prohibited or non-compliant gloves
- TR32.4.4 – applying a prohibited substance to the throwing circle or footwear
- TR32.4.5 – spitting or applying bodily fluids to a throwing implement
- TR32.4.6 – applying a prohibited substance to a throwing implement

==== Track events ====
- TR16.8 – false start
- TR17.1.2 – jostling or obstructing another athlete
- TR17.2.3 – lane infringement in a race conducted in lanes
- TR17.2.4 – infringement of the inside border in a race not conducted in lanes
- TR17.3.1 – lane infringement on a bend after being pushed or forced, resulting in a material advantage
- TR17.3.2 – lane infringement on a straight or outer bend, resulting in a material advantage
- TR17.3.3 – single infringement of the inner lane boundary on a bend in a race conducted in lanes; repeated infringements may result in disqualification
- TR17.3.4 – single infringement of the inner track boundary on a bend in a race not conducted entirely in lanes; repeated infringements may result in disqualification
- TR17.5.1 – leaving the assigned lane before the breakline
- TR17.5.2 – leaving the assigned track before the breakpoint
- TR17.6 – re-entering a race after voluntarily leaving the track

==== Hurdles and steeplechase ====
- TR22.6 – failure to go over each hurdle
- TR22.6.1 – passing a leg beside and below the horizontal plane of a hurdle
- TR22.6.2 – knocking down or displacing a hurdle illegally
- TR22.6.3 – knocking down a hurdle and affecting another athlete
- TR22.6.4 – displacing a hurdle and significantly affecting another athlete
- TR23.7 – failure to clear a steeplechase hurdle or negotiate the water jump correctly
- TR23.7.1 – stepping beside the water jump
- TR23.7.2 – passing a leg beside and below the horizontal plane of a steeplechase hurdle

==== Relay events ====
- TR24.5 – running without the baton or illegally enhancing grip of the baton
- TR24.6 – improper recovery of a dropped baton
- TR24.7 – passing the baton outside the takeover zone
- TR24.9 – taking the baton from another team
- TR24.10 – running more than one leg or exceeding the permitted number of substitutes
- TR24.13 – unauthorised change to team composition or running order
- TR24.15 – leaving the assigned lane before the breakline in a 4 × 200 m relay
- TR24.16 – leaving the assigned lane before the breakline in a medley relay
- TR24.17 – leaving the assigned lane before the breakline in a 4 × 400 m relay
- TR24.18.1 – leaving the assigned lane before the breakline in a 4 × 800 m relay
- TR24.21 – starting outside the takeover zone
- TR24.22 – exchanging positions before the takeover
- TR24.23 – jostling or obstruction during a relay takeover

==== Combined events and short track ====
- TR39.8.3 – false start in a combined event
- TR44.6 – leaving the assigned lane before the breakline in a short-track event
- TR48.1 – starting outside the takeover zone in a short-track relay
- TR48.4 – exchanging positions incorrectly before the takeover in a short-track relay
- TR48.5 – exchanging positions incorrectly before the takeover in a short-track relay

==== Race walking and road events ====
- TR54.4.1 – disqualification by the chief race walking judge
- TR54.7.1 – repeated failure to comply with the definition of race walking
- TR54.7.3 – failing to enter the penalty zone or leaving it early
- TR54.7.5 – receiving a fourth red card when the penalty zone is used
- TR54.7.6 – failure of a disqualified athlete to leave the track or course
- TR54.10.8 – taking refreshment outside an official station or from another athlete
- TR54.13 – shortening the prescribed race walking distance
- TR55.5 – starting or completing a road relay takeover outside the takeover zone
- TR55.8.8 – taking refreshment outside an official station or from another athlete
- TR55.10 – shortening the prescribed road racing distance
- TR56.5 – starting or completing a cross-country relay takeover outside the takeover zone
- TR56.9 – shortening the prescribed cross-country distance
- TR57.6 – shortening the course, receiving unauthorised assistance or refreshment, or breaching specific mountain or trail race regulations

==== Historical rule references ====
Older results may use rule numbers from previous editions of the IAAF competition rules. Examples include:

- 40.1 – doping violation during or in connection with a championship
- 40.8 – prior doping violation resulting in suspension during a championship
- 41.1 – doping violation involving one or more members of a relay team
- 149 – entry to a championship based on an invalid performance

These historical references should be interpreted according to the rules in force at the time of the competition.

== Initialisms ==
=== Organising bodies ===
The names of governing bodies and other athletics organisations are frequently abbreviated.

- AA – Australian Athletics – Australia
- AAA – Amateur Athletic Association of England (England); Asian Athletics Association (Asia)
- AAU – Amateur Athletic Union – United States; previously governed amateur track and field before that responsibility passed to The Athletics Congress in 1979
- AFI – Athletics Federation of India – India
- AFMA – African Masters Athletics – Africa
- AK – Athletics Kenya – Kenya
- AMA – Asia Masters Athletics – Asia
- ANA – Authorised Neutral Athletes (designation used in specified historical competitions)
- ANZ – Athletics New Zealand – New Zealand
- APA – Association of Panamerican Athletics – North and South America
- ARAF – All-Russia Athletic Federation – Russia
- ART – Athlete Refugee Team – refugees
- ASUDAMA – South American Association of Master Athletes (Spanish: Asociación Sudamericana de Atletas Master) – South America
- BAAA – Bahamas Association of Athletic Associations – Bahamas
- BAF – Belarus Athletic Federation – Belarus
- BFLA – Bulgarian Athletic Federation – Bulgaria
- CAA – Confederation of African Athletics – Africa
- CACAC – Central American and Caribbean Athletic Confederation – Central America and Caribbean
- CBAt – Confederação Brasileira de Atletismo – Brazil
- CISM – International Military Sports Council – military sport
- CONSUDATLE – Confederación Sudamericana de Atletismo – South America
- CTAA – Chinese Taipei Athletics Association – Taiwan
- DAF – Danish Athletics Federation – Denmark
- DLFV – athletics federation of East Germany (1949–1990)
- DLV – Deutscher Leichtathletik-Verband – Germany
- EAA or EA – European Athletics, formerly the European Athletic Association – Europe
- EAF – Egyptian Athletic Federation – Egypt
- EKJL – Eesti Kergejõustikuliit – Estonia
- EMA – European Masters Athletics – Europe
- FCA – Federación Cubana de Atletismo – Cuba
- FFA – Fédération française d'athlétisme – France
- FIDAL – Federazione Italiana di Atletica Leggera – Italy
- FISU – International University Sports Federation – student athletics
- FRMA – Fédération Royale Marocaine d'Athlétisme – Morocco
- HKAAA – Hong Kong Association of Athletics Affiliates – Hong Kong; Hong Kong Amateur Athletic Association is another name used
- IAAF – International Association of Athletics Federations, the former name of World Athletics (used until 2019) – worldwide
- IAU – International Association of Ultrarunners
- IOC – International Olympic Committee – Olympics
- IPC – International Paralympic Committee – Paralympics
- JAAA – Jamaica Athletics Administrative Association – Jamaica; Jamaica Amateur Athletic Association is another name used
- JAAF – Japan Association of Athletics Federations – Japan
- KAAF – Korean Association of Athletics Federations – South Korea
- KNAU – Royal Dutch Athletics Federation – Netherlands
- NACAC – North American, Central American and Caribbean Athletic Association – North America
- NCAA – National Collegiate Athletic Association – United States (college sport)
- NCCMA – North, Central American and Caribbean Masters Athletics
- NFHS – National Federation of State High School Associations – United States high-school sport
- OAA – Oceania Athletics Association – Oceania
- OMA – Oceania Masters Athletics – Oceania
- PZLA – Polski Związek Lekkiej Atletyki – Poland
- QAF – Qatar Athletics Federation – Qatar
- RFEA – Real Federación Española de Atletismo – Spain
- TAC – The Athletics Congress, predecessor to USA Track & Field (1979–1992) – United States
- TAF – Turkish Athletic Federation – Turkey
- UKA – UK Athletics – United Kingdom
- USATF – USA Track & Field – United States
- WA – World Athletics – worldwide
- WAVA – World Association of Veteran Athletes, the former name of World Masters Athletics – masters athletics
- WMA – World Masters Athletics – international masters athletics (generally athletes aged 35 and over)
- WMRA – World Mountain Running Association

=== Publications and statisticians ===
- ARRS – Association of Road Racing Statisticians
- ATFS – Association of Track and Field Statisticians
- AW – Athletics Weekly
- NUTS – National Union of Track Statisticians – United Kingdom
- T&FN – Track & Field News

== Events ==
Due to the large number of athletics events that are regularly contested, results and statistics often use abbreviated event names. The following list includes established and historical abbreviations; the new senior race-walk distances adopted in 2026 are identified by their full names where a standard abbreviated form has not been verified. Event codes are grouped by discipline for ease of reference.

=== Running events ===
- 50m – 50 metres
- 60m – 60 metres
- 100m – 100 metres
- 150m – 150 metres
- 200m – 200 metres
- 300m – 300 metres
- 400m – 400 metres
- 500m – 500 metres
- 600m – 600 metres
- 800m – 800 metres
- 1000m – 1000 metres
- 1500m – 1500 metres
- 2000m – 2000 metres
- 3000m – 3000 metres
- 5000m – 5000 metres
- 10,000m – 10000 metres
- RMile – road mile
- HMar (or HM) – half marathon
- Mar – marathon

=== Hurdles and steeplechase ===
- 2000mSC – 2000 metres steeplechase
- 3000mSC – 3000 metres steeplechase
- 50mH – 50 metres hurdles
- 60mH – 60 metres hurdles
- 80mH – 80 metres hurdles
- 100mH – 100 metres hurdles
- 110mH – 110 metres hurdles
- 300mH – 300 metres hurdles
- 400mH – 400 metres hurdles

=== Field events ===
- HJ – high jump
- PV – pole vault
- LJ – long jump
- TJ – triple jump
- SP – shot put
- DT – discus throw
- HT – hammer throw
- JT – javelin throw
- WT – weight throw

=== Combined events ===
- Pen – pentathlon
- Hex – hexathlon
- Hep – heptathlon
- Oct – octathlon
- Dec – decathlon
- CE – combined events

=== Race walking ===
- 3000mRW – 3000 metres race walk
- 5000mRW – 5000 metres race walk
- 10,000mRW – 10,000 metres race walk
- 20,000mRW – 20,000 metres race walk
- 10kmRW – 10 kilometres race walk
- 20kmRW – 20 kilometres race walk (long-standing senior championship distance; superseded by the half-marathon distance in senior World Athletics Series competition from 2026)
- 35kmRW – 35 kilometres race walk (historical senior championship distance)
- 50kmRW – 50 kilometres race walk (historical senior championship distance)
- Half-marathon race walk – half-marathon race walk (21.0975 km; introduced as a senior World Athletics Series distance in 2026)
- Marathon race walk – marathon race walk (42.195 km; introduced as a senior World Athletics Series distance in 2026)

=== Relays ===
- 4 × 100mR – 4 × 100 metres relay
- 4 × 200mR – 4 × 200 metres relay
- 4 × 400mR – 4 × 400 metres relay
- 4 × 400mR Mx – mixed 4 × 400 metres relay
- 4 × 800mR – 4 × 800 metres relay
- 4 × 1500mR – 4 × 1500 metres relay
- MixedR – mixed relay
- DMR – distance medley relay
- SHR – shuttle hurdle relay
- SMR – sprint medley relay

=== Cross-country running ===
- XC or CC – cross country running

== Competitions ==
- AAG – African Games
- AfC – African Championships in Athletics
- AsC – Asian Athletics Championships
- CWG – Commonwealth Games
- DL – Diamond League
- EC or ECh – European Athletics Championships
- ECCC – European Cross Country Championships
- EG – European Games
- EIC – European Athletics Indoor Championships
- EJC – European Athletics Junior Championships
- ESAA – English Schools' Athletics Championships
- ETC – European Team Championships
- ISTAF – Internationales Stadionfest Berlin
- LYG – London Youth Games
- OAC – Oceania Athletics Championships
- OG – Olympic Games
- PAG – Pan American Games
- PG – Pacific Games
- SAG – South Asian Games
- SEAG – Southeast Asian Games
- WAS – World Athletics Series
- WC or WCh – World Championships in Athletics
- WCH – World Athletics Championships
- WCT – World Athletics Continental Tour
- WHM – World Half Marathon Championships (historical competition; superseded by the World Road Running Championships)
- WIC – World Athletics Indoor Championships
- WIT – World Athletics Indoor Tour
- WJC – World Junior Championships in Athletics
- WRE – World Athletics Relays
- WRR – World Athletics Road Running Championships
- WU20 – World Athletics U20 Championships
- WXC – World Athletics Cross Country Championships
- WYC – IAAF World Youth Championships in Athletics
