= Dharam Veer =

Dharam Veer may refer to:

- Dharam Veer (film), a 1977 Bollywood film, directed by Manmohan Desai and starring Dharmendra and Jeetendra
- Dharam Veer (TV series), an Indian period drama
- Dharamvir Malhotra, a fictional character played by Anupam Kher in the 1995 Indian film Dilwale Dulhania Le Jayenge

== See also ==
- Dharmaveer, a 2022 Indian Marathi-language film
  - Dharmaveer 2, its 2024 sequel
- Dharmaveera K Govindaswamy Naidu, an Indian industrialist
- Dharma Vira, an Indian politician
- Dharam Vir Ahluwalia, an Indian physicist
- Dharam Vir Vasisht, an Indian politician
- Dharamvir Bharati, an Indian poet and writer in Hindi
- Dharamvir Dhillon, president of the Masters Athletics Federation of India
- Dharamvir Gandhi, an Indian politician
- Dharamvir Singh, Indian field hockey player
- Dharamvir Singh Tyagi, an Indian politician
- Dharamvir Yadav, an Indian politician
