= Masters M70 3000 metres world record progression =

This is the progression of world record improvements of the 3000 metres M70 division of Masters athletics. Records must be set in properly conducted, official competitions under the standing IAAF rules unless modified by World Masters Athletics. The M70 division consists of male athletes who have reached the age of 70 but have not yet reached the age of 75, so exactly from their 70th birthday to the day before their 75th birthday.

Key

Incomplete information Pending better indoor records

Hand	Auto	Athlete	Nationality	Birthdate	Age	Location	Date	Ref
	10:38.98	Eddy Vierendeels	Belgium	7 November 1952	70 years, 233 days	Ninove	28 June 2023	
	10:40.56	John Bermingham	Australia	24 June 1951	71 years, 270 days	Bendigo	21 March 2023	
	10:38.15 i	Luciano Moser	Italy	28 January 1953	70 years, 36 days	Padua	5 March 2023	
	10:42.40	Simon Herlaar	Netherlands	28 June 1929	70 years, 4 days	Beverwijk	2 July 1999	
11:00.0 h		Rune Bergman	Sweden	8 October 1924	70 years, 19 days	Gothenburg	27 October 1994	
11:50.0 h		Pietro Nasi	Italy	11 December 1917	70 years, 324 days	Catania	30 October 1988	
