= Masters Athletics Federation of India =

Masters Athletics Federation of India (MAFI)
- Country: India
- Code: IND
- Created: Asian Games 400 Mts gold medalist Shri. Milkha Singh was the first President
- Recognized: MAFI is an affiliated member of Asia Masters Athletics and World Masters Athletics
- Headquarters: Bangalore India
- President: [Dharamvir Dhillon] life-time president as of 2014
- Secretary General: David Premnath
- Website: www.mastersathletics.in
- Notes: The Masters Athletics Federation (also referred to as MAFI) is the apex body for running and managing athletics for Indian Athletes 35 years of age and above. MAFI is an autonomous organisation which functions according to its set constitution and bylaws. MAFI is an independent federation in India and will not be a part of or under the purview of any other organization or federation in India

The Masters Athletics Federation of India (MAFI) is the body responsible for selecting masters athletes to represent India at the World Masters Games, Asia Masters Athletics Championships and other international Masters athletic meets and for managing the Indian teams at the events.

== History ==
Each individual country governs its own affairs with an organizational governing body that is an affiliate to WMA. Masters Athletics Federation of India (MAFI) is affiliated with World Masters Athletics and Asia Masters Athletics. India has hosted the Asia Masters Athletics Championships three times.

== See also ==
- World Masters Athletics
- Sports Authority of India
- Indian Olympic Association
- Paralympic Committee of India
