= Masters M85 pole vault world record progression =

This is the progression of world record improvements of the pole vault M85 division of Masters athletics.

Key

Incomplete information Pending Indoor mark
IAAF includes indoor marks in the record list since 2000, but WMA does not follow that practice.

Height	Athlete	Nationality	Birthdate	Age	Location	Date	Ref
2.28 m	Frank Dickey	United States	7 January 1932	75 years, 92 days	San Antonio	9 April 2007	
2.44 m i	William Bell	United States	19 March 1922	85 years, 4 days	Boston	23 March 2007	
2.24 m	Carol Johnston	United States	24 December 1911	85 years, 227 days	Norwalk	8 August 1997	
2.28 m i	Carol Johnston	United States	24 December 1911	85 years, 54 days	Eagle Rock	16 February 1997	
2.00 m	Ahti Pajunen	Finland	3 December 1909	85 years, 197 days	Lahti	18 June 1995	
