= Innovative Timing Systems =

Sports equipment company in Missouri

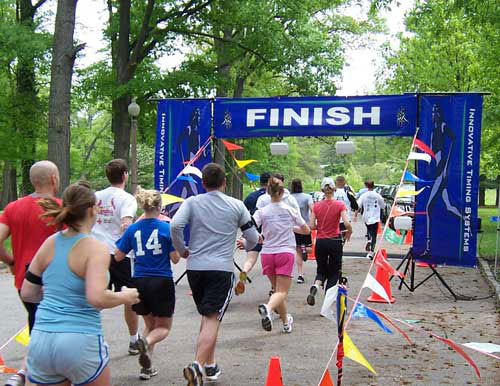
A finish line which uses transponder timing and RFID technology through overhead antennas and passive, disposable chips.

Innovative Timing Systems (ITS) is a privately held company located in Saint Louis, Missouri which manufactures transponder timing equipment for sports. Its Jaguar system is a Gen 2.0 Radio Frequency Identification (RFID) system operating at ultra high frequencies. Over 500 Jaguar timers use the system to time running, bicycle, motorcycle, paddleboard and triathlon events.

ITS was one of the first vendors to offer disposable transponders affixed to the back of a race number rather than the prior method of wearing the transponder on a runner's shoe. To do this, Jaguar's antennas are mounted above ground on tripods or trusses instead of imbedded into mats on the ground. The Jaguar system was introduced in August 2008 after beta testing at 50 events. ITS holds a patent for using a foam backing to separate transponders from the sweat-covered skin of athletes, among other inventions.

In addition to offering Jaguar timing systems and a variety of transponders, ITS also manufactures race clocks. These light emitting diode displays are integrated with the Jaguar system to allow a computer to display custom information (such as elapsed time or number of laps) as each athlete passes the clock.

ITS also operates the Its Your Race registration website. The website coordinates with a smart phone application. It collects online registrations from participants and offers them finisher certificates customized for each athlete. It also sells photographs that were taken by cameras that were triggered by transponder reads during the race.

ITS also maintains a suite of specialized software to operate the timing equipment and integrate it with the clocks, flat panel displays, result websites, touch panel kiosks and tablets.

Seeking some of the largest races to become clients, in November 2014, ITS offered to time any race of more than 20,000 athletes for free, if it could perform their registration and photography as well.
