= Asia Masters Athletics Championships =

Biennial event

- Genre: senior sports; Masters athletics
- Frequency: biennial
- Website: asia-masters-athletics.com

The Asia Masters Athletics Championships are the biennial championship of Asia Masters Athletics (AMA), one of six continental based regional affiliates of World Masters Athletics (WMA), known as the World Association of Veteran Athletes (WAVA) from its formation in 1977 until 2001. WMA is the global governing body for the division of Masters athletics. It is held in opposite years from the World Masters Athletics Championships. The event also hosts the Asia Masters General Assembly, the political gathering of the AMA which selects the locations of subsequent championships.

Taipei, Taiwan was selected to hold the 2012 championships. This is significant because China was a member of AMA at the time. Taiwan had hosted the championships previously but since China joined AMA, it had blocked bids on the island. This could be a softening of the difficult relations between the two capitols which both have claimed each other's territories since 1949.

The last AMA Championships was held on December 2–6, 2019 in Kuching, Sarawak, Malaysia. The latest event of the AMA Championship after the Covid-19 Pandemic is being held on November 8–12, 2023 in New Clark City, Capas, Tarlac, Philippines.

The next AMA Championships (The 23rd AMAC 2025) will be held on November 5-10, 2025 in Chennai, Tamil Nadu, India.

== Championships ==
Edition	Year	City	Country
1	1981	Singapore	Singapore
2	1983	New Delhi	India
3	1985	Singapore	Singapore
4	1986	Jakarta	Indonesia
5	1988	Tainan	Taiwan
6	1990	Kuala Lumpur	Malaysia
7	1992	Singapore	Singapore
8	1994	Jakarta	Indonesia
9	1996	Seoul	South Korea
10	1998	Okinawa	Japan
11	2000	Bangalore	India
12	2002	Dalian	China
13	2004	Bangkok	Thailand
14	2006	Bangalore	India
15	2009	Chiang Mai	Thailand
16	2010	Kuala Lumpur	Malaysia
17	2012	Taipei	Taiwan
18	2014	Kitakami	Japan
19	2016	Singapore	Singapore
20	2017	Rugao	China
21	2019	Kuching	Malaysia
22	2023	Capas	Philippines
23	2025	Chennai	India

== Results ==
=== 2016 ===
19th Asia Masters Athletics Championships 2016 Medal Table

Rank	Nation	Gold	Silver	Bronze	Total
1	China	77	55	28	160
2	India	75	70	71	216
3	Japan	63	32	26	121
4	Chinese Taipei	28	31	26	85
5	Sri Lanka	26	48	53	127
6	Thailand	21	13	10	44
7	Philippines	21	11	6	38
8	Indonesia	17	13	24	54
9	Singapore	14	28	35	77
10	Malaysia	14	21	18	53
11	Hong Kong	12	13	17	42
12	Mongolia	9	16	8	33
13	Kazakhstan	6	6	6	18
14	Iran	3	4	1	8
15	Brunei	1	0	1	2
16	Uzbekistan	1	0	1	2
17	South Korea	1	0	0	1
18	Bangladesh	0	1	0	1
19	Pakistan	0	1	0	1
No Rank	New Zealand	5	1	0	6
No Rank	Australia	4	1	0	4
No Rank	Turkey	1	1	0	2
No Rank	Russia	1	0	2	3
No Rank	United States	1	0	0	1
Total					

- http://www.singaporeathletics.org.sg/amac2016/?frontpagetab=4

=== 2017 ===
20th Asia Masters Athletics Championships 2017 Medal Table

Rank	Nation	Gold	Silver	Bronze	Total
1	China	209	184	129	522
2	India	37	43	66	146
3	Japan	34	28	16	78
4	Sri Lanka	32	37	47	116
5	Chinese Taipei	31	23	24	78
6	Thailand	24	13	4	41
7	Iran	18	12	13	43
8	Hong Kong	11	19	24	54
9	Kazakhstan	9	8	5	22
10	Indonesia	8	1	3	12
11	Malaysia	7	6	6	19
12	Philippines	5	5	6	16
13	Singapore	4	5	9	18
14	Mongolia	2	9	8	17
15	Uzbekistan	0	1	0	1
16	Fiji	0	0	0	0
No Rank	Austria	0	0	0	0
No Rank	Ireland	0	0	0	0
No Rank	New Zealand	0	0	0	0
No Rank	United States	0	0	0	0
Total					

- http://www.amac2017.cn/Category_131/Index.aspx

=== 2023 ===
Results:

=== 2025 ===
Results:
