= North, Central American and Caribbean Masters Athletics =

Sports competition

NCCMA
- Genre: sporting event; Masters athletics
- Frequency: biennial
- Website: nccmasterathletics.com

The North, Central American and Caribbean Masters Athletics (NCCMA, or NCCWMA) is part of World Masters Athletics, responsible for organizing masters athletics regional competitions in an area covering North America, Central America, and the Caribbean. All athletes 35 years of age or older are eligible to compete. The biennial Championships are held in alternate years with the WMA Outdoor Championships.

== Championships ==
| Edition | Year | Host city | Country | Dates |
|---|---|---|---|---|
| 1 | 1998 | Bridgetown | Barbados | 19 – 22 November |
| 2 | 2000 | Kamloops | Canada | 17 – 20 August |
| 3 | 2002 | León, Guanajuato | Mexico | 22 – 25 August |
| 4 | 2004 | Dorado, Puerto Rico | Puerto Rico | 26 – 29 August |
| 5 | 2006 | Guatemala City | Guatemala | 24 – 27 August |
| 6 | 2008 | Clermont, Florida | USA | 28 – 31 August |
| 7 | 2010 | Mayagüez, Puerto Rico | Puerto Rico | 3 – 6 September |
| 8 | 2012 | Saint John, New Brunswick | Canada | 9 – 12 August |
| 9 | 2014 | San José, Costa Rica | Costa Rica | 21 – 24 August |
| 10 | 2017 | Toronto | Canada | 11 – 13 August |
| 11 | 2019 | Toronto | Canada | 18 – 21 July |
| 12 | 2023 | Ciudad Juárez, Chihuahua | Mexico | 19 – 22 November [12] |
| 13 | 2025 | Mexico City, State of Mexico | Mexico | 6 – 9 November [13] |
| 14 | 2027 | Calgary, Alberta | Canada | 19 – 22 August |
