= Targa timing =

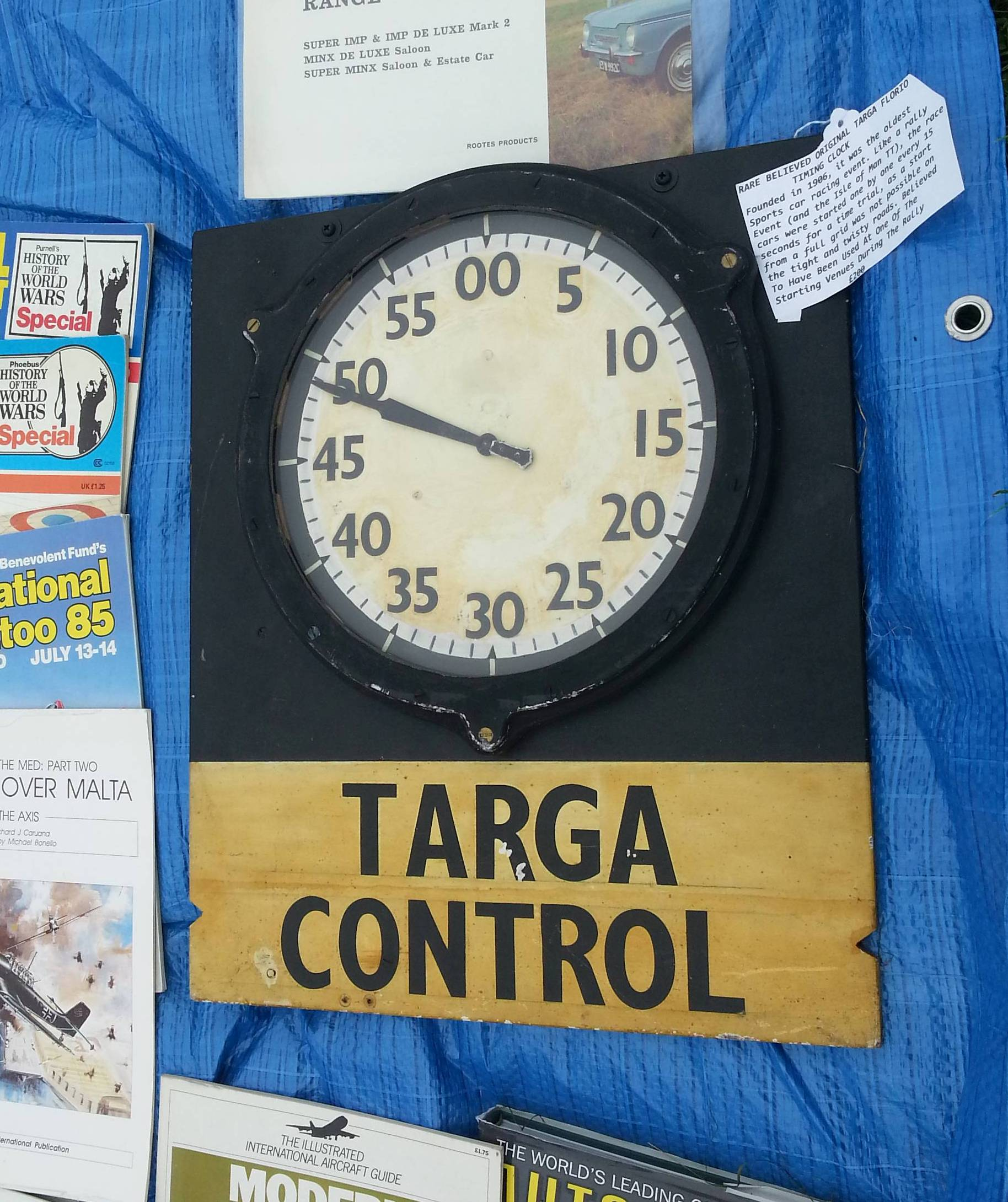
Control clock

Targa timing (not to be confused with target timing) is a system of timing used in car rallying. It was invented by John Brown, the Clerk of the Course for the Targa Rusticana, a road rally (named after the Italian Targa Florio) organised in Wales in the 1960s by Oxford University Motor Drivers Club. Targa timing became the standard timing method used on rallies for almost 20 years following its invention in 1963. However, it was eventually banned as it became widely abused—the standard method by which organisers could set very high average speeds in a manner that left no permanent record.

== History ==
In all rallies, competitors run against the clock, rather than directly against each other. The winner is the crew losing the fewest penalties for failing to maintain the set average speeds (either under or over). However, determining this result in a fair and logistically feasible manner can be quite a challenge, especially as events may cover a wide area and be broken up into many different sections. Targa timing was one of the practical timing systems developed to allow rapid and accurate results calculation to take place.

By the early 1960s, competitors would carry a sealed watch with them, and show it to the marshal at time controls along the route, who would record the time. The system worked, but was open to tampering and a variety of tricks employed by competitors to cheat. To combat this, the system changed so that each marshal would have his own clock, each of which had been synchronised at the start of the event. In a standard timed event, run to so-called BBC or "telecom" time, each clock would simply show the time of day to the nearest second. A characteristic of this type of timing is that the average speeds calculated for each section are easy to compute, and if this involved breaking the law with respect of speed limits, etc., it could cause problems for organisers, since it could be seen as an incitement. A competitor's time card would list the actual times and stand as a permanent record of the speeds at which they had driven to attain them. In addition, computing results was a slow and laborious process.

Targa timing solved these problems. On a targa-timed event, each clock is not synchronised to all of the others. Instead, each successive clock is retarded behind by the exact amount that the competitor is due to take to reach that clock en route. Thus, if they are exactly on time, the clock will show exactly the same time at every time control they visit, making it very easy to see whether they are ahead or behind, and if so by how much. In addition, since on most events cars are started at one-minute intervals, and the cars are numbered and started in sequence, the time shown on the clock will be their competition number if they are on time. To clarify this, imagine a notional car "0" which starts the event at time 00:00 at every point on the route, if they are on time, the clocks will always show 0:00:00. Likewise car 1 will see 0:01:00, car 2 sees 0:02:00 and so on. If Car 1 sees a time of 0:05:XX, they know instantly that they have lost at least four minutes. Incidentally, this is the origin of rally competition numbering skipping numbers 60–99, then continuing with 100, (1:00:00 on the clock) which corresponds to a due time of +1 hour. This is still occasionally seen, though it can be a problem for public relations, leading naturally but incorrectly to perceptions of there being "hundreds of cars" in a rally.

=== Issues ===
The original objective of targa timing was to speed delivery of rally results, and the rally paperwork set out the amount by which each control's clock was offset. This always remained the case on the Targa Rusticana, but other organisers soon realised that targa timing could be used to conceal the calculated average speed for a section, since the competitors have no way of knowing by how much each clock has been retarded. This in turn led to a further use of targa timing which in practice was its true advantage to organisers—it allowed them to, untraceably, set very high average speeds for competitive driving. This in turn led to the concept of a "target" or "bogey" time for a section, known only to the organisers—the upshot was that crews basically needed to drive as fast as possible to stay on time. The participants' time cards only showed the recorded targa time, and not the actual time taken, so it was not possible to use it as a permanent record of the speeds driven; no record was left that could incriminate anyone after the event.

For road rallies, targa timing was banned in 1988, along with a number of other rule changes designed to slow such events down—from then on only ordinary "time of day" timing was permitted. Many of the 'old school' competitors lament this change, though organisers have found new ways to keep events fun and challenging for entrants.
