= Competition number =

Number used to identify sport competitors

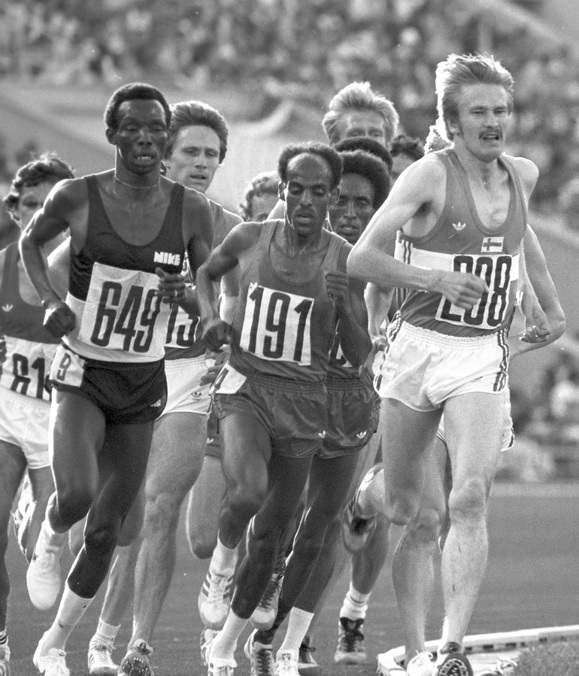
Competition numbers on bibs of competitors in the 1980 Olympic 5000m

In many sports, a competition number is used to identify and differentiate the competitors taking part in a competitive endeavour. For example, runners in a race may wear prominent competition numbers so that they may be clearly identified from a distance. Competition numbers are differentiated from uniform numbers in that the former are used for a specific event (for example, competition numbers worn by marathon runners) while the latter persist over time through multiple events, seasons, or sometimes an entire career (for example, uniform numbers worn by Major League Baseball players).

Competition numbers may also be called bib numbers when worn on bibs over, or affixed to, the athletes' tops. With new technology, bibs might contain timing chips for electronic identification. In addition to identifying an athlete, many high profile events also imprint sponsor logos. In such high profile events, bib numbers are mandatory. Failure to wear them could make an athlete subject to disqualification.

== Athletics ==
Since the 2000s, track and field athletes at major competitions wear their names as well as their numbers on their bibs. In relay events, all team members have the IOC country code. Track athletes also wear lane numbers on the shorts called "hip numbers", for identification by the fully automatic timing system which photographs athletes from the side as they cross a finish line. In racewalking events, competitors also must wear numbers on their backs for identification by the judges after a violation has been detected.

In mixed competitions, like marathons, where professional athletes run on the same course as non-elite athletes, the professionals traditionally wear bibs with their names to differentiate their pre-race status.

=== Gallery ===
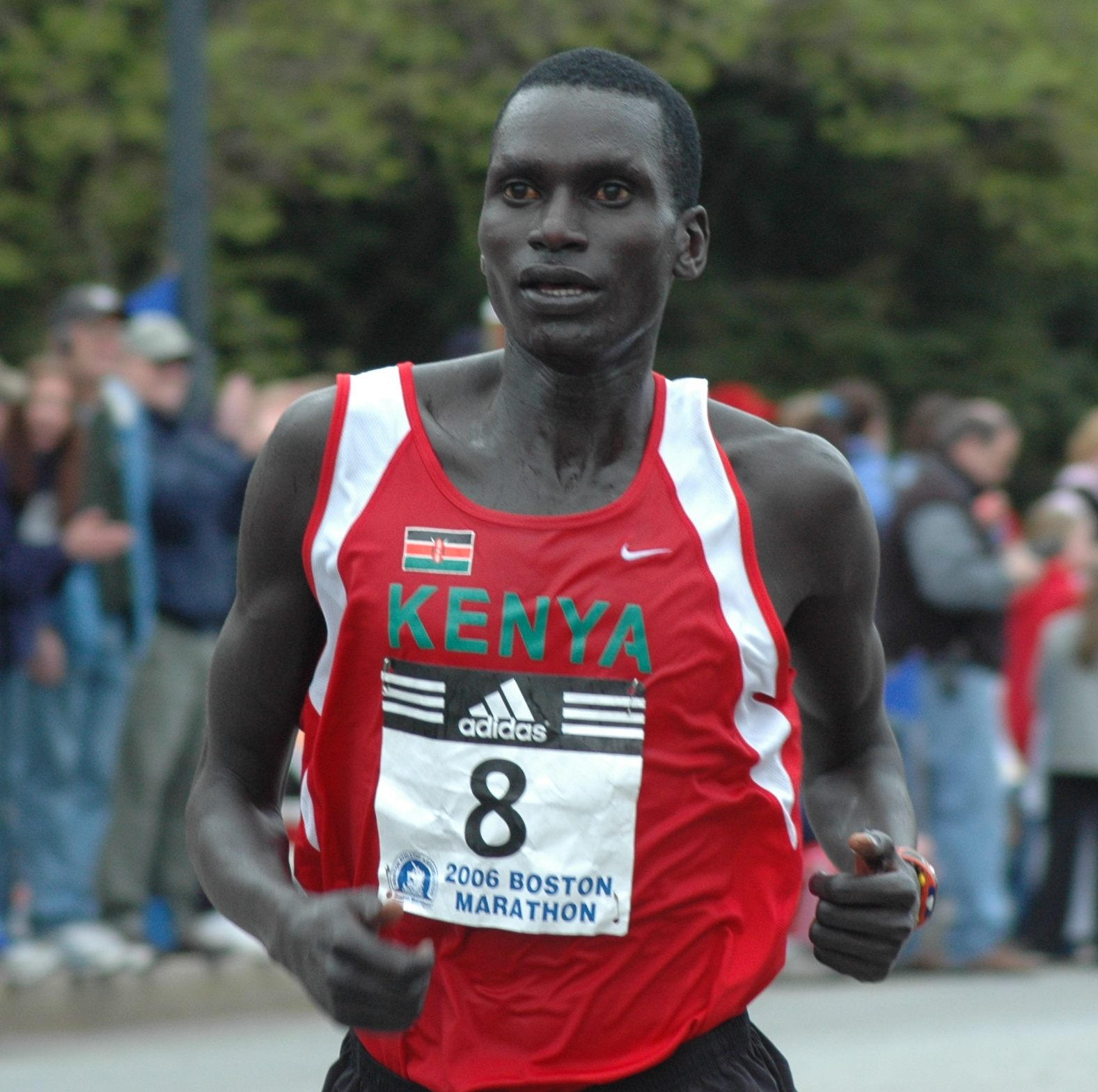
Robert Kipkoech Cheruiyot in the 2006 Boston Marathon with number on front of bib

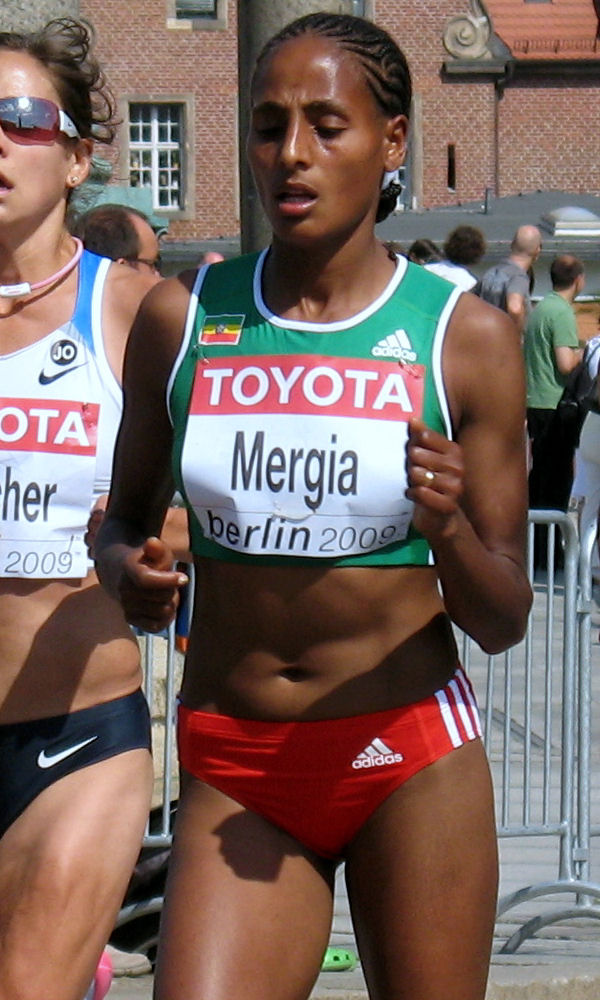
2009 World marathon runner with surname on front of bib

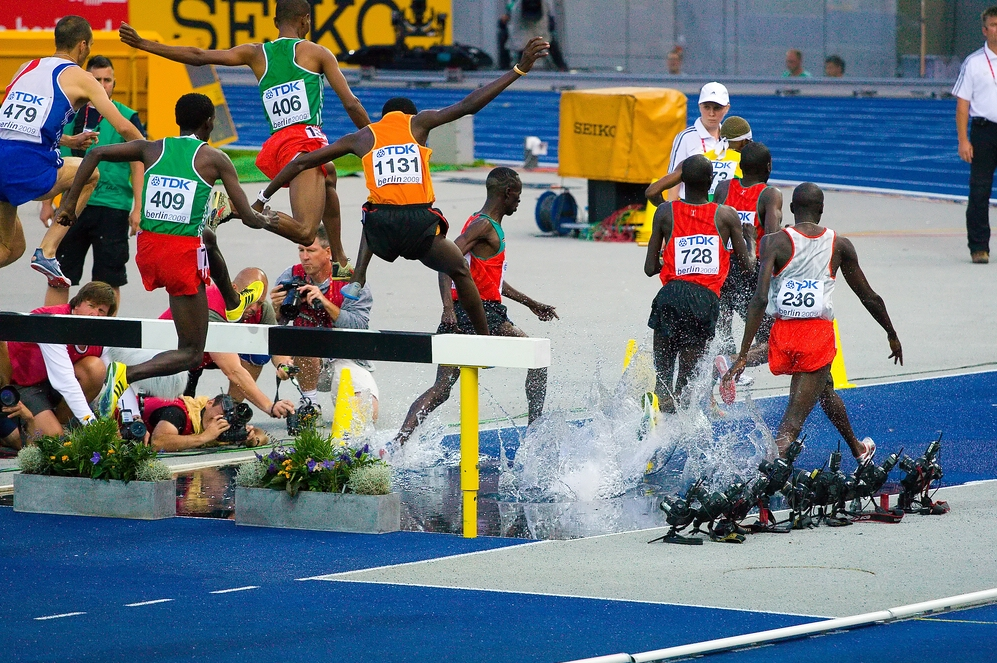
2009 World steeplechase runners with numbers on the back of bibs

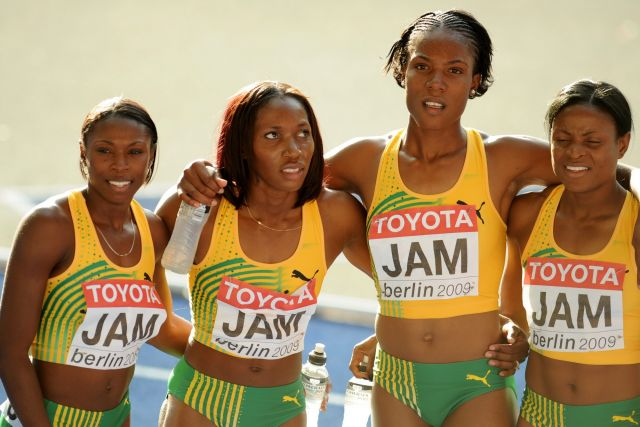
2009 World 4 × 400 m relay team with "JAM" for the Jamaican team

== Motorsport ==
In some types of motorsport, such as rallys, competition numbers are attached to the vehicles taking part in a specific event. The competition number can also be used in conjunction with some kinds of timing systems, such as targa timing.

=== Gallery ===
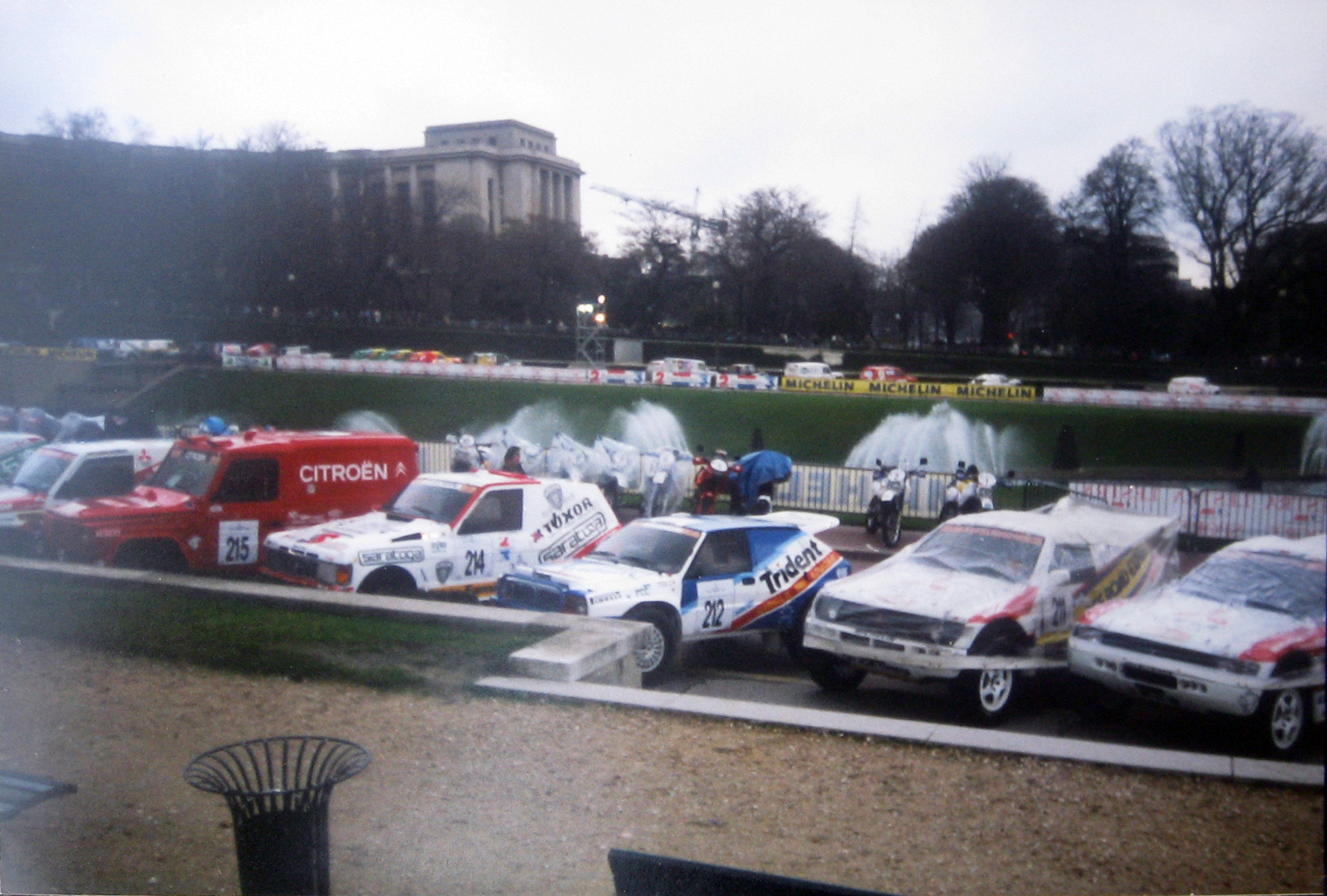
Cars of the 1992 Dakar Rally, with competition numbers visible

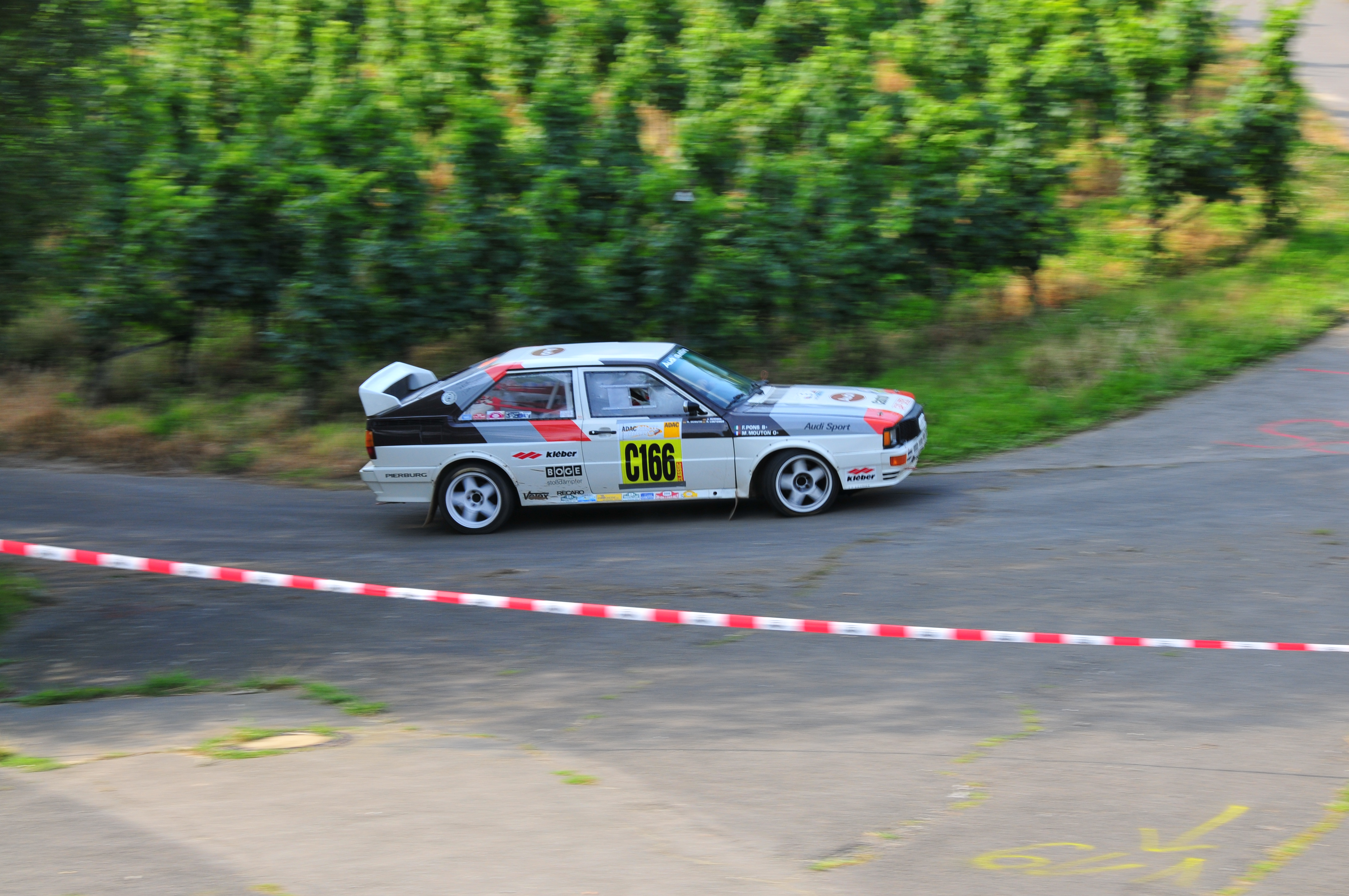
A rally competitor displaying competition number C166

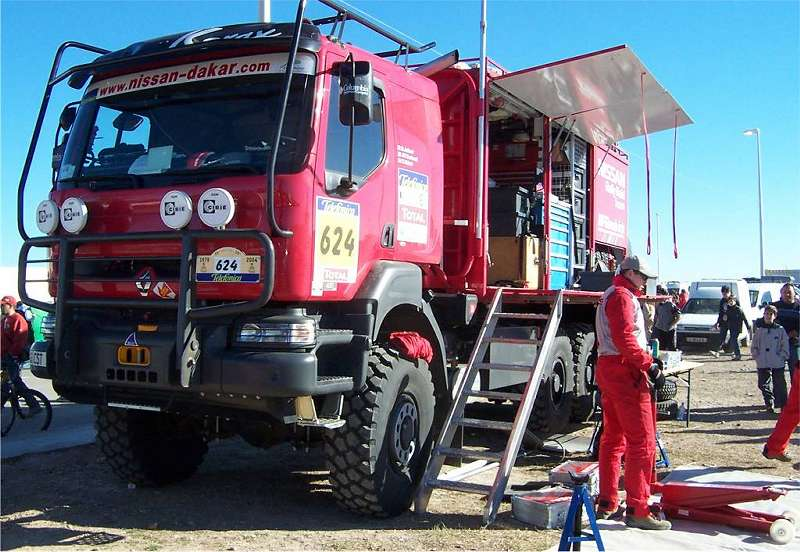
A rally support truck, with competition number 624 visible

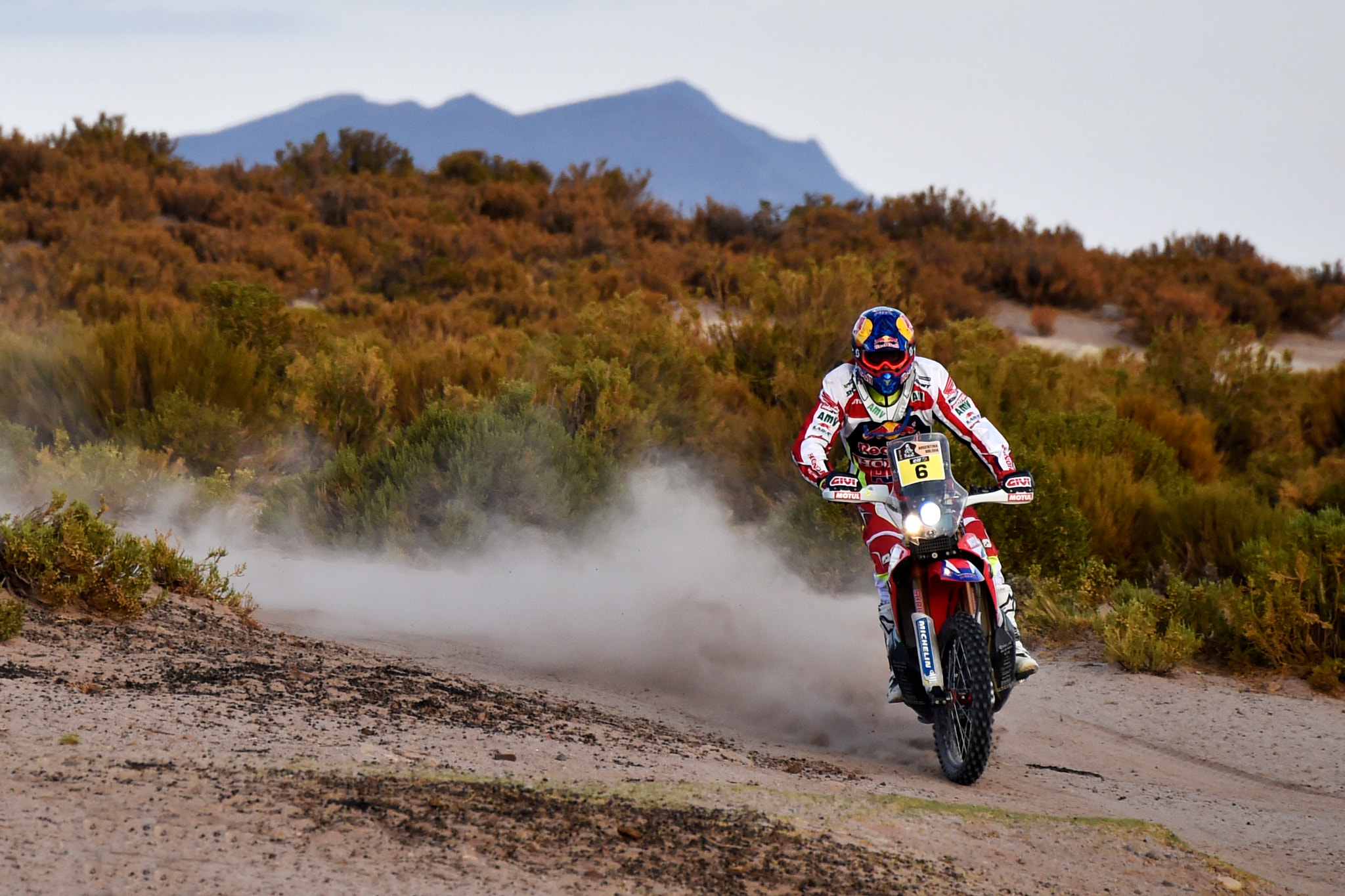
A motorcycle rally competitor, with competition number 6 visible

== Other sports ==
Other sports that may utilize competition numbers include:

- Alpine skiing
- Biathlon
- BMX racing
- Gymnastics
- Snowboarding
- Triathlon

=== Gallery ===
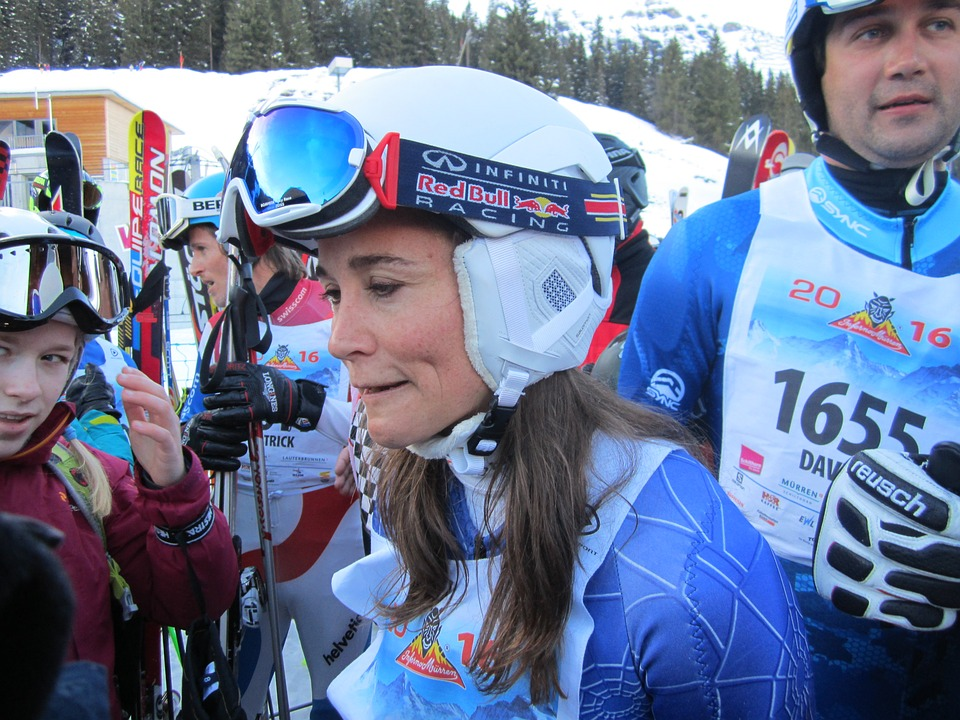
Alpine skiers

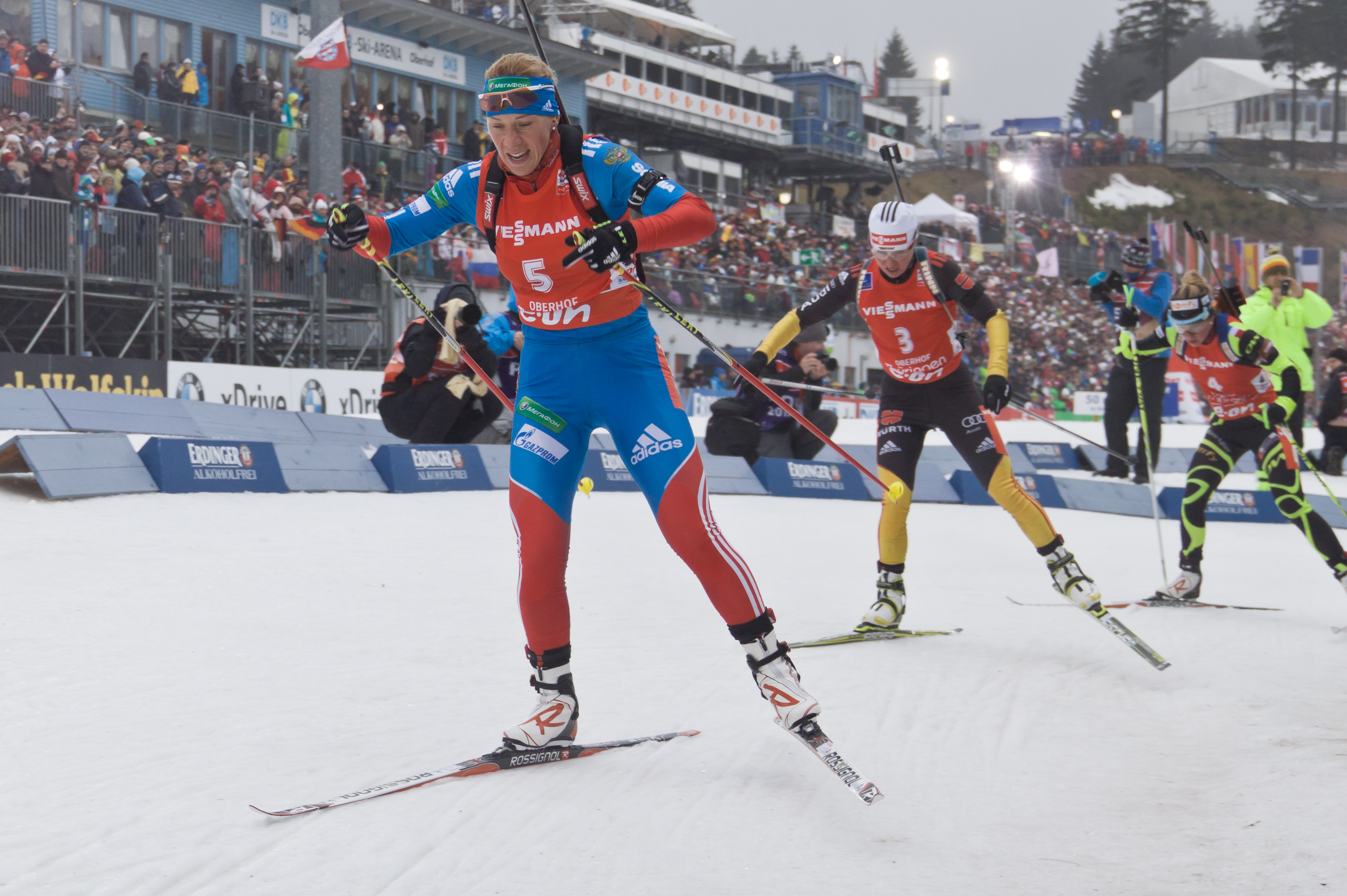
Biathaletes

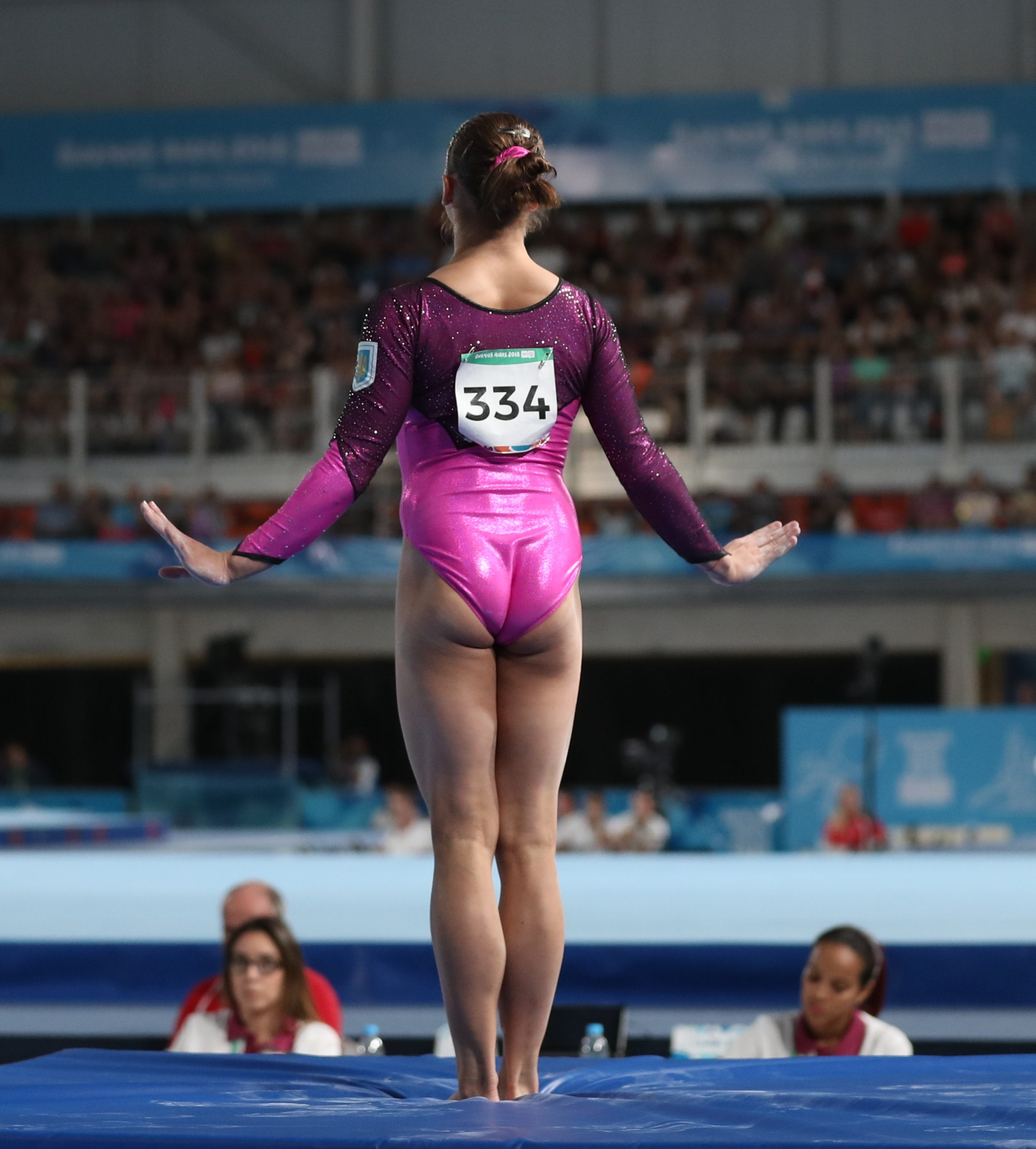
Gymnast

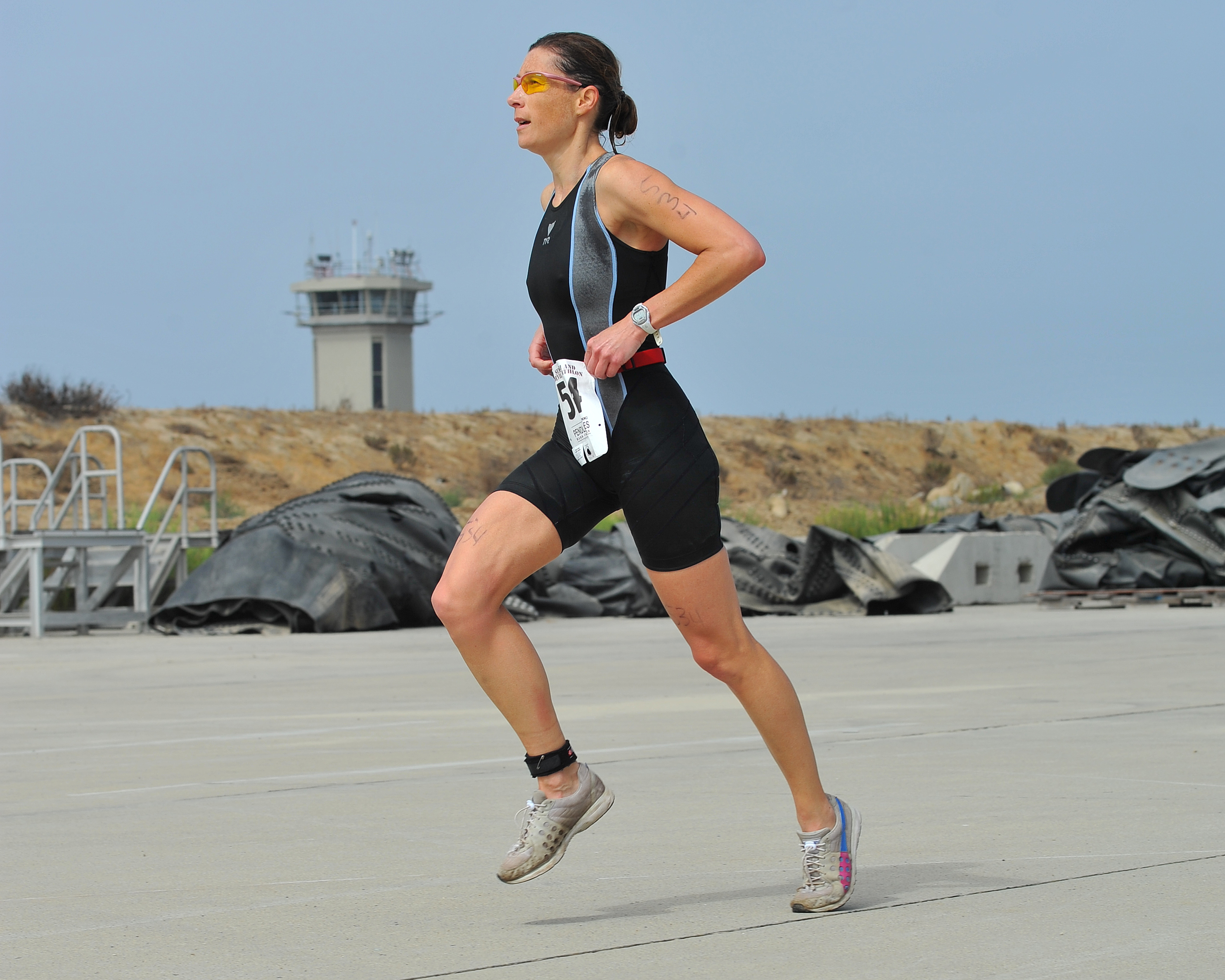
Triathlete

== Notable competition numbers ==
While the uniform numbers of various sportspeople have become well-known (for example, Wayne Gretzky's 99, Michael Jordan's 23, and Mickey Mantle's 7), this is rare for competition numbers, which generally are used by an athlete only for a single event. Some notable exceptions include:

- 6 used by Paul Bikle, a gliding competitor. The Bikle T-6, a glider, was named for Bikle's competition number and the T-tailed design of the aircraft.
- 13 in cycling, which is commonly worn upside-down due to triskaidekaphobia.
- 51 in the Tour de France, due to a false belief that it has been worn by more winners than any other number.
- 261 in the Boston Marathon, due to it being worn by Kathrine Switzer in the 1967 edition of the event, when she became the first woman to run the race as a numbered entrant. Switzer later created a non-profit organization named 261 Fearless.

At the 2019 Boston Marathon, organizers gave special bib numbers to several celebrities. Former NFL player Tedy Bruschi was given 5454, his uniform number repeated; NASCAR driver Jimmie Johnson was given 4848, his car number with Hendrick Motorsports repeated; and Joan Benoit Samuelson was given 1979, the year of her first win in the event.
