= South American Association of Master Athletes =

Sports competition

ASUDAMA
- Genre: Masters athletics; sporting event
- Frequency: biennial
- Website: www.asudama.com

South American Association of Master Athletes (Spanish: Asociación Sudamericana de Atletas Máster, or ASUDAMA) is a regional body of World Masters Athletics, responsible for organizing masters athletics championship competitions for athletes from the continent of South America. It was founded in Buenos Aires on 15 December, 1979 as Spanish: Asociación Sudamericana de Atletas Veteranos (ASUDAVE). All athletes 35 years of age or older are eligible to compete. The biennial Championships are held in alternate years with the WMA Outdoor Championships.

== Championships ==
Edition	Year	Host city	Country	Dates
1	1982			
2	1984			
3	1986			
4	1988			
5	1990			
6	1992			
7	1994			
8	1996			
9	1998			
10	2000			
11	2002			
12	2004	Montevideo	Uruguay	6 November – 13 November
14	2008	Rosario	Argentina	22 November – 29 November
15	2010	Santiago	Chile	23 November – 28 November
16	2012	Arequipa	Peru	10 November – 17 November
17	2014	Medellín	Colombia	1 November – 9 November
19	2017	Santiago	Chile	6 November – 12 November
20	2022	Bogotá	Colombia	20 November – 27 November
