= African Masters Athletics =

Sports competition

- Genre: Masters athletics; sporting event
- Frequency: biennial

The African Masters Athletics (AFMA) is a regional body of World Masters Athletics, responsible for organizing masters athletics championship competitions for athletes from the continent of Africa. It was founded on 12 May, 1994 as African Veterans Athletic Association (AVAA). All athletes 35 years of age or older are eligible to compete. The biennial Championships are held in alternate years with the WMA Outdoor Championships.

== African Masters Athletics Championship ==
Edition	Year	Host city	Country	Dates
1	2000			
2	2002			
3	2004			
4	2006			
5	2008			
6	2010			
7	2012	Johannesburg	South Africa	
8	2013	Lagos	Nigeria	6 December – 7 December
9	2016	Limbe, Cameroon	Cameroon	27 May – 29 May
10	2017	Abidjan	Ivory Coast	25 August – 27 August
12	2019	Radès	Tunisia	6 February – 9 February
13	2021	Nairobi	Kenya	22 November – 27 November
14	2023	Pretoria	South Africa	16 November – 18 November
