= Dharamvir Yadav =

Indian politician

- Constituency: Salhawas

Member of the Haryana Legislative Assembly
- In office 1996–2000

Minister, Government of Haryana

Personal details
- Party: Haryana Vikas Party

Dharamvir Yadav was MLA from Haryana Vikas Party from Salhawas (Vidhan Sabha constituency) in 1996 Haryana Legislative Assembly election. He died in 2016.
