= Oceania Masters Athletics =

Sports competition

- Genre: Masters athletics; sporting event
- Frequency: biennial

Oceania Masters Athletics (OMA) is a regional body of World Masters Athletics, responsible for organising masters athletics championship competitions for athletes from the countries of Oceania. It was founded in 1984 as Oceania Association of Veteran Athletes (OAVA) or Oceania Association of Masters Athletes (OAMA); the name was formally changed to OMA in 2012. All athletes 30 years of age or older are eligible to compete. The biennial Championships are held in alternate years with the WMA Outdoor Championships.

A new Oceania Masters Athletics Council was elected in June 2024, and will stage the official Oceania Masters Championships in Brisbane from 6-10 September 2025.

== Championships ==
Edition	Year	Host city	Country	Dates
1	1982	Suva	Fiji	13 May – 17 May
2	1984	Canberra	Australia	April
3	1986	Apia	Samoa	5 September – 9 September
4	1988	Nouméa	New Caledonia	October
5	1990	Auckland	New Zealand	2 November – 6 November
6	1992	Norfolk Island	Australia	30 November – 6 December
7	1994	Suva	Fiji	1 July – 9 July
8	1996	Papeete	Tahiti	6 July – 13 July
9	1998	Hastings, New Zealand	New Zealand	January
10	2000	Norfolk Island	Australia	16 January – 22 January
11	2002	Geelong	Australia	January
12	2004	Rarotonga	Cook Islands	21 October – 27 October
13	2006	Christchurch	New Zealand	14 January – 21 January
14	2008	Townsville	Australia	27 July – 3 August
15	2010	Papeete	Tahiti	July
16	2012	Tauranga	New Zealand	5 February – 12 February
17	2014	Bendigo	Australia	4 January – 12 January
18	2015	Rarotonga	Cook Islands	5 October – 10 October
19	2018	Dunedin	New Zealand	20 January – 27 January
20	2019	Mackay, Queensland	Australia	31 August – 7 September
21	2022	Norfolk Island	Australia	Cancelled
22	2023	Saipan	Northern Mariana Islands	22–26 June
23	2024	Suva	Fiji	1–8 June
24	2025	Brisbane	Australia	6–10 September
