= Chip timing =

Technique for measuring sport event performance

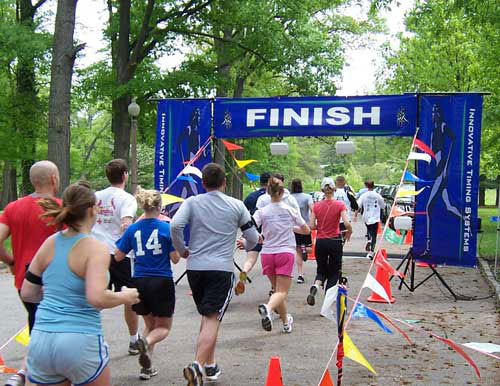
A Jaguar Timing System at a finish line using RFID technology with overhead antennas and passive, disposable chips

A ChronoTrack race controller with RFID antennas for detecting transponders attached to runner's shoes

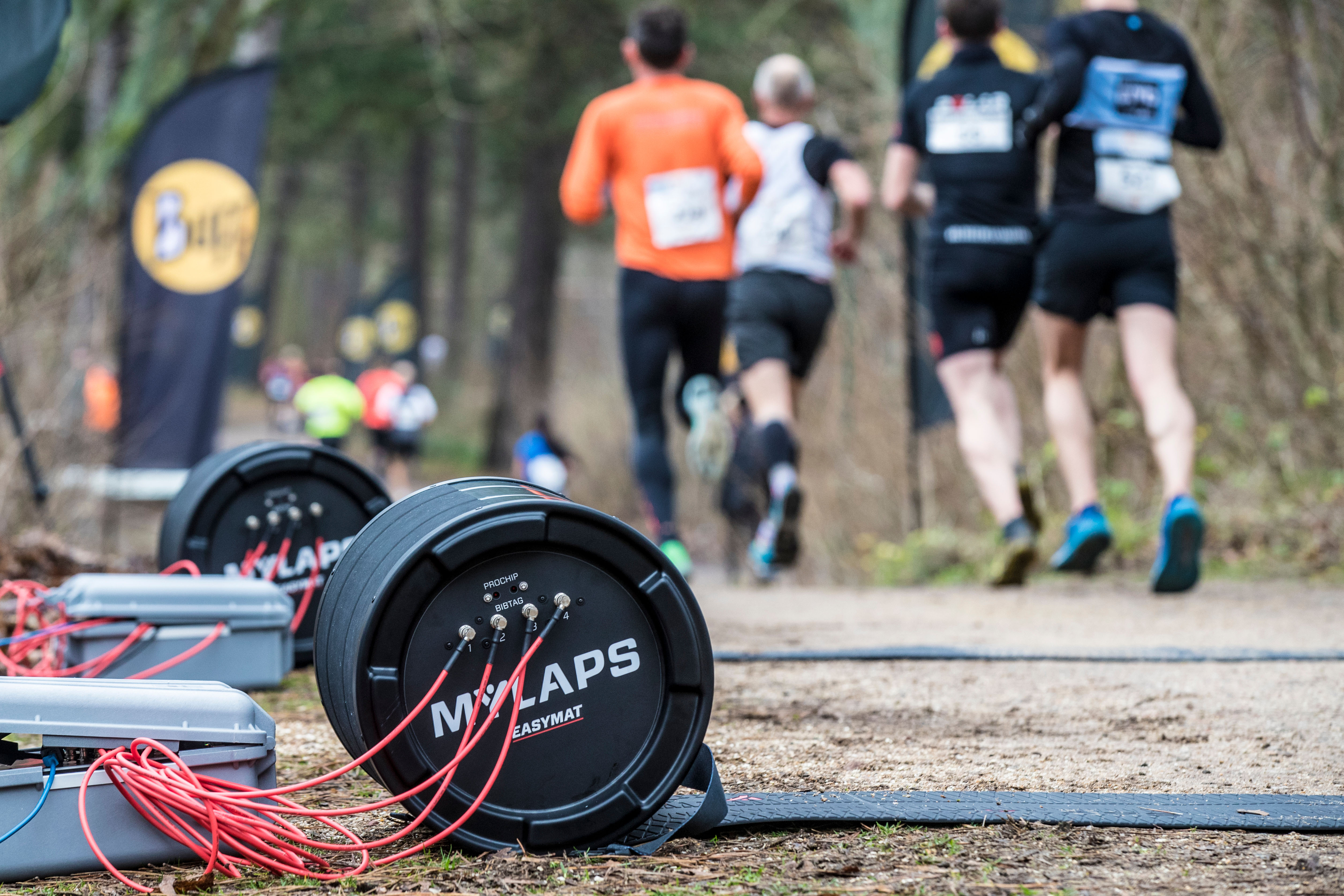
Runners passing RFID detection mats that are connected to decoders

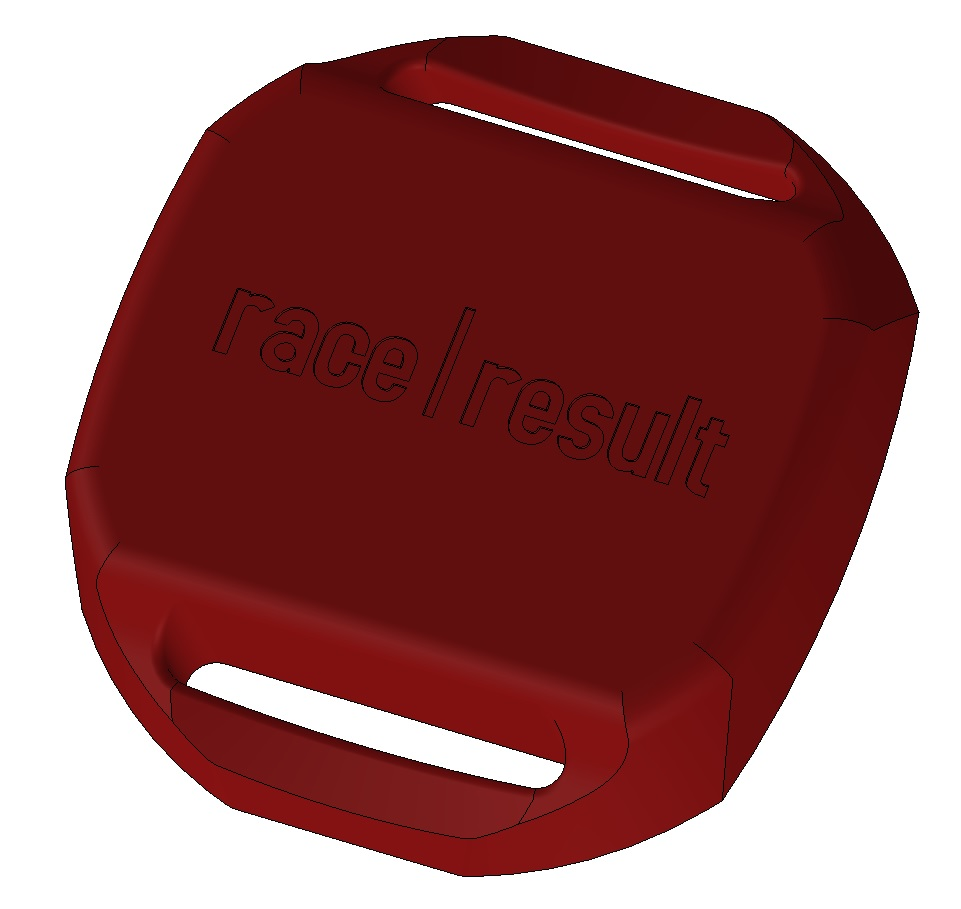
Active chip timing transponder

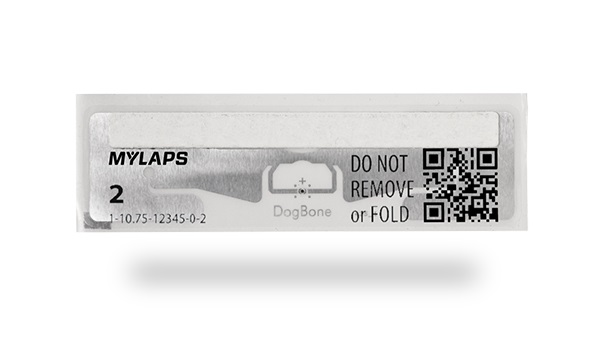
A passive tag to be used on the back of the bib

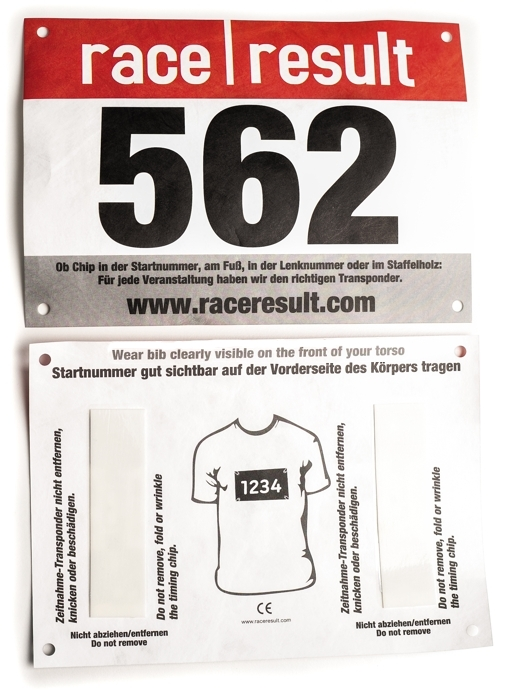
Disposable bib with two passive timing chips at the back

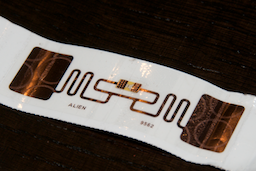
Back side of disposable RFID tag used for race timing

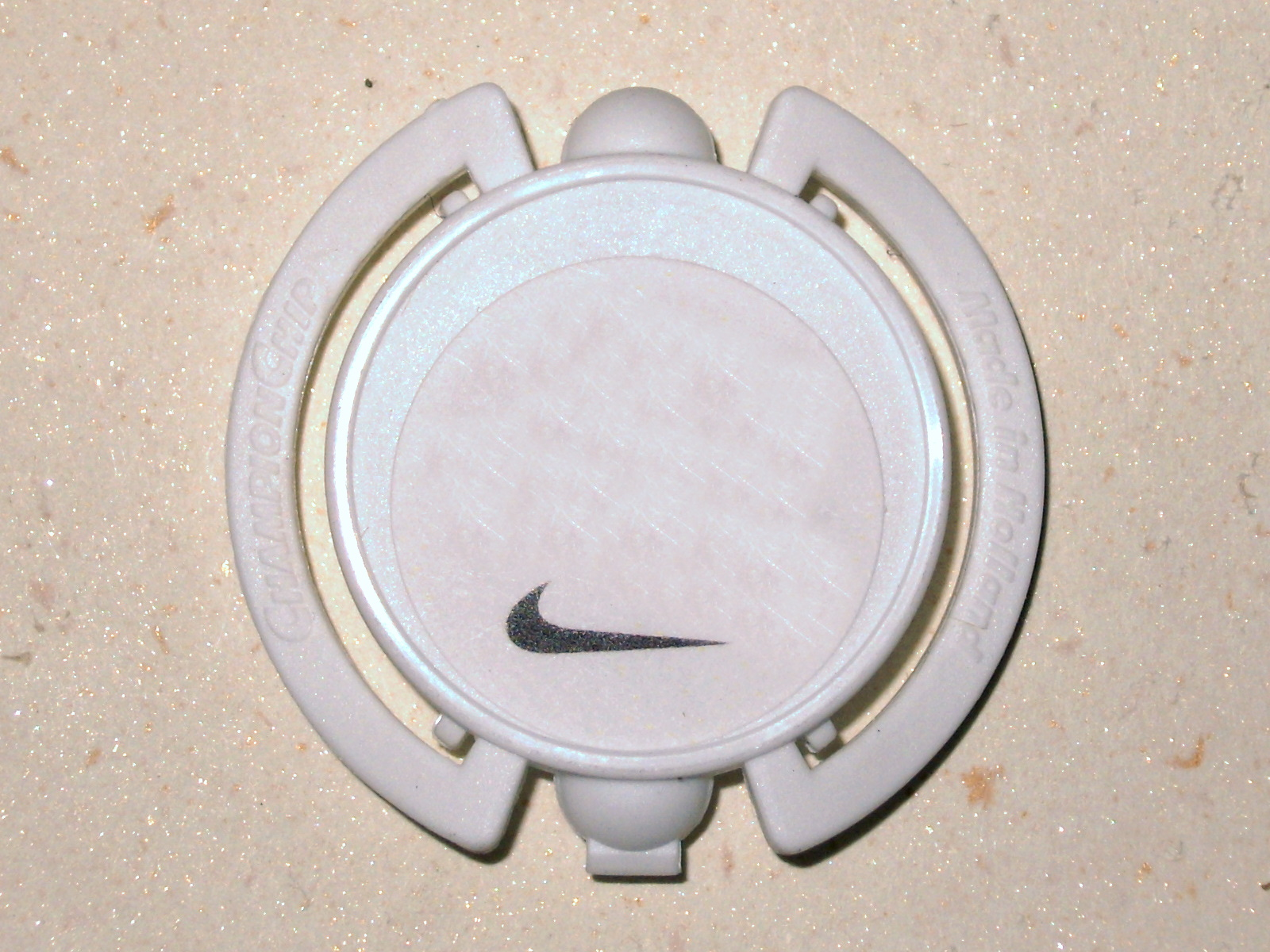
ChampionChip

Transponder timing (also called chip timing or RFID timing) is a technique for measuring performance in sport events. A transponder working on a radio-frequency identification (RFID) basis is attached to the athlete and emits a unique code that is detected by radio receivers located at the strategic points in an event.

Prior to the use of this technology, races were either timed by hand (with operators pressing a stopwatch) or using video camera systems.

== Transponder systems ==
Generally, there are three types of transponder timing systems: active, semi-passive, and passive. An active transponder consists of a battery-powered transceiver, connected to the athlete, that emits its unique code when it is interrogated. The transponder is active in that it has power on the return link. This is similar to how a cell phone operates.

A semi-passive system pre-energizes the integrated circuit within the transponder and powers the microprocessor with the return link as backscatter. This method allows for longer battery life than a true Active transponder.

A passive transponder does not contain a power source inside the transponder. Instead, the transponder captures electromagnetic energy produced by a nearby exciter and utilizes that energy to emit a unique code using backscatter technology.

In all three systems, an antenna is placed at the start, finish, and in some cases, intermediate time points, and is connected to a decoder. This decoder identifies the unique transponder code and calculates the exact time when the transponder passes a timing point. Some implementations of timing systems require the use of a mat on the ground at the timing points while other systems implement the timing points with vertically oriented side antenna portals.

== History ==
RFID was first used in the late 1980s primarily for motor racing and became more widely adopted in athletic events in the mid-1990s upon the release of low cost 134 kHz transponders and readers from Texas Instruments. This technology formed the basis of electronic sports timing for the world's largest running events as well as for cycling, triathlon and skiing. Some manufacturers made improvements to the technology to handle larger numbers of transponders in the read field or improve the tolerance of their systems to low-frequency noise. These low-frequency systems are still used a lot today. Other manufacturers developed their own proprietary RFID systems usually as an offshoot to more industrial applications. These latter systems attempted to get around the problem of reading large numbers of transponders in a read field by using the High Frequency 13.56 MHz RFID methodology that allowed transponders to use anti-collision algorithms to avoid tags interfering with each other's signal during the down-link between transponder and reader. Semi-passive transponder systems are able to use the microwave band popular with Bluetooth and Wi-Fi. Semi-passive systems costs are between passive and active systems. Active transponder systems continued to mature and despite their much higher cost they retained market share in the high speed sports like motor racing, cycling and ice skating. Active systems are also used at high-profile events such as the Olympics due to their very high read rates and time-stamping precision. By 2005 a newer RFID technology was becoming available, mostly for industrial applications. The first and second generation (UHF) transponders and readers that were being developed followed a strict protocol to ensure that multiple transponders and readers could be used between manufacturers. Much like the HF tags, the UHF tags were much cheaper to produce in volume and formed the basis in the next revolution in sports timing. Third generation UHF use unique antennas and software to time on a line rather than a vague radio lobe to increase timing accuracy. Currently, many of the largest athletic events are timed using disposable transponders either placed on the back of a race number or on the runner's shoe. The low cost meant that transponders were now fully disposable and did not need to be returned to the organizers after the event.

== Usage ==
Very large running events (more than 10,000) and triathlons were the first events to be transponder (or chip) timed because it is near impossible to manually time them. Also for large runs there are delays in participants reaching the start line, which penalize their performance. Some races place antennas or timing mats at both the start line and the finish line, which allow the exact net time to be calculated. Awards in a race are generally based on the "gun time" (which ignores any delay at the start) as per IAAF and USA Track and Field rules. However, some races use "net time" for presenting age group awards.

In the past the transponder was almost always worn on the athletes running shoe, or on an ankle band. This enabled the transponder to be read best on antenna mats because the distance between the transponder and readers antenna is minimized offering the best capture rate. Transponders may be threaded onto the shoe laces for running. For triathlon a soft elastic ankle band holds the transponder to the leg and care is taken to ensure the transponder is in the correct orientation or polarity for maximum read performance. Transponders have also been placed on the race bib. In the past 5 years the newer UHF systems use transponders placed on the shoe lace, or stuck to the race number bib. In both cases, care must be taken to ensure the UHF tag does not directly touch a large part of the skin as this affects read performance. Despite this, UHF Systems have read performances as good (if not better) than the conventional low and high frequency systems. Because these UHF tags are made in huge volumes for industrial applications, their price is much lower than that of conventional re-usable transponders and the race does not bother to collect them afterwards. As of 2015, many UHF timers use a combination of ground antennas with panel antenna(s) mounted on a tripod at the side of the race course.

Most RFID timing systems incorporate a box housing the reader(s) with peripherals like a microprocessor, serial or Ethernet communications and power source (battery). There are RFID systems that have all in one antenna designs without the need of separate detector boxes. These side antennas operate autonomously and do not need separate cables as there are no external components needed. . The traditional mat and side antenna system readers are attached by cables to one or more antennas that are designed for the particular operating frequency. In the case of low or medium frequencies these consist of wire loops incorporated into mats that cover the entire width of the timing point. For UHF systems the antennas consist of patch antennas that are protected in a matting system. The patch antennas may also be placed on stands, inside an all in one enclosure, or a finish gantry pointing towards the oncoming athlete. In most cases the distance between reader and antennas is restricted. Also more equipment is needed for events that require multiple timing points. Wider timing points require more readers and antennas. For active systems a simple wire loop is all that is needed since the transponder has its own power source and the loop serves as a trigger to turn on the transponder, then receive the relatively strong signal from the transponder. Therefore, side antenna and active systems need less readers (or decoders) per timing point width.

All systems utilize specialized software to calculate results and splits. This software usually resides on a separate PC computer that is connected to the readers via serial, Ethernet communications, data cellular, and Starlink. The software relates the raw transponder code and timestamp data to each entrant in a database and calculates gun and net times of runners, or the splits of a triathlete. In advanced systems these results are instantly calculated and published to the internet so that athletes and spectators have access to results via any web enabled device.
