= Asia Masters Athletics =

- Type: Masters athletics
- Purpose: athletic competition, senior sports
- Region served: Asia
- Website: asia-masters-athletics.com

Asia Masters Athletics (AMA) is one of six continental based regional affiliates of World Masters Athletics (WMA), the global governing body for the division of Masters Athletics.

The current president of the organization is Mr. Viwat Vigrantanoros, who represents the Sports Authority of Thailand. Mr. Sivapragasam Sivasambo, from Malaysia is the organization's secretary and is the representing delegate to the WMA General Meeting which is held in conjunction with the World Masters Athletics Championships. The past president was Mr. Kiyoshi Konoike, who is also the general secretary Japan Masters. Mr. Vigrantanoros previously had been vice president of Stadia.

The member nations of Asia Masters Athletics parallel those of the IAAF (the world governing body for the sport of athletics).

Asia Masters Athletics conducts the Asia Masters Athletics Championships, a biannual regional competition for all affiliated countries, held in opposite years from the World Masters Athletics Championships and conducts the site survey and selection for those championships. Also as a regional affiliate, Asia Masters Athletics is an intermediate validating step for all Masters Athletics World Records and for keeping the regional Asia Masters Athletics records.

== AMA Council Members 2023 - 2027 ==
Position	Name	Country
Honorary President	Datuk Seri (Dr.) V. Pulainthiran	Malaysia
President	Mr. Vivat Vigrantanoros	Thailand
Vice President (General Affairs)	Mr. Merari Nainggolan	Indonesia
Vice President (Stadia)	Mr. Kannan Arumugam	Singapore
Vice President (Non Stadia)	Ms. Wang Xiaoying	China
General Secretary	Mr. S. Sivapragasam	Malaysia
Treasurer	Mr. Prasert Srisueb	Thailand
Women's Committee	Ms. Kalaivalli R. Ratnam	Malaysia
Technical Member	Mr. Permsak Suriyachan	Thailand
Technical Member	Mr. Yao, Yi-Han	Taiwan
Technical Member	Mr. Musashi Sagara Nainggolan	Indonesia
Technical Member	Mr. Tadahiko Saito	Japan
Technical Member	Mr. Govindaraju Sinnappan	Singapore
Internal Auditor	Mr. Murali Subramaniam	Malaysia
Internal Auditor	Ms. Chantron Pimsakul	Thailand

== AMA Council Members 2019 - 2023 ==
Position	Name	Country
Patron	Mr. Kiyoshi Konoike	Japan
Honorary President	Datuk Seri (Dr.) V. Pulainthiran	Malaysia
President	Mr. Vivat Vigrantanoros	Thailand
Vice President (General Affairs)	Mr. Merari Nainggolan	Indonesia
Vice President (Stadia)	Mr. Kannan Arumugam	Singapore
Vice President (Non Stadia)	Ms. Wang Xiaoying	China
General Secretary	Mr. S. Sivapragasam	Malaysia
Treasurer	Mr. Prasert Srisueb	Thailand
Women's Committee	Ms. Kalaivalli R. Ratnam	Malaysia
Technical Member	Mr. Permsak Suriyachan	Thailand
Technical Member	Mr. Cho Hsin-Te	Taiwan
Technical Member	Mr. Musashi Sagara Nainggolan	Indonesia
Technical Member	Mr. Shinichi Uchida	Japan
Technical Member	Mr. H. A. Upali	Sri Lanka
Internal Auditor	Mr. Stanley Arumugam	Malaysia
Internal Auditor	Ms. Chantron Pimsakul	Thailand

== Asian Masters Athletics Championships ==
Edition	Year	Host City	Host Country	Countries	Participants
1	1981	Singapore	Singapore	8	408
2	1983	New Delhi	India	8	561
3	1985	Singapore	Singapore	11	372
4	1986	Jakarta	Indonesia	11	651
5	1988	Tainan	Taiwan	11	830
6	1990	Kuala Lumpur	Malaysia	13	1024
7	1992	Singapore	Singapore	14	1069
8	1994	Jakarta	Indonesia	14	945
9	1996	Seoul	South Korea	14	1259
10	1998	Okinawa	Japan	15	2502
11	2000	Bangalore	India	14	872
12	2002	Dalian	China	16	1660
13	2004	Bangkok	Thailand	17	1259
14	2006	Bangalore	India	17	1000
15	2009	Chiang Mai	Thailand	16	1100
16	2010	Kuala Lumpur	Malaysia	17	1753
17	2012	Taipei	Taiwan	17	1676
18	2014	Kitakami	Japan	24	2879
19	2016	Singapore	Singapore	25	1645
20	2017	Rugao	China	20	2074
21	2019	Kuching	Malaysia		
22	2023	Capas	Philippines		
23	2025	Chennai	India		
