= World Masters Athletics =

Governing body for participants over 35 years old

- WMA logo

- WAVA logo
- Predecessor: World Association of Veteran Athletes
- Founded: 1977
- Type: Masters athletics
- Purpose: athletic competition, senior sports
- Region served: Worldwide
- Website: world-masters-athletics.org

World Masters Athletics (WMA) is the worldwide governing body for the sport of masters athletics – which includes track and field, cross country, and road running events – as participated by people over 35 years of age.

As the need became apparent, the organization started under the name of World Association of Veteran Athletes (WAVA), founded August 9, 1977, at the second World Association of Veteran Athletes Championships in Gothenburg, Sweden. In 2001 the name was officially changed to World Masters Athletics and its championship is now called the World Masters Athletics Championships. The organization sanctions worldwide events, provides the age inspired specifications for rule modifications (a supplement to the rules of the sport by its worldwide governing body, World Athletics).

Prior to that, the sport was organized under the auspices of more localized bodies where the first official competitions were held, like the Interessen-Gemeinschaft Älterer Langstreckenläufer (IGÄL) formed in 1968 in Germany, British Veteran Athletic Club in Great Britain and the AAU in the United States. In 1972, the United States Masters International Track Team (USMITT) scheduled a tour of Great Britain and then Germany. to coincide with the 1972 Olympics in Munich. Those were the first deliberately scheduled international masters competitions for Track events. The World Veteran Long Distance Championships were already in existence as the older road runner was more common at that time.

At its founding, WAVA's mandate was initially to cover male athletes over the age of 40 and Female athletes over the age of 35. The younger women were invited to participate as their numbers were lower and it was observed younger wives might be excluded. The WMA World Outdoor Championships included the M35 division for the first time in 2005. The scope has also expanded from initially track and field competitions (called "stadia" within the organization), to include road running, race walking and cross country running events (called cumulatively "non-stadia", as these do not take place in a stadium).

World Masters Championships were first held outdoors in 1975, and continued biennially in odd years until 2015. They then switched to even years from 2016. The biennial World Masters Athletics Indoor Championships debuted in March 2004 in Sindelfingen, Germany, continuing in even years until 2014, then switching to odd years from 2017. The most recent outdoor world meet was in Málaga, Spain, from September 4–16, 2018. The most recent Indoor Championships were held in Toruń, Poland, from March 24–30, 2019. The 2020 championship was scheduled to take place in Toronto, but was cancelled due to the COVID-19 pandemic.

The first non-Stadia events were the World Road Running Championships in Birmingham, England in 1992 and has been held in even numbered years ever since.

WMA has been working to coordinate its outdoor championship schedule with the International Masters Games Association, which holds the multisport World Masters Games every four years.

Each individual country governs its own affairs with an organizational governing body that is an affiliate to WMA.

== World championships ==
Several world championship events are conducted by WMA. Some competitions are held as part of larger events – for example, the World Masters Athletics 100 km Championships have been conducted as part of the IAU World 100 Kilometres Challenge, with the exception of the first edition in 1998 which was held as a distinct event.

- World Masters Athletics Stadia Championships
- World Masters Athletics Indoor Championships
- World Masters Athletics Marathon Championship
- World Masters Athletics 100 km Championships
- World Masters Mountain Running Championships

== Regional championships ==
In addition to world championships, regional competitions are held in several major areas around the globe. These are usually biennual competitions held in alternation with the WMA Outdoor Championships.

- Africa
- Asia
- Europe
- North, Central American and Caribbean
- Oceania
- South America

== See also ==
- World Masters Athletics Championships
- Masters shot put

== Additional reading ==
- WAVA Newsletters (1980 to 1982)
- Veteris Magazine (1973 to 1979)
- New Zealand Vetline Magazine
- Current Masters World Records
- In the 1970s World Records started being kept, with Peter Mundle acting as Chair
