= List of European records in masters athletics =

These are the current European records in the various age groups of Masters athletics, maintained by European Masters Athletics (EMA), the European Association of Masters Athletes. Starting at age 35, each age group starts on the athlete's birthday in years that are evenly divisible by 5 and extends until the next such occurrence. For record purposes, older athletes are not included in younger age groups, except in the case of relay team members. A relay team's age group is determined by the age of the youngest member.

Some Masters events (hurdles, throwing implements) have modified specifications. The combined events use an age-graded result applied against the standard scoring table.

Key: Awaiting ratification Record not kept by EMA Not ratified by EMA Better indoor record

== Men ==
=== 100 metres ===
Age group	Record	Athlete	Nationality	Birthdate	Age	Date	Place	Meet	Ref.	Video
M 35	10.00 (+0.6 m/s)	Linford Christie	Great Britain	2 April 1960	35	15 September 1995	Tokyo, Japan	Toto International Super Meeting		
M 35	9.97 (+0.1 m/s) A	Linford Christie	Great Britain	2 April 1960	35	23 September 1995	Johannesburg, South Africa	AAA Johannesburg		
M 40	10.29 (+1.9 m/s)	Troy Douglas	Netherlands	30 November 1962	40	7 June 2003	Leiden, Netherlands	Leiden Gouden Spike		
M 45	10.72 (±0.0 m/s)	Lion Martinez	Sweden	26 January 1978	45	19 August 2023	Regensdorf, Switzerland	Abendmeeting Regensdorf		
M 50	11.13 (−0.3 m/s)	Mario Longo	Italy	21 August 1964	51	2 June 2016	Rome, Italy	Golden Gala		
M 55	11.46 (+0.8 m/s)	Darren Scott	Great Britain	7 March 1969	55	8 September 2024	Stratford, United Kingdom	Stratford Speed GP		
M 60	11.66 (+0.1 m/s)	Mario Longo	Italy	21 August 1964	60	5 July 2025	Nocera Inferiore, Italy	Regional Masters Championships		
M 65	12.03 (+0.6 m/s)	John Wright	Great Britain	15 June 1959	67	23 August 2026	Daegu, South Korea	World Masters Championships		
M 70	12.60 (+1.7 m/s)	Juan Carlos Rodriguez Diaz	Spain	8 October 1954	71	11 July 2026	A Coruña, Spain	Spain Final Masters Clubs Championships		
M 75	13.54 (+1.0 m/s)	Bruno Kimmel	Germany	3 March 1934	75	11 July 2009	Vaterstetten, Germany	Germany Masters Championships II		
M 80	14.31 (+0.9 m/s)	Hartmut Kraemer	Germany	19 March 1942	80	30 June 2022	Tampere, Finland	World Masters Championships		
M 85	15.89 (+0.5 m/s)	Karl Schmid	Germany	23 January 1938	85	29 June 2024	Aichach, Germany	Bavarian Masters Championships		
M 90	17.82 (+1.0 m/s)	Ugo Sansonetti	Italy	10 January 1919	90	1 August 2009	Lahti, Finland	World Masters Championships		
M 95	21.44 (+1.0 m/s)	Friedrich Mahlo	Germany	5 June 1912	95	7 September 2007	Riccione, Italy	World Masters Championships		
M 100	32.79 (−0.8 m/s)	Stanislaw Kowalski	Poland	14 April 1910	104	10 May 2014	Wrocław, Poland			
M 105	34.50 (−0.1 m/s)	Stanislaw Kowalski	Poland	14 April 1910	105	27 June 2015	Toruń, Poland	National Masters Championships		

=== 200 metres ===
Age group	Record	Athlete	Nationality	Birthdate	Age	Date	Place	Meet	Ref.
M 35	20.11 (+1.9 m/s)	Linford Christie	Great Britain	2 April 1960	35	25 June 1995	Villeneuve-d'Ascq, France	European Cup	
M 40	20.64 (+1.3 m/s)	Troy Douglas	Netherlands	30 November 1962	40	9 August 2003	Utrecht, Netherlands	Druppers Meeting	
M 40	20.64 (+0.7 m/s)	Troy Douglas	Netherlands	30 November 1962	40	27 August 2003	Paris, France	World Championships	
M 45	21.65 (±0.0 m/s)	Alexander Kosenkow	Germany	14 March 1977	45	23 July 2022	Minden, Germany	National Athletics Meeting	
M 50	22.58 (+0.9 m/s)	Stephen Peters	Great Britain	5 July 1953	50	6 July 2003	San Juan, Puerto Rico	World Masters Championships	
M 55	23.04 (+1.7 m/s)	Darren Scott	Great Britain	7 March 1969	55	8 September 2024	Stratford, United Kingdom	Stratford Speed GP	
M 60	24.00 (−0.3 m/s)	Ronald Taylor	Great Britain	4 December 1933	60	10 June 1994	Athens, Greece	European Masters Championships	
M 65	24.47 (+0.8 m/s)	John Wright	Great Britain	15 June 1959	66	23 August 2025	Sheffield, United Kingdom	Masters Grand Prix & Open	
M 70	25.87 (−0.8 m/s)	Gerhard Zorn	Germany	12 August 1956	70	15 August 2026	Dachau, Germany	Landesoffenes Volksfest	
M 75	27.97 (+1.5 m/s)	Wolfgang Reuter	Germany	12 August 1929	75	17 July 2005	Vaterstetten, Germany	Germany Masters Championships II	
M 80	29.78 (+0.8 m/s)	Friedhelm Adorf	Germany	25 September 1943	81	5 July 2025	Wassenberg, Germany	North Rhine-Westphalia Masters Championships	
M 85	34.24 (+0.2 m/s)	Ugo Sansonetti	Italy	10 January 1919	85	20 June 2004	Caorle, Italy	Italy Masters Championships	
M 90	39.14 (±0.0 m/s)	Otto Eric Nawrocki	Germany	29 April 1923	90	22 October 2013	Porto Alegre, Brazil	World Masters Championships	
M 95	48.69 (−1.5 m/s)	Friederich Ernst Mahlo	Germany	5 June 1912	95	10 September 2007	Riccione, Italy	World Masters Championships	
M 100									

=== 400 metres ===
Age group	Record	Athlete	Nationality	Birthdate	Age	Date	Place	Meet	Ref.
M 35	44.88	Liemarvin Bonevacia	Netherlands	5 April 1989	35	10 June 2024	Rome, Italy	European Championships	
M 40	47.81	Enrico Saraceni	Italy	19 May 1964	40	28 July 2004	Aarhus, Denmark	European Masters Championships	
M 45	48.55	Ricardo Menendez Gonzalez	Spain	26 August 1978	45	6 July 2024	Alcobendas, Spain	Spain Masters Championships	
M 50	50.51	Juan Luis Lopez Anaya	Spain	14 May 1970	51	16 July 2021	Granada, Spain	Control Extraordinario Granada	
M 55	51.86	Juan Luis Lopez Anaya	Spain	14 May 1970	55	28 June 2025	Nerja, Spain	Andalusian Championships	
M 60	53.93	Roland Groeger	Germany	7 August 1964	60	24 August 2024	Gothenburg, Sweden	World Masters Championships	
M 65	56.22	John Wright	Great Britain	15 June 1959	65	24 August 2024	Gothenburg, Sweden	World Masters Championships	
M 70	59.07	Gerhard Zorn	Germany	12 August 1956	70	1 September 2026	Daegu, South Korea	World Masters Championships	
M 75	1:02.40	Guido Müller	Germany	22 December 1938	75	28 June 2014	Elsenfeld, Germany	Bayern Regional Championships	
M 80	1:11.01	Roberto Paesani	Italy	9 August 1946	80	1 September 2026	Daegu, South Korea	World Masters Championships	
M 85	1:18.28	Jean Louis Esnault	France	19 January 1940	85	11 October 2025	Madeira, Portugal	European Masters Championships	
M 90	1:35.04	Ugo Sansonetti	Italy	10 January 1919	90	7 August 2009	Lahti, Finland	World Masters Championships	
M 95	2:21.46	Charles Eugster	Great Britain	26 July 1919	96	7 October 2015	Nice, France	European Masters Games	

=== 800 metres ===
Age group	Record	Athlete	Nationality	Birthdate	Age	Date	Place	Meet	Ref.
M 35	1:47.05	Manuel Olmedo	Spain	17 May 1983	38	3 June 2021	Huelva, Spain	16th Meeting Iberoamericano	
M 40	1:48.05	Anthony Whiteman	Great Britain	13 November 1971	42	12 July 2014	Stretford, United Kingdom	BMC Stretford Grand Prix	
M 45	1:49.86	Anthony Whiteman	Great Britain	13 November 1971	45	19 August 2017	Stretford, United Kingdom	BMC Stretford Grand Prix	
M 50	1:57.55	José Antonio Alcaraz Pérez	Spain	24 November 1975	50	8 February 2026	Alhama de Murcia, Spain	Region of Murcia Championships	
M 50	1:57.06	José Antonio Alcaraz Pérez	Spain	24 November 1975	50	17 June 2026	Valencia, Spain	1° Meeting 42K	
M 55	2:02.53	Andrew Larasen	Netherlands	23 September 1970	55	18 October 2025	Madeira, Portugal	European Masters Championships	
M 60	2:06.67	Andrew Ridley	Great Britain	24 July 1964	61	20 May 2026	Winchester, United Kingdom	WADAC Spring Evening Open	
M 65	2:13.74	Paul Forbes	Great Britain	20 November 1956	66	29 September 2023	Pescara, Italy	European Masters Championships	
M 70	2:21.54	Peteris Arents	Latvia	27 October 1953	70	28 July 2024	Valmiera, Latvia	Baltic Masters Championships	
M 75	2:30.59	Jose Vicente Rioseco Lopez	Spain	30 April 1941	75	18 June 2016	Vilagarcía, Spain	Galicia Masters Championships	
M 80	2:41.59	Jose Vicente Rioseco Lopez	Spain	30 April 1941	80	30 April 2021	A Coruña, Spain	Galicia Control de marcas	
M 85	2:59.50	Jean Louis Esnault	France	19 January 1940	85	5 July 2025	Issy Les Moulineaux, France	3° Meeting d'Issy Les Moulineaux	
M 90	4:04.85	Holger Josefsson	Sweden	4 October 1918	90	2 August 2009	Lahti, Finland	World Masters Championships	
M 90	3:36.83	Manuel Alonso Domingo	Spain	21 March 1936	90	28 June 2026	Madrid, Spain	Spanish Masters Championships	
M 95	4:51.44	Antonio Nacca	Italy	16 December 1923	95	9 June 2019	Asti, Italy	Italian Masters Clubs Championships Regional	

=== 1500 metres ===
Age group	Record	Athlete	Nationality	Birthdate	Age	Date	Place	Meet	Ref.
M35	3:32.96	Raphael Pallitsch	Austria	18 December 1989	35	24 June 2025	Ostrava, Czech Republic	Golden Spike Ostrava	
M40	3:42.02	Anthony Whiteman	Great Britain	13 November 1971	40	7 July 2012	Stretford, United Kingdom	BMC Grand Prix	
M 45	3:48.72	Anthony Whiteman	Great Britain	13 November 1971	45	8 July 2017	Loughborough, United Kingdom	BMC Grand Prix	
M 50	3:58.26	David Heath	Great Britain	22 May 1965	50	21 June 2015	Castres, France	Regional Championships	
M 55	4:14.33	Günter Heßelmann	Germany	3 August 1925	56	23 June 1981	Essen, Germany		
M 60	4:21.21	Andrew Ridley	Great Britain	24 July 1964	61	13 August 2025	Guilford, United Kingdom	Guildford Middle Distance Open	
M 65	4:39.15	Paul Forbes	Great Britain	20 November 1956	66	28 July 2023	Glasgow, United Kingdom	GAA Miler Meeting	
M 70	4:54.8 h	Peteris Arents	Latvia	27 October 1953	70	27 July 2024	Valmiera, Latvia	Baltic Masters Championships	
M 70	4:53.53 i	Cees Stolwijk	Netherlands	10 January 1950	70	1 February 2020	Apeldoorn, Netherlands		
M 75	5:11.05	Cees Stolwijk	Netherlands	10 January 1950	75	25 March 2025	Amersfoort, Netherlands	Keistad Baancompetitie 1500m	
M 80	5:30.89	Jose Vicente Rioseco Lopez	Spain	30 April 1941	80	19 June 2021	Málaga, Spain	Spanish Masters Championships	
M 85	6:08.61	Manuel Alonso Domingo	Spain	21 March 1936	85	19 June 2021	Málaga, Spain	Spanish Masters Championships	
M 90	7:12.71	Manuel Alonso Domingo	Spain	21 March 1936	90	11 July 2026	A Coruña, Spain	Spain Final Masters Clubs Championships	
M 95	10:14.31	Antonio Nacca	Italy	16 December 1923	95	8 June 2019	Asti, Italy	Italian Masters Clubs Championships Regional	

=== 3000 metres ===
Age group	Record	Athlete	Nationality	Birthdate	Age	Date	Place	Meet	Ref.
M 35	7:38.28	Abdellah Béhar	France	5 July 1963	35	29 July 1998	Paris, France	Meeting Gaz	
M 40	8:02.12	Janis Razgalis	Latvia	26 May 1985	40	16 August 2025	Leuven, Belgium	Meeting voor Mon	
M 45	8:15.58	Vyacheslav Shabunin	Russia	27 September 1969	45	15 July 2015	Moscow, Russia	Memorial Kuts	
M 50	8:37.94	Antoni Bernadó	Andorra	9 December 1966	51	14 July 2018	Granollers, Spain	XLIII Campeonato de España de Federaciones Autonómicas	
M 50	8:37.73 i	Juan Antonio Cuadrillero	Spain	6 October 1971	50	26 November 2021	Ourense, Spain	National Spain Masters indoor Championships	
M 55	8:55.93	Peter Van Der Velden	Netherlands	29 November 1968	55	27 July 2024	Leuven, Belgium	Meeting voor Mon	
M 55	8:47.71 i	Shane Healy	Ireland	5 October 1968	55	6 January 2024	Dublin, Ireland	National Indoor League R1	
M 60	9:29.47	Adriaan Heijdens	Netherlands	17 November 1938	61	27 June 2000	Etten-Leur, Netherlands		
M 65	9:49.5 h	Siem Herlaar	Netherlands	28 June 1929	65	21 July 1994	Alphen aan den Rijn, Netherlands		
M 70	10:36.54	Lucien Heyde	Belgium	11 April 1956	70	7 August 2026	Gentbrugge, Belgium	Vakantie Meeting	
M 75	10:58.7h (Note: by official result and WMA sources; 10:58.8 h by EMA source, probably a typo)	Cees Stolwijk	Netherlands	10 January 1950	75	28 August 2025	Breda, Netherlands	Ad Oomen Classic	
M 80	11:56.25+	Jose Vicente Rioseco Lopez	Spain	30 April 1941	80	4 September 2021	Pontevedra, Spain	Galicia Control de marcas	
M 85	14:09.66	Jean Louis Esnault	France	19 January 1940	85	9 July 2025	Chartres, France	Meeting Régional de Chartres	
M 90	18:36.0 h	Petter Green	Norway	24 March 1912	90	19 June 2002	Stjørdal, Norway		
M 90	18:07.84	Francesco Paderno	Italy	24 March 1935	90	6 April 2025	Vercelli, Italy	Meeting di Primavera	
M 95	22:46.4 h	Antonio Nacca	Italy	16 December 1923	95	16 December 2018	Novara, Italy	'Tre miglia d'oro' Meeting	

=== 5000 metres ===
Age group	Record	Athlete	Nationality	Birthdate	Age	Date	Place	Meet	Ref.
M 35	13:07.40	Dieter Baumann	Germany	9 February 1965	37	16 August 2002	Zürich, Switzerland	Weltklasse Zürich	
M 40	13:43.15	Mohamed Ezzher	France	26 April 1960	40	3 July 2000	Sotteville, France		
M 45	14:21.77	Said Boudalia	Italy	4 July 1968	45	29 September 2013	Rieti, Italy	Italian Clubs Championships	
M 50	14:53.2	David Martin Rees	Great Britain	28 February 1953	50	10 May 2003	Neath, United Kingdom	West Wales Championships	
M 55	15:32.29	Martin Fiz	Spain	3 March 1963	56	13 July 2019	Durango, Spain	Campeonato de Euskadi Absoluto	
M 55	15:21.54	Davide Figueiredo	Portugal	23 April 1971	55	15 July 2026	Braga, Portugal	III Noite Atlética	
M 60	16:12.57	Ad Heijdens	Netherlands	17 November 1938	60	3 July 1999	Uden, Netherlands	Keien Meeting	
M 65	16:36.59	Alastair Walker	Great Britain	25 May 1956	66	13 August 2022	Tullamore, Irland	Ireland Masters National Championships	
M 70	18:15.2	Lucien Heyde	Belgium	11 April 1956	70	8 July 2026	Ninove, Belgium	Avondmeeting	
M 70	18:09.41	Eddy Vierendeels	Belgium	7 November 1952	71	23 June 2024	Beveren, Belgium	Belgian Masters Championships	
M 75	18:50.07	Cees Stolwijk	Netherlands	10 January 1950	75	21 September 2025	Breda, Netherlands	Masters club competition final	
M 80	20:20.01	Jose Vicente Rioseco Lopez	Spain	30 April 1941	80	4 September 2021	Pontevedra, Spain	Galicia Control de marcas	
M 85	23:51.51	Fokke Kramer	Germany	13 April 1938	85	9 July 2023	Kiel, Germany	Regional Masters Championships SHLV/HLV/LVMV	
M 90	31:25.45	Gordon Porteous	Great Britain	20 February 1914	90	26 June 2004	Birmingham, United Kingdom	BMAF National Championships	
M 95	39:42.52	Antonio Nacca	Italy	16 December 1923	95	4 May 2019	Novara, Italy	Trofeo Dellomodarme	

=== 10,000 metres ===
Age group	Record	Athlete	Nationality	Birthdate	Age	Date	Place	Meet	Ref.
M 35	27:17.48	Carlos Lopes	Portugal	18 February 1947	37	2 July 1984	Stockholm, Sweden	DN Galan	
M 40	28:30.88	Martti Vainio	Finland	30 December 1950	40	25 June 1991	Hengelo, Netherlands	Fanny Blankers-Koen Games	
M 45	29:39.43	Mustafa Mohamed	Sweden	1 March 1979	45	27 July 2024	Uddevalla, Sweden	KP Games	
M 50	30:55.16	Peter De Vocht	Belgium	7 September 1960	50	8 September 2010	Tessenderlo, Belgium	Track Meeting Open	
M 55	32:15.2 h	Sergio Fernandez Infestas	Spain	30 July 1955	55	19 March 2011	Los Corrales de Buelna, Spain	Cantabria and Castilla and León Championship 10000	
M 55	31:48.05	Davide Figueiredo	Portugal	23 April 1971	55	1 May 2026	Lisbon, Portugal	National championships 10000m	
M 60	33:57.6	Michael Hager	Great Britain	6 September 1950	62	11 July 2013	Sandy, United Kingdom	Biggleswade Track Fest	
M 65	35:09.39	Alex Stienstra	Netherlands	6 July 1959	65	26 September 2024	Hengelo, Netherlands	Track meeting	
M 70	36:55.60	Eddy Vierendeels	Belgium	7 November 1952	70	8 May 2024	Leuven, Belgium	Belgian Masters Championships 10000m	
M 75	39:08.28	Cees Stolwijk	Netherlands	10 January 1950	75	25 September 2025	Hengelo, Netherlands	Trackmeeting LAAC	
M 80	46:10.5 h	Stephen Charlton	Great Britain	4 October 1926	80	8 August 2007	London, United Kingdom	Masters Meet 10000m	
M 80	45:05.8 h	Klemens Wittig	Germany	11 August 1937	80	11 October 2017	Wetter, Germany		
M 85	51:24.1 h	Stephen Charlton	Great Britain	4 October 1926	85	5 September 2012	Kingston upon Thames, United Kingdom	Masters Meet 10000m	
M 90	1:02:21.5 h	Alfred Althaus	Germany	17 November 1903	90	3 June 1994	Athens, Greece	European Masters Championships	

=== 10 km (road) ===
Age group	Record	Athlete	Nationality	Birthdate	Age	Date	Place	Meet	Ref.
M 35	27:39	Richard Ringer	Germany	27 February 1989	36	11 January 2026	Valencia, Spain	10K Valencia	
M 40	28:15	Serhiy Lebid	Ukraine	15 July 1975	40	20 September 2015	Lviv, Ukraine	Ukrainian 10 km Championships	
M 45	29:37	Driss Lakhouaja Allah	Spain	26 February 1972	46	31 December 2018	Barcelona, Spain	Cursa dels Nassos	
M 50	30:04	Juan Antonio Cuadrillero Barranco	Spain	6 October 1971	50	16 October 2021	Laredo, Spain	10 km Villa de Laredo	
M 55	31:40	Martín Fiz	Spain	3 March 1963	55	13 January 2019	Valencia, Spain	10K Valencia	
M 60	32:48	Martin Rees	Great Britain	28 February 1953	60	8 September 2013	Cardiff, United Kingdom	Cardiff 10k	
M 65	34:05	Alastair Walker	Great Britain	20 May 1956	66	16 April 2023	Grangemouth, United Kingdom	Round the Houses 10K	
M 70	37:17	Eddy Vierendeels	Belgium	7 November 1952	70	5 August 2023	Lokeren, Belgium	Belgian 10 km Championships	
M 75	39:31	Cees Stolwijk	Netherlands	10 January 1950	75	5 October 2025	Utrecht, Netherlands	Dutch 10 km Championships	
M 80	43:51	Jean-Claude Demarque	France	8 March 1946	80	29 March 2026	Dunkirk, France	Les Courses du Carnaval	

=== Half marathon ===
Age group	Record	Athlete	Nationality	Birthdate	Age	Date	Place	Meet	Ref.
M 35	1:00:01	Zerei Kbrom Mezngi	Norway	12 January 1986	36	18 September 2022	Copenhagen, Denmark	Copenhagen Half Marathon	
M 35	59:28 (Note: This time was later adjusted to 1:00:06, as it was found that the initially reported results were recorded 200 meters before the finish line.)	Bashir Abdi	Belgium	10 February 1989	37	8 March 2026	Gentbrugge, Belgium	National Championships Half Marathon	
M 35	59:07 a	Mo Farah	Great Britain	23 March 1983	36	8 September 2019	South Shields, United Kingdom	Great North Run	
M 40	59:53	Tadesse Abraham	Switzerland	12 August 1982	40	18 September 2022	Copenhagen, Denmark	Copenhagen Half Marathon	
M 45	1:05:21	Marcos Sanza	Andorra	14 January 1977	45	23 October 2022	Valencia, Spain	Valencia Half Marathon	
M 45	1:04:57	Alexandre Gonzalez	France	16 March 1951	45	17 March 1996	Auch, France	Seissan-Auch Half Marathon	
M 45	1:04:46 a	Aleksandras Antipovas	Lithuania	9 March 1955	45	12 March 2000	La Grande-Motte, France	Course des Pyramides	
M 50	1:06:17	Juan Antonio Cuadrillero	Spain	6 October 1971	50	24 October 2021	Valencia, Spain	Valencia Half Marathon	
M 55	1:09:44 (1:09:39c)	Joaquim Figueiredo	Portugal	17 February 1967	57	27 October 2024	Valencia, Spain	Valencia Half Marathon	
M 60	1:11:09	Tommy Hughes	Ireland	8 January 1960	60	12 September 2020	Larne, Ireland	Antrim Coast Half Marathon	
M 65	1:16:25	Wil van der Lee	Netherlands	23 October 1929	67	6 April 1997	Rosmalen, Netherlands		
M 70	1:19:33	Eddy Vierendeels	Belgium	7 November 1952	71	10 March 2024	Ghent, Belgium	Gent Half Marathon	
M 75	1:27:14 (1:27:10c)	Cees Stolwijk	Netherlands	10 January 1950	75	9 March 2025	Den Haag, Netherlands	Den Haag Half Marathon	
M 80	1:39:47 (1:39:43c)	Luciano Acquarone	Italy	4 October 1930	80	17 April 2011	San Benedetto del Tronto, Italy	Italian Half Marathon Masters Championships	
M 85	1:54:31	Giuseppe Damato	Italy	9 January 1936	86	27 March 2022	Turin, Italy	Turin Half Marathon	
M 90	2:07:36 (2:07.28c)	Giuseppe Damato	Italy	9 January 1936	90	19 April 2026	Turin, Italy	Turin Half Marathon	

=== Marathon ===
Age group	Record	Athlete	Nationality	Birthdate	Age	Date	Place	Meet	Ref.
M 35	2:03:47	Morhad Amdouni	France	21 June 1988	35	18 February 2024	Seville, Spain	Seville Marathon	
M 40	2:04:40	Tadesse Abraham	Switzerland	12 August 1982	42	1 December 2024	Valencia, Spain	Valencia Marathon	
M 45	2:15:51	Kjell-Erik Ståhl	Sweden	17 February 1946	45	29 September 1991	Berlin, Germany	Berlin Marathon	
M 50	2:22:14	Piet van Alphen	Netherlands	16 August 1930	52	9 April 1983	Rotterdam, Netherlands	Rotterdam Marathon	
M 55	2:25:56	Piet van Alphen	Netherlands	16 August 1930	55	19 April 1986	Rotterdam, Netherlands	Rotterdam Marathon	
M60	2:30:02	Tommy Hughes	Ireland	8 January 1960	60	25 October 2020	Lisburn, Ireland	Lisburn Festival of Running Marathon	
M60	2:28:28	Mohammed El Yamani	France	4 September 1964	61	15 February 2026	Seville, Spain	Seville Marathon	
M 65	2:42:22	Jean Rannou	France	24 April 1935	65	22 October 2000	Reims, France		
M 70	2:54:19	Jo Schoonbroodt	Netherlands	11 September 1950	71	8 May 2022	Visé, Belgium	Marathon de la Basse-Meuse	
M 75	3:07:07 (3:06:51c)	Cees Stolwijk	Netherlands	10 January 1950	75	13 April 2025	Rotterdam, Netherlands	Rotterdam Marathon	
M 80	3:39:10 (3:39:07c)	Juan López García	Spain	8 January 1944	80	13 October 2024	Bucharest, Romania	World Master Marathon Championships	
M 85	4:04:27 (3:57:48c)	Fokke Kramer	Germany	13 April 1938	85	23 April 2023	Hamburg, Germany	Hamburg Marathon	
M 90	4:35.14 (4:30.31c)	Giuseppe Damato	Italy	9 January 1936	90	12 April 2026	Milan, Italy	Milano Marathon	

=== 3000 metres steeplechase ===
Age group	Record	Athlete	Nationality	Birthdate	Age	Date	Place	Meet	Ref.
M 35	8:04.95	Simon Vroemen	Netherlands	11 May 1969	36	26 August 2005	Brussels, Belgium	Memorial Van Damme	
M 40	8:38.40	Angelo Carosi	Italy	20 January 1964	40	11 July 2004	Florence, Italy	Italian Championships	
M 45	9:16.1 h	Nils Undersåker	Norway	11 April 1939	45	12 September 1984	Ørsta, Norway		
M 50	9:28.24	Indrek Tobreluts	Estonia	5 April 1976	50	27 June 2026	Johvi, Estonia	Estonian Cup	
M 55	10:08.4 h	Cesar Perez Rodriguez	Spain	9 May 1957	55	13 May 2012	San Sebastián, Spain		

=== 2000 metres steeplechase ===
Age group	Record	Athlete	Nationality	Birthdate	Age	Date	Place	Meet	Ref.
M 60	6:48.46	Martien Van Der Hoorn	Netherlands	18 March 1953	61	5 June 2014	Barendrecht, Netherlands		
M 65	7:10.25	Francisco Aragon Munoz	Spain	17 November 1954	66	18 June 2021	Málaga, Spain	Spanish Masters Championships	
M 70	7:47.78	Francisco Aragon Munoz	Spain	17 November 1954	70	20 June 2025	La Nucia, Spain	Spanish Masters Championships	
M 75	8:29.26	Jose Vicente Rioseco Lopez	Spain	30 April 1941	78	28 June 2019	Sagunto, Spain	National Masters Championships	
M 80	10:36.12	Roger Godard	France	7 October 1945	80	11 October 2025	Madeira, Portugal	European Masters Championships	
M 85	13:12.99	Guntis Linde	Latvia	14 July 1928	89	31 July 2017	Aarhus, Denmark	European Masters Championships	

=== 110 metres hurdles ===
Age group	Record	Athlete	Nationality	Birthdate	Age	Date	Place	Meet	Ref.
M 35 1.06	13.11 (+0.4 m/s)	Colin Jackson	Great Britain	18 February 1967	35	10 August 2002	Munich, Germany	European Championships	
M 40 0.99	14.05 (+1.8 m/s)	Jan Schindzielorz	Germany	8 August 1978	41	26 July 2020	Regensburg, Germany	Sparkassen-Gala	
M 40 0.99	14.01 (+0.5 m/s)	Vincent Clarico	France	8 January 1966	40	21 June 2006	Elancourt, France	3° Meeting d'Elancourt	
M 45 0.99	14.26 (+0.3 m/s)	Jan Schindzielorz	Germany	8 August 1978	45	13 August 2023	Mönchengladbach, Germany	Germany Masters Championships	

=== 100 metres hurdles ===
Age group	Record	Athlete	Nationality	Birthdate	Age	Date	Place	Meet	Ref.
M 50 0.91	13.49 (+1.3 m/s)	Joe Appiah	Great Britain	26 October 1970	51	11 June 2022	London, United Kingdom		
M 55 0.91	13.75 (+1.2 m/s)	Joe Appiah	Great Britain	26 October 1970	55	9 August 2026	Stratford, United Kingdom	Stratford Speed GP4	
M 60 0.84	14.73 (−0.1 m/s)	Barrie Marsden	Great Britain	11 June 1964	61	31 May 2026	Woking, Great Britain	EMA London Masters International	
M 65 0.84	15.47 (+0.3 m/s)	Rolf Geese	Germany	19 February 1944	65	7 August 2009	Lahti, Finland	World Masters Championships	

=== 80 metres hurdles ===
Age group	Record	Athlete	Nationality	Birthdate	Age	Date	Place	Meet	Ref.
M 70 0.76	12.96 (+1.1 m/s)	Arno Hamaekers	Germany	1 May 1940	70	17 June 2010	Limburgerhof, Germany		
M 75 0.76	14.20 (+1.2 m/s)	Guido Müller	Germany	22 December 1938	76	15 August 2015	Lyon, France	World Masters Athletics Championships	
M 80 0.686	14.93 (+0.7 m/s)	Anthony Bowman	Great Britain	2 September 1935	80	30 July 2016	Birmingham, United Kingdom	BMAF Multiple Events Championships	
M 85 0.686	17.33 (−0.1 m/s)	Anthony Bowman	Great Britain	2 September 1935	85	8 June 2021	Stretford, United Kingdom	Trafford Sprints Grand Prix	
M 90 0.686	27.04 (+0.7 m/s)	Ilmari Koppinen	Finland	8 January 1918	91	7 August 2009	Lahti, Finland	World Masters Athletics Championships	

=== 300 metres hurdles ===
Age group	Record	Athlete	Nationality	Birthdate	Age	Date	Place	Meet	Ref.
M 60	42.31	Guido Müller	Germany	22 December 1938	60	1 August 1999	Gateshead, United Kingdom	WAVA Championships	
M 65	43.88	Guido Müller	Germany	22 December 1938	65	25 July 2004	Aarhus, Denmark	European Masters Championships	
M 70	45.24	Guido Müller	Germany	22 December 1938	70	10 July 2009	Vaterstetten, Germany	Germany Masters Championships	
M 75	49.65	Guido Müller	Germany	22 December 1938	75	12 July 2014	Erfurt, Germany	Germany Masters Championships	

=== 400 metres hurdles ===
Age group	Record	Athlete	Nationality	Birthdate	Age	Date	Place	Meet	Ref.
M 35	48.27	Yasmani Copello	Turkey	15 April 1987	35	1 July 2022	Oran, Algeria	Mediterranean Games	
M 40	50.55	Aramis Diaz	Italy	22 November 1974	40	6 June 2015	Geneve, Switzerland	Meeting EAP	
M 45	53.57	Aramis Diaz	Italy	22 November 1974	45	5 September 2020	Roma, Italy	Meeting 'Caccia al Minimo' 2	
M 50	55.99	Toine van Beckhoven	Netherlands	1 January 1970	53	21 May 2023	Eindhoven, Netherlands	Competitie Poule 4	
M 55	57.49	Toine van Beckhoven	Netherlands	1 January 1970	56	25 May 2026	Tilburg, Netherlands	Synchroon TMeeting	

=== 200 metres hurdles ===
Age group	Record	Athlete	Nationality	Birthdate	Age	Date	Place	Meet	Ref.
M 80	36.06 (+1.4 m/s)	John MacDermott	Ireland	12 March 1944	80	17 August 2024	Gothenburg, Sweden	World Masters Athletics Championships	
M 85	43.22 (−0.4 m/s)	Anthony Bowman	Great Britain	2 September 1935	85	6 June 2021	Nuneaton, United Kingdom	Midland Masters Championships	
M 90	1:21.99 (+0.5 m/s)	Anthony Bowman	Great Britain	2 September 1935	91	13 September 2026	Derby, United Kingdom	Great Britain Masters Championships	

=== High jump ===
Age group	Record	Athlete	Nationality	Birthdate	Age	Date	Place	Meet	Ref.
M 35	2.31	Dragutin Topić	Serbia	12 March 1971	38	28 July 2009	Kragujevac, Serbia	Serbian Senior meet	
M 40	2.28	Dragutin Topić	Serbia	12 March 1971	41	20 May 2012	Belgrade, Serbia	Serbian Clubs Championships	
M 45	2.04	Marco Segatel	Italy	23 March 1962	45	19 July 2007	Cernusco sul Naviglio, Italy	Regional Meeting	
M 50	1.98	Thomas Zacharias	Germany	2 January 1947	50	17 May 1997	Baunatal, Germany		
M 50	2.00 i	Thomas Zacharias	Germany	2 January 1947	50	2 March 1997	Birmingham, United Kingdom	European Masters Championships indoor	
M 55	1.91	Marco Segatel	Italy	23 March 1962	55	8 July 2017	Orvieto, Italy	Italian Masters Championships	
M 60	1.82	Rüdiger Weber	Germany	19 June 1963	60	16 June 2024	Erding, Germany	German Masters Championships	
M 65	1.68	Manfred Ziegler	Germany	19 December 1959	65	31 May 2025	Vohenstrauss, Germany	Kreismeisterschaften U14 open	
M 65	1.73 i	Oleg Fedorko	Ukraine	31 October 1954	66	9 February 2020	Kyiv, Ukraine	Ukrainia National Masters indoor Championships	
M 70	1.60	Dušan Prezelj	Slovenia	25 January 1949	71	22 July 2020	Ptuj, Slovenia	Masters Meet	
M 75	1.49	Carl-Erik Särndal	Sweden	17 July 1937	76	17 September 2013	Lund, Sweden	Sydsvenska Ungdomsspelen	
M 75	1.53 i	Dušan Prezelj	Slovenia	25 January 1949	75	2 March 2024	Zagreb, Croatia	Croatian Masters Open Indoor Championships	
M 80	1.38	Carl-Erik Särndal	Sweden	17 July 1937	80	20 August 2017	Karlskrona, Sweden	Swedish Masters Championships	
M 80	1.40 i	Carl-Erik Särndal	Sweden	17 July 1937	81	2 March 2019	Malmö, Sweden	Swedish Masters Championships indoor	
M 85	1.28	Carl-Erik Särndal	Sweden	17 July 1937	85	24 July 2022	Ystad, Sweden	Ystad Games	
M 90	1.07	André Guiomar	France	14 April 1933	90	26 September 2023	Pescara, Italy	European Masters Championships	
M 90	1.10	Emmerich Zensch	Austria	20 December 1919	90	26 June 2010	Vienna, Austria	Wiener Masters Championships	
M 90	1.15	André Guiomar	France	14 April 1933	90	24 June 2023	Laval, France	French Masters Championships	
M 95	1.00	Emmerich Zensch	Austria	20 December 1919	95	14 August 2015	Lyon, France	World Masters Championships	

=== Pole vault ===
Age group	Record	Athlete	Nationality	Birthdate	Age	Date	Place	Meet	Ref.
M 35	5.90	Björn Otto	Germany	16 October 1977	35	1 June 2013	Eugene, United States	Prefontaine Classic	
M 35	5.91 i	Renaud Lavillenie	France	18 September 1986	38	28 February 2025	Clermont-Ferrand, France	All Star Perche	
M 40	5.31	Oscar Janson	Sweden	22 July 1975	41	18 June 2017	Stockholm, Sweden	Stockholm Bauhaus Athletics	
M 45	5.25	Oscar Janson	Sweden	22 July 1975	47	13 August 2022	Mölndal, Sweden	Sky Is The Limit	
M 50	4.73	Wolfgang Ritte	Germany	7 January 1953	51	16 May 2004	Soest, Germany	Soester Pole vault meeting	
M 50	4.90 i	Jonas Asplund	Sweden	14 February 1973	53	31 March 2026	Toruń, Poland	European Indoor Masters Championships	
M 55	4.60	Wolfgang Ritte	Germany	7 January 1953	55	8 June 2008	Voerde, Germany	Pole vault meeting	
M 60	4.32	Wolfgang Ritte	Germany	7 January 1953	60	19 May 2013	Wipperfürth, Germany	Pole vault meeting	
M 65	4.05	Wolfgang Ritte	Germany	7 January 1953	65	19 May 2018	Wipperfürth, Germany	Pole vault meeting	
M 70	3.53	Wolfgang Ritte	Germany	7 January 1953	70	25 September 2023	Pescara, Italy	European Masters Championships	
M 70	3.56 i	Wolfgang Ritte	Germany	7 January 1953	70	31 March 2023	Toruń, Poland	World Masters Indoor Championships	
M 75	3.10	Neal Mason	Great Britain	15 May 1947	75	12 June 2022	Swindon, United Kingdom	Southern Athletics League Division 3 West	
M 80	2.73	Siegbert Gnoth	Germany	21 July 1940	80	31 October 2020	Nordkirchen, Germany	Final pole vault meet	
M 85	2.21	Siegbert Gnoth	Germany	21 July 1940	85	20 June 2026	Dülmen, Germany	Dülmen pole vault meeting	
M 90	1.62	Hermann Andrecs	Austria	21 February 1931	90	9 July 2021	Leibnitz, Austria	Masters Mini Meeting	
M 90	1.63	Hermann Andrecs	Austria	21 February 1931	90	25 September 2021	Linz, Austria	National Masters Championships	

=== Long jump ===
Age group	Record	Athlete	Nationality	Birthdate	Age	Date	Place	Meet	Ref.
M 35	8.35 (+1.0 m/s)	Salim Sdiri	France	26 October 1978	35	13 June 2014	Pierre-Bénite, France	Meeting National Envol	
M 40	7.77 (+1.8 m/s)	Kafetien Gomis	France	23 March 1980	41	5 June 2021	Pierre-Bénite, France	Meeting National Envol	
M 45	7.27 (+1.2 m/s)	Tapani Taavitsainen	Finland	17 June 1944	46	21 August 1990	Bern, Switzerland		
M 50	6.84 (+1.7 m/s)	Tapani Taavitsainen	Finland	17 June 1944	50	18 June 1994	Geneva, Switzerland		
M 55	6.50 (±0.0 m/s)	Gianni Becatti	Italy	27 August 1963	55	9 September 2018	Málaga, Spain	World Masters Championships	
M 60	6.18 (+2.0 m/s)	Gianni Becatti	Italy	27 August 1963	61	7 September 2024	Pietrasanta, Italy	Meeting Città di Pietrasanta	
M 65	5.54 (+0.4 m/s)	Stanisław Chmielewski	Poland	2 July 1959	66	5 July 2025	Gorzów, Poland	Poland Masters Championships	
M 70	5.15 (−0.6 m/s)	Wolfgang Reuter	Germany	12 August 1929	70	3 June 2000	Villach, Austria	Austria Masters Championships	
M 70	5.22 i	Vladimir Popov	Russia	3 July 1932	71	20 March 2004	Moscow, Russia	Russian Masters Championships indoor	
M 75	4.81 (±0.0 m/s)	Olle Borg	Sweden	1 October 1947	76	11 September 2024	Arvika, Sweden	Klubbtävling veteraner	
M 80	4.45 (+0.3 m/s)	Eberhard Linke	Germany	3 January 1944	80	30 May 2024	Kreuztal, Germany	FLVW Team Finale Senior/Seniorinnen	
M 80	4.45 (+1.1 m/s)	Eberhard Linke	Germany	3 January 1944	80	23 August 2024	Gothenburg, Sweden	World Masters Championships	
M 85	3.77 (+1.6 m/s)	Gudmund Skrivervik	Norway	18 January 1921	85	23 July 2006	Poznań, Poland	European Masters Championships	
M 90	3.06 (−0.4 m/s)	Vittorio Colò	Italy	9 November 1911	90	22 August 2002	Potsdam, Germany	European Masters Championships	
M 90	3.07 i	Aatos Sainio	Finland	7 June 1925	90	29 January 2016	Tampere, Finland		
M 95	2.15 (−0.4 m/s)	Emmerich Zensch	Austria	20 December 1919	85	12 August 2015	Lyon, France	World Masters Championships	
M 100	1.33 (+0.8 m/s)	Giuseppe Ottaviani	Italy	20 May 1916	100	30 May 2016	Urbino, Italy	Masters Meet	

=== Triple jump ===
Age group	Record	Athlete	Nationality	Birthdate	Age	Date	Place	Meet	Ref.
M 35	17.92 (+0.7 m/s)	Jonathan Edwards	Great Britain	10 May 1966	35	6 August 2001	Edmonton, Canada	World Championships	
M 40	17.32 (+1.1 m/s)	Fabrizio Donato	Italy	14 August 1976	40	9 June 2017	Pierre-Bénite, France	Meet Jumps	
M 45	15.13 (+0.2 m/s)	Wolfgang Knabe	Germany	12 July 1959	45	22 May 2005	Garbsen, Germany	FHDW Jumps Meet	
M 50	14.44 (+0.0 m/s)	Wolfgang Knabe	Germany	12 July 1959	50	18 July 2009	Lübeck, Germany	Norddeutsche Championships	
M 55	14.13 (+0.7 m/s)	Wolfgang Knabe	Germany	12 July 1959	55	28 August 2014	İzmir, Turkey	European Masters Championships	
M 60	12.82 (+0.2 m/s)	Wolfgang Knabe	Germany	12 July 1959	61	10 July 2021	Garbsen, Germany	NLV Jumps Cup	
M 65	12.16 (+1.1 m/s)	Wolfgang Knabe	Germany	12 July 1959	66	23 August 2025	Gotha, Germany	German Masters Championships	
M 70	10.77 (+1.0 m/s)	Arne Tefre	Norway	3 June 1955	70	19 October 2025	Madeira, Portugal	European Masters Championships	
M 70	10.88 i	Pertti Ahomäki	Finland	26 February 1946	70	2 April 2016	Ancona, Italy	European Masters Championships indoor	
M 75	10.12 (+1.6 m/s)	Olle Borg	Sweden	1 October 1947	76	12 September 2024	Arvika, Sweden	Klubbtävling veteraner	
M 80	9.29 (−0.1 m/s)	Eberhard Linke	Germany	3 January 1944	80	15 June 2024	Erding, Germany	German Masters Championships	
M 85	8.17 (+0.7 m/s)	Aatos Saino	Finland	7 June 1925	85	4 July 2010	Tampere, Finland	Finland Masters Outdoor Championships	
M 90	7.10 (+0.6 m/s)	Aatos Saino	Finland	7 June 1925	90	22 July 2015	Kangasala, Finland	Bruunon Games	
M 95	5.23 (+1.1 m/s)	Emmerich Zensch	Austria	20 December 1919	90	9 August 2015	Lyon, France	World Masters Championships	
M 95	5.31 i	Emmerich Zensch	Austria	20 December 1919	90	27 March 2015	Toruń, Poland	European Masters Championships indoor	
M 100	3.54 (+0.3 m/s)	Giuseppe Ottaviani	Italy	20 May 1916	100	30 May 2016	Urbino, Italy	Masters Meet	

=== Shot put ===
Age group	Record	Athlete	Nationality	Birthdate	Age	Date	Place	Meet	Ref.
M 35	21.35	Aleksandr Baryshnikov	Russia	11 November 1948	35	10 June 1984	Sochi, Russia	Znamensky Memorial	
M 40	20.44	Ivan Ivančić	Yugoslavia	6 December 1937	42	5 July 1980	Beograd, Serbia		
M 45	20.77	Ivan Ivančić	Yugoslavia	6 December 1937	45	31 August 1983	Koblenz, Germany	Rot Weiss meeting	
M 50	18.90	Andy Dittmar	Germany	5 July 1974	50	20 September 2025	Ohrdruf, Germany	Herbstsportfest des Ohrdrufer LV	
M 55	17.38	Klaus Liedtke	Germany	5 January 1941	55	22 June 1996	Gelsenkirchen, Germany		
M 55	17.57	Klaus Liedtke	Germany	5 January 1941	59	20 May 2000	Schwerte–Ergste, Germany		
M 60	18.37	Klaus Liedtke	Germany	5 January 1941	60	23 June 2001	Cologne, Germany		
M 65	15.90	Kurt Goldschmidt	Germany	9 March 1943	66	25 May 2009	Hamburg, Germany		
M 70	15.89	Karl-Heinz Marg	Germany	20 May 1938	70	12 July 2008	Schweinfurt, Germany	German Masters Championships	
M 75	14.24	Karl-Heinz Marg	Germany	20 May 1938	75	12 July 2013	Mönchengladbach, Germany	German Masters Championships	
M 75	14.48 i	Karl-Heinz Marg	Germany	20 May 1938	75	26 March 2014	Budapest, Hungary	European Masters Championships indoor	
M 80	13.98	Leo Saarinen	Finland	27 June 1929	80	15 August 2009	Kangasala, Finland	Finnish Masters Championships	
M 85	12.38	Roland Heiler	Germany	20 December 1938	85	14 June 2024	Erding, Germany	German Masters Championships	
M 85	12.50 i	Östen Edlund	Sweden	26 November 1934	85	11 January 2020	Sätra, Sweden	IVDM	
M 90	10.49	Östen Edlund	Sweden	26 November 1934	90	13 June 2025	Tingstäde, Sweden	Throws Pentathlon	
M 95	7.61	Toini Ahvenjärvi	Finland	25 June 1921	95	6 August 2016	Iisalmi, Finland	Finland Masters Championships	
M 100	5.50	Mario Riboni	Italy	13 June 1913	100	16 June 2013	Milan, Italy	Regional Masters Clubs Championships	
M 105	4.27	Stanisław Kowalski	Poland	10 April 1910	105	28 June 2015	Toruń, Poland	Poland Masters Championships	

=== Discus throw ===
Age group	Record	Athlete	Nationality	Birthdate	Age	Date	Place	Meet	Ref.
M 35	71.56	Virgilijus Alekna	Lithuania	13 February 1972	35	25 July 2007	Kaunas, Lithuania	Kaunas Permit Meeting	
M 40	70.28	Virgilijus Alekna	Lithuania	13 February 1972	40	23 June 2012	Klaipėda, Lithuania	Klaipėda Championships	
M 45	62.62	Pertti Hynni	Finland	14 February 1960	45	26 June 2005	Helsinki, Finland		
M 50	68.40	Klaus Weiffenbach	Germany	21 January 1945	52	10 May 1997	Medelby, Germany		
M 55	64.58	Klaus Liedtke	Germany	5 January 1941	59	8 October 2000	Medelby, Germany		
M 60	66.36	Klaus Liedtke	Germany	5 January 1941	60	19 May 2001	Schwerte–Ergste, Germany		
M 65	59.75	Klaus Liedtke	Germany	5 January 1941	66	17 August 2007	Oer-Erkenschwick, Germany		
M 70	55.27	Carmelo Rado	Italy	4 August 1933	70	30 September 2007	Chiuro, Italy	Regional Masters Championships	
M 75	49.21	Carmelo Rado	Italy	4 August 1933	75	5 October 2008	Besana in Brianza, Italy	Regional Masters Championships	
M 80	41.13	Östen Edlund	Sweden	26 November 1934	81	21 June 2016	Tingstade, Sweden	Throws Pentathlon Masters	
M 85	35.92	Carmelo Rado	Italy	4 August 1933	86	13 September 2019	Caorle, Italy	European Masters Championships	
M 90	28.08	Östen Edlund	Sweden	26 November 1934	90	17 October 2025	Madeira, Portugal	European Masters Championships	
M 95	17.62	Giuseppe Ottaviani	Italy	20 May 1916	95	21 May 2011	San Benedetto del Tronto, Italy	17° Adriatic Grand Prix Meeting	
M 100	10.27	Giuseppe Ottaviani	Italy	20 May 1916	100	18 June 2016	Montecassiano, Italy	Regional Masters Clubs Championships	
M 105	7.50	Stanisław Kowalski	Poland	10 April 1910	105	28 June 2015	Toruń, Poland	Poland National Championships	

=== Hammer throw ===
Age group	Record	Athlete	Nationality	Birthdate	Age	Date	Place	Meet	Ref.
M 35	83.62	Igor Astapkovich	Belarus	4 January 1963	35	20 June 1998	Minsk, Belarus	Memorial Klim	
M 40	82.23	Igor Astapkovich	Belarus	4 January 1963	41	10 July 2004	Minsk, Belarus		
M 45	79.42	Aleksandr Dryhol	Ukraine	25 April 1966	46	29 April 2012	Jablonec nad Nisou, Czech Republic	Throws Meet	
M 50	77.35	Aleksandr Dryhol	Israel	25 April 1966	53	6 July 2019	Dnipro, Ukraine	Ukrainian Summer Games	
M 55	63.89	Mariusz Walczak	Poland	27 February 1971	55	30 March 2026	Toruń, Poland	European Masters Indoor Championships	
M 55	65.97	Zoltan Fabian	Hungary	22 April 1969	55	23 June 2024	Maribor, Slovenia	Slovenia Masters Championships	
M 60	63.32	Arild Busterud	Norway	26 January 1948	60	28 July 2008	Ljubljana, Slovenia	European Masters Championships	
M 65	60.65	Arild Busterud	Norway	26 January 1948	65	23 July 2013	Tønsberg, Norway	Throws Meet	
M 70	56.72	Arild Busterud	Norway	26 January 1948	70	15 September 2018	Málaga, Spain	World Masters Championships	
M 70	57.42	Arild Busterud	Norway	26 January 1948	71	18 May 2019	Løten, Norway		
M 75	52.22	Arild Busterud	Norway	26 January 1948	75	29 April 2023	Tønsberg, Norway	Throws Pentathlon	
M 80	50.96	Heimo Viertbauer	Austria	6 November 1943	80	29 September 2024	Moosach, Germany	Moosach Throws series	
M 85	43.17	Walter Krifka	Austria	16 December 1936	85	18 June 2022	Linz, Austria	Voest Weight Pentathlon	
M 90	28.97	Lothar Huchthausen	Germany	13 March 1935	90	17 October 2025	Madeira, Portugal	European Masters Championships	
M 95	21.28	Zdenek Vasata	Czech Republic	26 May 1930	95	14 June 2025	Pardubice, Czech Republic	Czech Masters Championships	
M 100	8.36	Lauri Helle	Finland	1 May 1925	100	8 June 2025	Salo, Finland	Throws competition	

=== Javelin throw ===
Age group	Record	Athlete	Nationality	Birthdate	Age	Date	Place	Meet	Ref.
M 35	92.80	Jan Železný	Czech Republic	16 June 1966	35	12 August 2001	Edmonton, Canada	World Championships	
M 40	85.92	Jan Železný	Czech Republic	16 June 1966	40	9 August 2006	Gothenburg, Sweden	European Championships	
M 45	77.15	Peter Blank	Germany	10 April 1962	45	28 May 2007	Rehlingen, Germany	Pfingst Sportfest	
M 50	63.67	Carlo Sonego	Italy	20 February 1972	54	20 June 2026	Gorizia, Italy	Regional Masters Championships	
M 50	76.16 (old design)	Roald Bradstock	Great Britain	24 April 1962	50	2 June 2012	Clermont, United States	NTC Last Chance Meet	
M 55	52.35	Elliott Thijssen	Netherlands	30 March 1971	55	7 June 2026	Vught, Netherlands	Dutch Masters Championships	
M 55	66.76 (old design)	Roald Bradstock	Great Britain	24 April 1962	55	13 May 2017	Clermont, United States	NTC Sprint Elite Meet	
M 60	62.47	Esa Kiuru	Finland	14 April 1947	60	21 July 2007	Koria (Kouvola), Finland	Masters Meet	
M 65	58.58	Esa Kiuru	Finland	14 April 1947	65	27 May 2012	Helsinki, Finland		
M 70	54.47	Esa Kiuru	Finland	14 April 1947	74	10 July 2021	Orivesi, Finland	Orivesi Games	
M 75	52.15	Esa Kiuru	Finland	14 April 1947	75	22 August 2022	Mänttä-Vilppula, Finland	Masters Meet	
M 80	45.85	Jouni Tenhu	Finland	30 April 1939	80	9 September 2019	Caorle, Italy	European Masters Championships	
M 85	40.09	Jouni Tenhu	Finland	30 April 1939	85	19 August 2024	Gothenburg, Sweden	World Masters Championships	
M 85	41.36	Jouni Tenhu	Finland	30 April 1939	85	21 July 2024	Tallinn, Estonia	Estonia vs Finland Throws Meet	
M 90	27.45	Lothar Huchthausen	Germany	13 March 1935	90	17 October 2025	Madeira, Portugal	European Masters Championships	
M 95	15.53	Klaus Langer	Germany	15 July 1916	95	30 July 2011	Minden, Germany	Germany Masters Championships	
M 100	8.85	Helge Lönnroth	Finland	8 December 1916	100	8 July 2017	Lohja, Finland	Finland Masters Championships	
M 105	2.53	Alf Odd Dehlin Eriksen	Norway	18 July 1918	105	22 August 2023	Oslo, Norway	Masters Competition	

=== Weight throw ===
Age group	Record	Athlete	Nationality	Birthdate	Age	Date	Place	Meet	Ref.
M 35	25.17	Jüri Tamm	Estonia	5 February 1957	35	11 July 1992	Mäntyharju, Finland		
M 40	20.98	Ralf Jossa	Germany	2 November 1966	40	12 September 2007	Riccione, Italy	World Masters Championships	
M 45	20.79	Aleksandr Dryhol	Ukraine	25 April 1966	45	12 September 2011	Lignano Sabbiadoro, Italy	European Masters Games	
M 50	26.16	Aleksandr Dryhol	Israel	25 April 1966	53	7 July 2019	Dnipro, Ukraine	Ukrainian Summer Games	
M 55	23.03	Mariusz Walczak	Poland	27 February 1971	55	27 March 2026	Toruń, Poland	European Masters Indoor Championships	
M 60	24.20	Arild Busterud	Norway	26 January 1948	60	25 July 2008	Ljubljana, Slovenia	European Masters Championships	
M 65	22.10	Arild Busterud	Norway	26 January 1948	67	5 August 2015	Lyon, France	World Masters Championships	
M 70	23.15	Arild Busterud	Norway	26 January 1948	70	11 September 2018	Málaga, Spain	World Masters Championships	
M 75	20.93	Arild Busterud	Norway	26 January 1948	75	25 June 2023	Geithus, Norway	National Masters Championships	
M 75	20.99 i	Arild Busterud	Norway	26 January 1948	75	26 March 2023	Toruń, Poland	World Masters Championships	
M 80	20.01	Jerzy Jablowski	Poland	23 April 1945	80	24 August 2025	Warsaw, Poland	I Blekitny Miting Rzutowy Masters	
M 85	16.65	Carmelo Rado	Italy	4 August 1933	85	15 September 2018	Ancona, Italy	Regional Throws Pentathlon Championships	
M 85	17.14 (Note: not ratified due to irregular platform)	Walter Krifka	Austria	16 December 1936	85	2 July 2022	Tampere, Finland	World Masters Championships	
M 90	12.13	Östen Edlund	Sweden	26 November 1934	90	13 June 2025	Tingstäde, Sweden	Throws Pentathlon	
M 95	7.61	Lauri Helle	Finland	1 May 1925	95	13 July 2020	Helsinki, Finland	Throws competition (hammer and weight throw)	
M 100	5.27	Lauri Helle	Finland	1 May 1925	100	8 June 2025	Salo, Finland	Throws competition	

=== Pentathlon ===
Age group	Record	Athlete	Nationality	Birthdate	Age	Date	Place	Meet	Ref.
M 35	3956	Silvio Hodos	France	11 November 1947	35	17 April 1983	Paris, France		
M 35	Long jump (wind) / Javelin / 200m (wind) / Discus / 1500m; 6.59 m / 63.18 m / 23.6 / 46.54 m / 4:25.5								
M 40	3921 (old: 3937)	Mattias Sunneborn	Sweden	27 September 1970	40	15 June 2011	Sätra, Sweden		
M 40	Long jump (wind) / Javelin / 200m (wind) / Discus / 1500m; 7.14 m (+0.9 m/s) / 46.79 m / 22.06 (+2.3 m/s) / 37.52 m / 4:57.73								
M 45	3762 (old: 3820)	Thomas Stewens	Germany	10 September 1966	46	29 September 2012	Nieder-Olm, Germany		
M 45	Long jump (wind) / Javelin / 200m (wind) / Discus / 1500m; 6.13 m (±0.0 m/s) / 45.84 m / 24.84 (+0.8 m/s) / 35.85 m / 4:43.26								
M 50	3929 (old: 3951)	Mattias Sunneborn	Sweden	27 September 1970	50	16 July 2021	Visby, Sweden	Masters pentathlon competition	
M 50	Long jump (wind) / Javelin / 200m (wind) / Discus / 1500m; 6.37 m (−1.4 m/s) / 45.70 m / 23.45 (+2.8 m/s) / 35.48 m / 5.20.97								
M 55	4049 (old: 4102)	Thomas Stewens	Germany	10 September 1966	55	28–29 May 2022	Stendal, Germany	Stendaler Hanse-Cup	
M 55	Long jump (wind) / Javelin / 200m (wind) / Discus / 1500m; 5.41 m (+0.7 m/s) / 48.04 m / 26.16 (−0.8 m/s) / 39.69 m / 4:58.06								
M 60	4144	Dieter Bartzsch	Germany	12 October 1939	60	18 June 2000	Lage, Germany		
M 60	Long jump (wind) / Javelin / 200m (wind) / Discus / 1500m; 5.42 m (+1.5 m/s) / 48.25 m / 25.38 (+1.3 m/s) / 44.61 m / 5:43.85								
M 65	3853 (old: 4072)	Wim Threels	Netherlands	26 February 1952	68	27 September 2020	Stendal, Germany	Stendaler Hanse-Cup	
M 65	Long jump (wind) / Javelin / 200m (wind) / Discus / 1500m; 5.04 m (−0.2 m/s) / 38.47 m / 27.49 (+0.9 m/s) / 33.37 m / 5:40.12								
M 70	3827 (old: 4165)	Wim Threels	Netherlands	26 February 1952	70	29 May 2022	Stendal, Germany	Stendaler Hanse-Cup	
M 70	Long jump (wind) / Javelin / 200m (wind) / Discus / 1500m; 4.28 m (+0.9 m/s) / 38.96 m / 28.70 (−0.4 m/s) / 32.69 m / 5:43.77								
M 75	3493	Rolf Geese	Germany	19 February 1944	75	16 June 2019	Zella-Mehlis, Germany	German Masters Combined Events Championships	
M 75	Long jump (wind) / Javelin / 200m (wind) / Discus / 1500m; 3.95 m (−0.5 m/s) / 30.97 m / 30.47 (+1.7 m/s) / 31.37 m / 6:54.55								
M 80	3444	Basilius Balschalarski	Germany	15 January 1946	80	4 October 2026	Aichach, Germany	South German and Bavarian Masters Combined Events Championships	
M 80	Long jump (wind) / Javelin / 200m (wind) / Discus / 1500m; 3.62 m (+0.5 m/s) / 33.84 m / 34.65 (−0.3 m/s) / 32.01 m / 7:52.39								

=== Decathlon ===
Age group	Record	Athlete	Nationality	Birthdate	Age	Date	Place	Meet	Ref.
M 35	8511* (old: 8593*)	Lev Lobodin	Russia	1 April 1969	35	29–30 May 2004	Götzis, Austria	Hypo-Meeting	
M 35	100m (wind) / Long jump (wind) / Shot put / High jump / 400m / 110m H (wind) / Discus / Pole vault / Javelin / 1500m; 10.98 (+0.5 m/s) / 7.35 m (+0.6 m/s) / 15.21 m / 2.03 m / 49.59 / 14.20* (+0.3 m/s) / 46.03 m / 5.20 m / 53.43 m / 4:43.28; Note: * hs 1.06								
M 40	8028* (old: 8125*)	Attila Zsivoczky	Hungary	29 April 1977	42	4 August 2019	Budapest, Hungary	National Championships Multiple Events	
M 40	100m (wind) / Long jump (wind) / Shot put / High jump / 400m / 110m H (wind) / Discus / Pole vault / Javelin / 1500m; 11.70 (+0.3 m/s) / 6.25 m (+0.9 m/s) / 14.43 m / 2.02 m / 52.54 / 16.01* (−0.9 m/s) / 43.93 m / 4.20 m / 58.76 m / 4:51.38								
M 45	7551 (old: 7687)	Viktor Grouzenkin	Russia	19 December 1951	45	17 July 1997	Durban, South Africa	WAVA Championships	
M 45	100m (wind) / Long jump (wind) / Shot put / High jump / 400m / 110m H (wind) / Discus / Pole vault / Javelin / 1500m; 12.51 (−3.0 m/s) / 6.54 m (+4.6 m/s) / 13.24 m / 1.90 m / 57.10 / 16.66 (+0.2 m/s) / 37.40 m / 3.50 m / 50.30 m / 5:19.19								
M 50	8140 (old: 8247)	Mattias Sunneborn	Sweden	27 September 1970	50	21–22 August 2021	Copenhagen, Denmark	DM Multiple events	
M 50	100m (wind) / Long jump (wind) / Shot put / High jump / 400m / 110m H (wind) / Discus / Pole vault / Javelin / 1500m; 11.63 (+0.4 m/s) / 6.28 m (±0.0 m/s) / 12.88 m / 1.76 m / 51.67 / 14.79 (−1.9 m/s) / 38.93 m / 3.11 m / 47.99 m / 5:17.03								
M 55	8158 (old: 8325)	Thomas Stewens	Germany	10 September 1966	55	18–19 September 2021	Bad Nauheim, Germany	Jedermann-Zehnkampf	
M 55	100m (wind) / Long jump (wind) / Shot put / High jump / 400m / 100m H (wind) / Discus / Pole vault / Javelin / 1500m; 12.80 (+0.1 m/s) / 5.52 m (+0.8 m/s) / 13.27 m / 1.65 m / 57.01 / 15.41 (±0.0 m/s) / 32.45 m / 3.60 m / 46.05 m / 5:02.23								
M 55	8266e (old: 8425e)	Rolf Geese	Germany	19 February 1944	55	4 July 1999	Göttingen, Germany		
M 55	100m (wind) / Long jump (wind) / Shot put / High jump / 400m / 100m H (wind) / Discus / Pole vault / Javelin / 1500m; 12.41 (+0.7 m/s) / 5.66m (+1.2 m/s) / 11.59 m / 1.61 m / 56.21 / 15.1 h (+0.4 m/s) / 40.80 m / 3.62 m / 44.14 m* / 5:07.79; *Note: 800g javelin								
M 60	7801 (old: 8202)	Hubert Indra	Italy	24 March 1957	61	3 June 2018	Arezzo, Italy	Italian Masters Multiple Events Championships	
M 60	100m (wind) / Long jump (wind) / Shot put / High jump / 400m / 110m H (wind) / Discus / Pole vault / Javelin / 1500m; 13.62 (+0.8 m/s) / 4.83 m (+2.2 m/s) / 11.58 m / 1.66 m / 1:02.19 / 15.60 (+1.3 m/s) / 41.19 m / 3.80 m / 41.16 m / 5:42.63								
M 65	7780	Vytautas Zaniauskas	Lithuania	31 May 1960	65	11 October 2025	Madeira, Portugal	European Masters Championships	
M 65	100m (wind) / Long jump (wind) / Shot put / High jump / 400m / 110m H (wind) / Discus / Pole vault / Javelin / 1500m; 13.04 (−0.8 m/s) / 5.06 m (+0.5 m/s) / 11.54 m / 1.47 m / 1:05.20 / 15.83 (+2.3 m/s) / 40.30 m / 3.00 m / 32.78 m / 6:20.72								
M 65	7816	Vytautas Zaniauskas	Lithuania	31 May 1960	65	21 June 2025	Saint Renan, France	France Masters Championships	
M 65	100m (wind) / Long jump (wind) / Shot put / High jump / 400m / 110m H (wind) / Discus / Pole vault / Javelin / 1500m; 13.28 (−0.5 m/s) / 5.01 m (+3.1 m/s) / 11.59 m / 1.43 m / 1:02.85 / 15.56 (+0.7 m/s) / 38.47 m / 3.10 m / 32.10 m / 6:10.86								
M 70	7501 (old: 8142)	Valdis Cela	Latvia	1 February 1948	70	26–27 May 2018	Stendal, Germany	Stendaler Hanse-Cup	
M 70	100m (wind) / Long jump (wind) / Shot put / High jump / 400m / 80m H (wind) / Discus / Pole vault / Javelin / 1500m; 14.50 (+1.8 m/s) / 4.57 m (+0.0 m/s) / 10.64 m / 1.45 m / 1:10.53 / 14.27 (−0.1 m/s) / 30.55 m / 3.30 m / 33.84 m / 6:25.93								
M 75	7752 (old: 8538)	Rolf Geese	Germany	19 February 1944	75	2 June 2019	Stendal, Germany	Stendaler Hanse-Cup	
M 75	100m (wind) / Long jump (wind) / Shot put / High jump / 400m / 80m H (wind) / Discus / Pole vault / Javelin / 1500m; 14.64 (+0.9 m/s) / 4.10 m (±0.0 m/s) / 10.60 m / 1.28 m / 1:10.05 / 14.55 (−2.9 m/s) / 33.21 m / 2.80 m / 29.62 m / 6:30.47								
M 80	7221 (old: 8494)	Osmo Villanen	Finland	28 March 1936	80	19 July 2016	Aanekoski, Finland	Finland Masters Decathlon / Heptathlon Championships	
M 80	100m (wind) / Long jump (wind) / Shot put / High jump / 400m / 80m H (wind) / Discus / Pole vault / Javelin / 1500m; 16.26 (−0.5 m/s) / 3.83 m (+1.2 m/s) / 11.03 m / 1.27 m / 1:19.87 / 15.63 (+1.5 m/s) / 24.75 m / 2.40 m / 32.13 m / 7:53.82								
M 85	6401	Willi Klaus	Germany	6 November 1938	85	22 September 2024	Herzogenaurach, Germany	International Jedermann Multiple Events	
M 85	100m (wind) / Long jump (wind) / Shot put / High jump / 400m / 80m H (wind) / Discus / Pole vault / Javelin / 1500m; 17.76 (−2.0 m/s) / 3.39 m (+0.1 m/s) / 8.57 m / 1.19 m / 1:28.77 / 19.88 (−0.7 m/s) / 19.42 m / 2.00 m / 18.49 m / 8:05.66								

=== Throws pentathlon ===
Age group	Record	Athlete	Nationality	Birthdate	Age	Date	Place	Meet	Ref.
M 35	4128 (old 4133)	Olav Jenssen	Norway	11 May 1962	36	24 July 1999	Oslo, Norway		
M 35		Hammer / Shot put / Discus / Javelin / Weight; 51.23m / 15.78m / 60.80m / 47.92m / 16.75m							
M 40	4243 (old 4366)	Stephen Whyte	Great Britain	14 March 1964	41	3 September 2005	San Sebastián, Spain	World Masters Championships	
M 40		Hammer / Shot put / Discus / Javelin / Weight; 58.04m / 15.49m / 46.09m / 48.54m / 17.85m							
M 45	4421 (old 4616)	Iver Hytten	Norway	3 January 1966	46	28 April 2012	Tønsberg, Norway		
M 45		Hammer / Shot put / Discus / Javelin / Weight; 46.10m / 14.85m / 48.05m / 56.50m / 16.58m							
M 50	4553 (old 4696)	Norbert Demmel	Germany	10 May 1963	50	14 May 2016	Dingolfing, Germany		
M 50		Hammer / Shot put / Discus / Javelin / Weight; 52.51m / 16.18m / 55.66m / 50.10m / 18.78m							
M 55	4910 (old 5103)	Norbert Demmel	Germany	10 May 1963	55	14 September 2018	Málaga, Spain	World Masters Championships	
M 55		Hammer / Shot put / Discus / Javelin / Weight; 51.06m / 14.91m / 54.02m / 55.57m / 18.56m							
M 60	4726 (old 5034)	Norbert Demmel	Germany	10 May 1963	60	20 May 2023	Linz, Austria	3° VÖEST Throws Pentathlon	
M 60		Hammer / Shot put / Discus / Javelin / Weight; 51.94m / 15.05m / 59.62m / 40.50m / 21.86m							
M 65	4912 (old 5255)	Arild Busterud	Norway	26 January 1948	65	26 October 2013	Porto Alegre, Brazil	World Masters Championships	
M 65		Hammer / Shot put / Discus / Javelin / Weight; 57.70m / 14.46m / 50.43m / 32.87m / 21.54m							
M 70	4657 (old 5067)	Arild Busterud	Norway	26 January 1948	70	15 September 2018	Málaga, Spain	World Masters Championships	
M 70		Hammer / Shot put / Discus / Javelin / Weight; 56.72m / 14.22m / 43.35m / 29.71m / 21.52m							
M 75	4805 (old 5182)	Carmelo Rado	Italy	4 August 1933	75	26 October 2008	Biella, Italy	Throws Pentathlon Meeting	
M 75		Hammer / Shot put / Discus / Javelin / Weight; 44.93m / 12.86m / 43.77m / 35.90m / 17.80m							
M 80	4425 (old 5258)	Carmelo Rado	Italy	4 August 1933	80	8 September 2013	Aosta, Italy	Grand Prix Throws Pentathlon Masters	
M 80		Hammer / Shot put / Discus / Javelin / Weight; 38.08m / 12.49m / 39.46m / 30.60m / 17.92m							
M 80	4412 (old 5317)	Hermann Albrecht	Germany	6 April 1940	80	18 July 2020	Osnabrück, Germany	Masters Throws Pentathlon	
M 80		Hammer / Shot put / Discus / Javelin / Weight; 50.69 m / 11.92 m / 28.24 m / 32.52 m / 18.45 m							
M 85	4617 (old 5460)	Osten Edlund	Sweden	26 November 1934	85	19 September 2020	Sollentuna, Sweden	Masters Throws Pentathlon	
M 85		Hammer / Shot put / Discus / Javelin / Weight; 36.75m / 11.71m / 34.61m / 25.55m / 15.41m							
M 90	4238	Osten Edlund	Sweden	26 November 1934	90	6 July 2025	Tumba, Sweden	Masters Throws Pentathlon	
M 90		Hammer / Shot put / Discus / Javelin / Weight; 27.19 m / 9.92 m / 27.98 m / 20.18 m / 10.75 m							
M 95	3059 (old 3809)	Helge Lonnroth	Finland	8 December 1916	95	12 May 2012	Turku, Finland		
M 95		Hammer / Shot put / Discus / Javelin / Weight; 17.48m / 6.15m / 13.74m / 14.31m / 6.94m							
M 100	2453	Lauri Helle	Finland	1 May 1925	100	8 June 2025	Salo, Finland		
M 100		Hammer / Shot put / Discus / Javelin / Weight; 8.36m / 4.63m / 9.46m / 6.78m / 5.27m							

=== 5000 metres walk ===
Age group	Record	Athlete	Nationality	Birthdate	Age	Date	Place	Meet	Ref.
M 35	18:22.41	Yohann Diniz	France	1 January 1978	37	10 May 2015	Tourcoing, France	Interclubs Nord Brassage National	
M 40	18:57.13	Yohann Diniz	France	1 January 1978	40	20 May 2018	Reims, France	Championnat de France des clubs	
M 45	19:52.98	Joao Vieira	Portugal	20 February 1976	45	3 July 2021	Guimarães, Portugal	National Teams Championship	
M 50	21:42.20	Gilles Sahuc	France	23 May 1962	51	29 June 2013	Oyonnax, France		
M 50	21:35.62	Normund Ivzans	Latvia	7 November 1971	50	30 April 2022	Jēkabpils, Latvia	Meeting Open Jēkabpils	
M 55	22:27.93	Fabio Ruzzier	Slovenia	21 January 1953	56	23 August 2009	Zara, Croatia		
M 60	23:04.61	Graziano Morotti	Italy	15 January 1951	60	24 September 2011	Orvieto, Italy	Italian Clubs Championships	
M 65	24:13.10	Ian Richards	Great Britain	12 April 1948	65	18 October 2013	Porto Alegre, Brazil	World Masters Championships	
M 70	25:48.50	Ian Richards	Great Britain	12 April 1948	70	26 August 2018	Birmingham, United Kingdom	British Masters Championships	
M 75	27:40.0 h	James Grimwade	Great Britain	17 May 1912	75	28 June 1987	Solihull, United Kingdom		
M 80	29:24.1 h	James Grimwade	Great Britain	17 May 1912	80	7 June 1992	Solihull, United Kingdom	Midland Masters Championships	
M 85	35:49.1 h	George Mitchell	Great Britain	5 November 1914	85	11 June 2000	Solihull, United Kingdom	Midland Masters Championships	
M 85	33:53.32	Romolo Pelliccia	Italy	19 September 1936	86	6 May 2023	Perugia, Italy	Regional Clubs Championships	
M 90	41:04.37	Guenther Ciesielski	Germany	23 October 1926	90	31 July 2007	Aarhus, Denmark	European Masters Championships	
M 90	40:48.10	Karl Heinz Teufert	Germany	5 November 1929	90	22 August 2020	Langenhagen, Germany	Langenhagen Gehertag	
M 90	39:06.33	Romolo Pelliccia	Italy	19 September 1936	90	19 September 2026	Campi Bisenzio, Italy	Italian Masters Athletics Championships	
M 95	1h02:21.10	Viljo Hyvola	Finland	3 January 1929	95	5 July 2024	Oulu, Finland	Finland Masters Championships	

=== 10 km race walk ===
Age group	Record	Athlete	Nationality	Birthdate	Age	Date	Place	Meet	Ref.
M 35	38:20+	Yohann Diniz	France	1 January 1978	37	15 March 2015	Lugano, Switzerland	Memorial Albisetti	
M 35	38:39	Robert Korzeniowski	Poland	30 July 1968	35	12 June 2004	Kraków, Poland		
M 40	40:05+	Andriy Kovenko	Ukraine	25 November 1973	40	12 April 2014	Poděbrady, Czech Republic	International Race Walking Meeting	
M 40	40:44	Jesus Angel Garcia	Spain	17 October 1969	41	15 October 2011	Rome, Italy	Trofeo Fulvio Villa	
M 40	39:33	Andriy Kovenko	Ukraine	25 November 1973	40	28 June 2015	Lutsk, Ukraine	Ukrainian Cup	
M 45	40:44	João Vieira	Portugal	20 February 1976	47	17 June 2023	Borský Mikuláš, Slovakia	Záhorácka Dvadsiatka 2023	
M 50	44:12	Jesus Angel Garcia	Spain	17 October 1969	51	18 April 2021	Pamplona, Spain	Campeonato Navarro Marcha en ruta	
M 55	46:32	Graziano Morotti	Italy	15 January 1951	59	24 October 2010	Grottammare, Italy	National Walking Grand Prix	
M 60	47:39.4	Graziano Morotti	Italy	15 January 1951	60	13 March 2011	Almè, Italy	National Walking Grand Prix	
M 60	49:13	Gerhard Weidner	Germany	15 March 1933	63	28 April 1996	Naumburg, Germany		
M 65	51:01+	Gerhard Weidner	Germany	15 March 1933	65	23 May 1998	Naumburg, Germany	International walking competition	
M 70	53:32	Arthur Thomson	Great Britain	22 April 1936	70	26 April 2006	London, United Kingdom	Vets AC, Herts, Middlesex & Surrey Championships	
M 75	55:00.6	James Grimwade	Great Britain	17 May 1912	75	27 September 1987	Wolverhampton, United Kingdom	BVAF 10k track walk championships	
M 80	59:55	Romolo Pelliccia	Italy	19 September 1936	82	21 October 2018	Reggio Emilia, Italy	Italian Team Walk Championships	
M 85	1:12:12	Romolo Pelliccia	Italy	19 September 1936	87	26 September 2023	Pescara, Italy	European Masters Championships	
M 85	1:09:58	Romolo Pelliccia	Italy	19 September 1936	86	16 October 2022	Grottammare, Italy	Italian Team Walk Championships	
M 90	1:23:23	Guenther Ciesielski	Germany	23 October 1926	92	30 March 2019	Toruń, Poland	World Masters Championships indoor	

=== 20 km race walk ===
Age group	Record	Athlete	Nationality	Birthdate	Age	Date	Place	Meet	Ref.
M 35	1h17:02	Yohann Diniz	France	1 January 1978	37	8 March 2015	Arles, France	National Championship 20 km Walk	
M 40	1h20:20	Andriy Kovenko	Ukraine	25 November 1973	40	28 February 2014	Alushta, Ukraine	National Championship 20 km Walk	
M 45	1h21:40	João Vieira	Portugal	20 February 1976	45	5 June 2021	A Coruña, Spain	Gran Premio Internacional de Marcha Cantones	
M 50	1h30:01	Jorge Costa	Portugal	20 March 1961	50	9 April 2011	Rio Maior, Portugal	Grande Premio Internacional en March	
M 55	1h33:38	Graziano Morotti	Italy	15 January 1951	55	2 April 2006	Lugano, Switzerland	Gran Premio di Lugano	
M 60	1h37:46	Gerhard Weidner	Germany	15 March 1933	60	28 March 1993	Selze-Letter, Germany		
M 65	1h43:34	Gerhard Weidner	Germany	15 March 1933	65	23 May 1998	Naumburg, Germany	Internazional walking competition	
M 70	1h52:47	Arthur Thomson	Great Britain	22 April 1936	70	6 April 2008	Colchester, United Kingdom	UKA/RWA Championships	
M 75	1h56:19	James Grimwade	Great Britain	17 May 1912	75	29 November 1987	Melbourne, Australia	World Masters Athletics Championships	
M 80	2h04:49	James Grimwade	Great Britain	17 May 1912	80	20 June 1992	Sutton Coldfield, United Kingdom	20 km Walk British Masters Championship	
M 85	2h24:00	James Grimwade	Great Britain	17 May 1912	87	1 August 1999	Gateshead, United Kingdom	World Masters Athletics Championships	
M 90	3h11:00 (+)	Robert Schoukens	Belgium	27 May 1928	90	11 November 2018	Souilly, France		

=== 4 × 100 metres relay ===
Age group	Record	Athlete	Nationality	Birthdate	Age	Date	Place	Meet	Ref.
M 35	42.09	Samba Niangane, David Beaumont, Imad Rahoui, Michel Viallet	France	11 October 1975; 7 July 1979; 24 February 1980; 27 September 1979		16 August 2015	Lyon, France	World Masters Championships	
M 40	42.18	Jason Carty, Dominic Bradley, Mensah Elliott, Dwain Chambers	Great Britain	10 November 1969; 22 December 1976; 29 August 1976; 5 April 1978		19 August 2018	Lee Valley, United Kingdom	London Masters Grand Prix	
M 45	43.42	Alasdair Ross, Walwyn Franklyn, Viv Oliver, Stephen Peters	Great Britain	17 March 1952; 17 August 1952; 23 October 1951; 5 July 1953		8 August 1999	Gateshead, United Kingdom	WAVA Championships	
M 50	44.64	Francesco Di Leonardo, Andrea Portalatini, Claudio Fausti, Alessandro Lassi	Italy	18 August 1974; 28 December 1973; 5 February 1967; 29 April 1972		18 October 2025	Madeira, Portugal	European Masters Championships	
M 55	46.16	Walwyn Franklyn, Geoff Walcott, Alasdair Ross, Viv Oliver	Great Britain	17 August 1952; 10 April 1952; 17 March 1952; 23 October 1951		15 September 2007	Riccione, Italy	World Masters Athletics Championships	
M 60	48.16	Giancarlo D'Oro, Gianni Becatti, Alberto Zanelli, Paolo Mazzocconi	Italy	1962; 27 August 1963; 1965; 1964	62/63; 62; 60; 60/61	21 September 2025	Modena, Italy	Meeting CUS UniMORE	
M 65	49.22	Pat Logan, John Wright, Ricardo Huskisson, Andy Hunter	Great Britain	31 July 1960; 15 June 1959; 31 October 1959; 3 December 1959		18 October 2025	Madeira, Portugal	European Masters Championships	
M 70	53.03	Horst Schrader, Bruno Kimmel, Rudolf Böckl, Karl-Heinz Neumann	Germany	31 January 1935; 3 March 1934; 29 June 1934; 3 April 1935		3 September 2005	San Sebastián, Spain	World Masters Athletics Championships	
M 75	55.44	Hermann Beckering, Klaus Dieter Lange, Karl Schmid, Guido Müller	Germany	23 March 1939; 1 May 1939; 23 January 1938; 22 December 1938		31 August 2014	İzmir, Turkey	European Masters Athletics Championships	
M 80	61.83	Horst Albrecht, Gerhard Herbst, Kurt Schumacher, Rudolf Breder	Germany	14 July 1923; 14 January 1924; 5 July 1924; 17 March 1923		1 August 2004	Aarhus, Denmark	European Masters Athletics Championships	
M 85	1:08.78	Gerhard Adams, Klaus Dieter Lange, Karl Schmid, Willi Klaus	Germany	4 October 1937; 1 May 1939; 23 January 1938; 6 November 1938		17 August 2024	Gothenburg, Sweden	World Masters Athletics Championships	
M 90	1:27.37	Roberto Maiocchi, Francesco Paderno, Vincenzo Vanda, Remo Marchioni	Italy	31 October 1934; 24 March 1935; 15 March 1934; 30 September 1935		25 October 2025	Novara, Italy	1° Meeting Regionale di Staffetta	

=== 4 × 400 metres relay ===
Age group	Record	Athlete	Nationality	Birthdate	Date	Place	Meet	Ref.
M 35	3:16.53	Damaine Benjamin, Craig Cox, Lewis Robson, Dale Willis	Great Britain	12 March 1988; 27 January 1986; 9 January 1988; 17 June 1988	25 August 2024	Gothenburg, Sweden	World Masters Championships	
M 40	3:22.04	Octavio Perez Calatayud, Ramon Borente Gonzalez, Sergio Repiso Gutierrez, Ricardo Menendez Gonzalez	Spain	6 February 1978; 9 August 1978; 17 June 1978; 26 August 1978	16 September 2018	Málaga, Spain	World Masters Championships	
M 45	3:28.36	Douglas Lucas, Joseph Caines, Vivian Oliver, Alasdair Ross	Great Britain	31 July 1951; 9 January 1952; 23 October 1951; 17 March 1952	27 July 1997	Durban, South Africa	World Masters Championships	
M 50	3:33.68	Peter Wallin, Patrik Hägg, Mats Holmberg, Mattias Sunneborn	Sweden	1 April 1971; 9 May 1972; 17 April 1973; 27 September 1970	25 August 2024	Gothenburg, Sweden	World Masters Championships	
M 55	3:41.62	Toine van Beckhoven, Sjef Aertse, Marc van Gils, Andrew Larasen	Netherlands	1 January 1970; 1 October 1970; 5 June 1967; 23 September 1970	19 October 2025	Madeira, Portugal	European Masters Championships	
M 60	3:51.19	Ted Spitzer, Peter Oberließen, Rainer Strehle, Roland Gröger	Germany	3 September 1963; 29 December 1960; 12 February 1964; 7 August 1964	25 August 2024	Gothenburg, Sweden	World Masters Championships	
M 65	4:03.35	Richard White, Tennyson James, Stuart Lynn, John Wright	Great Britain	20 January 1960; 25 October 1957; 10 May 1960; 15 June 1959	19 October 2025	Madeira, Portugal	European Masters Championships	
M 70	4:17.47	Willi Scheidt, Adolf Nehren, Willi Klaus, Guido Müller	Germany	7 July 1939; 19 February 1939; 6 November 1938; 22 December 1938	8 August 2009	Lahti, Finland	World Masters Championships	
M 75	4:47.85	Karl Jakob, Willi Klaus, Dr. Hartmann Knorr, Guido Müller	Germany	2 October 1939; 6 November 1938; 21 March 1940; 22 December 1938	16 August 2015	Lyon, France	World Masters Championships	
M 80	5:48.16	Alfred Vossen, Heinz Hebermann, Werner Beecker, Herbert E.Müller	Germany	1931; 16 August 1931; 25 June 1932; 12 November 1929	28 September 2012	Essen, Germany		
M 85	6:53.22	Giancarlo Vecchi, Remo Marchioni, Benito Bertaggia, Francesco Paderno	Italy	24 April 1936; 30 September 1935; 5 April 1937; 24 March 1935	8 October 2022	Pistoia, Italy	Italian Masters Throws Pentathlon Championships	
M 90	8:17.56	Andrea Corvetti, Vincenzo Vanda, Remo Marchioni, Francesco Paderno	Italy	28 October 1932; 15 March 1934; 30 September 1935; 24 March 1935	25 October 2025	Novara, Italy	1° Meeting Regionale di Staffetta	

=== 4 × 800 metres relay ===
Age group	Record	Athlete	Nationality	Birthdate	Date	Place	Meet	Ref.
M 35	7:34.86	Harry Wakefield; David Scott; Matthew Revier; David Proctor	Great Britain	17 October 1989; 20 May 1988; 5 May 1989; 22 October 1985	24 August 2025	Bury, United Kingdom	BMC Meet	
M 40								
M 45	8:10.98	Pat Davis; David Locker; James Thie; Charlie Thurstan	Great Britain	14 December 1975; 28 March 1975; 27 June 1978; 11 February 1975	25 August 2023	Redditch, United Kingdom	Edgar Nicholls Open	
M 50	8:25.79	Gunnar Durén; Patrik Johansson; Mats Olsson; Per Björkman	Sweden	16 September 1963; 15 February 1965; 16 December 1965; 2 March 1965	20 August 2016	Upplands Väsby, Sweden	Väsbyspelen	
M 55	8:46.03	Stephen Allen; Andrew Ridley; Adrian Haines; Stephen Atkinson	Great Britain	18 January 1968; 24 July 1964; 21 April 1967; 4 April 1967	25 August 2023	Redditch, United Kingdom	Edgar Nicholls Open	
M 60	9:04.92	Robert McHarg; Rob Andrew; Andrew Ridley; David Clarke	Great Britain	12 January 1964; 28 May 1963; 24 July 1964; 6 November 1959	14 September 2024	Birmingham, United Kingdom	British Masters Pentathlon & 5000m Champs BMAF	
M 65	10:19.89	Cesar Perez Rodriguez; Rafael Ferrer Landa; Gorka Ruiz; Fidel Mujika	Spain	9 May 1957; 28 April 1955; 22 November 1956; 15 October 1956	12 June 2022	San Sebastián, Spain		
M 70	10:35.59	Graham Webster; Stewart Thorp; Derek Jackson; David Oxland	Great Britain	2 April 1952; 16 March 1952; 23 May 1951; 21 May 1951	9 July 2022	Birmingham, United Kingdom	University of Birmingham Track and Field Festival	
M 75	11:34.47	David Jones; Malcolm Weir; David Oxland; Derek Jackson	Great Britain	31 December 1949; 9 November 1946; 21 May 1951; 23 May 1951	15 August 2026	Redditch, United Kingdom	Edgar Nicholls Open	
M 80	14:01.14	Heinz Ebermann; Herbert Müller; Alfred Girault; Werner Beecker	Germany	16 August 1931; 12 November 1929; 15 September 1933; 25 June 1932	27 September 2013	Essen-Stoppenberg, Germany		
M 90	22:30.90	Andrea Corvetti, Vincenzo Vanda, Remo Marchioni, Francesco Paderno	Italy	28 October 1932; 15 March 1934; 30 September 1935; 24 March 1935	20 June 2026	Novara, Italy	Regional Meeting - 35° Trofeo Dellomodarme	

== Women ==
=== 100 metres women ===
Age group	Record	Athlete	Nationality	Birthdate	Age	Date	Place	Meet	Ref.
W 35	11.08 (+0.4 m/s)	Ivet Lalova-Collio	Bulgaria	18 May 1984	35	25 August 2019	Madrid, Spain	Madrid Meeting	
W 40	11.09 (+2.0 m/s)	Merlene Ottey	Slovenia	10 May 1960	44	3 August 2004	Naimette-Xhovémont, Belgium	Meeting International d'Athlétisme de la province de Liège	
W 40	10.99 (−1.2 m/s)	Merlene Ottey	Slovenia	10 May 1960	40	30 August 2000	Thessaloniki, Greece	Olympic Meeting Thessaloniki	
W 45	11.34 (+1.8 m/s)	Merlene Ottey	Slovenia	10 May 1960	48	12 August 2008	Glasgow, United Kingdom	Scottish National Championships	
W 50	11.67 (+0.9 m/s)	Merlene Ottey	Slovenia	10 May 1960	50	13 July 2010	Novo Mesto, Slovenia	Krka Meeting	
W 55	12.80 (+1.4 m/s)	Nicole Alexis	France	9 January 1960	55	20 June 2015	Ivry-sur-Seine, France	Regional Championships	
W 60	13.17 (+2.0 m/s)	Nicole Alexis	France	9 January 1960	62	28 May 2022	Antony, France	Championnat départemental	
W 60	13.05 (+1.0 m/s)	Nicole Alexis	France	9 January 1960	62	11 June 2022	Montgeron, France	Championnats d'ïle-de-France Senior	
W 65	13.73 (+0.7 m/s)	Nicole Alexis	France	9 January 1960	65	4 June 2025	Niort, France	Meeting de Niort	
W 70	14.73 (+1.4 m/s)	Ingrid Meier	Germany	1 April 1947	70	30 June 2017	Zittau, Germany	German Masters Championships	
W 75	15.87 (+1.1 m/s)	Barbro Boback	Sweden	15 May 1944	75	16 August 2019	Huddinge, Sweden	Sweden Masters Championships	
W 75	15.84 (±0.0 m/s)	Moira West	Great Britain	26 April 1949	75	27 July 2024	Derby, United Kingdom	BMAF Masters Championships	
W 80	16.31 (+1.3 m/s)	Barbro Boback	Sweden	15 May 1944	80	2 August 2024	Karlstad, Sweden	Swedish Masters Championships	
W 85	18.92 (+1.3 m/s)	Kathleen Stewart	Great Britain	7 August 1939	85	21 June 2025	Jarrow, United Kingdom	North East Masters AA	
W 90	23.18 (+0.7 m/s)	Nora Wedemo	Sweden	19 April 1913	90	9 August 2003	Eksjö, Sweden	Sweden Masters Championships	
W 95	30.16 (−0.6 m/s)	Elena Pagu	Romania	25 July 1926	95	28 August 2021	Bucharest Romania	National Masters Championships	

=== 200 metres women ===
Age group	Record	Athlete	Nationality	Birthdate	Age	Date	Place	Meet	Ref.
W 35	22.34 (+0.7 m/s)	Irina Khabarova	Russia	18 March 1966	38	31 July 2004	Tula, Russia	Russian Championships	
W 40	22.61 (+0.8 m/s)	Lorène Bazolo	Portugal	4 May 1983	42	29 June 2025	Madrid, Spain	European Team Championships	
W 45	23.82 (−0.2 m/s)	Merlene Ottey	Slovenia	10 May 1960	46	27 August 2006	Banská Bystrica, Slovakia	Athletic Bridge	
W 50	24.33 (+0.9 m/s)	Merlene Ottey	Slovenia	10 May 1960	50	18 July 2010	Velenje, Slovenia	Slovenia National Championships	
W 55	26.36 (+1.2 m/s)	Nicole Alexis	France	9 January 1960	55	28 June 2015	Nogent-sur-Marne, France	Meeting of Val de Marne	
W 60	27.30 (+1.8 m/s)	Iris Opitz	Germany	23 April 1966	60	19 July 2026	Mönchengladbach, Germany	Germany Masters Championships	
W 65	29.17 (+1.4 m/s)	Nicole Alexis	France	9 January 1960	65	8 May 2025	Saintes, France	Meeting de Saintes	
W 70	31.30 (+0.7 m/s)	Ingrid Meier	Germany	1 April 1947	70	2 July 2017	Zittau, Germany	Germany Masters Championships	
W 75	33.50 (+0.2 m/s)	Michelle Peroni-Edoh	France	7 August 1947	76	24 September 2023	Pescara, Italy	European Masters Championships	
W 75	33.30 (+0.8 m/s)	Moira West	Great Britain	26 April 1949	75	28 July 2024	Derby, United Kingdom	BMAF Masters Championships	
W 80	35.26 (−0.8 m/s)	Barbro Boback	Sweden	15 May 1944	80	3 August 2024	Karlstad, Sweden	Swedish Masters Championships	
W 85	40.93 (±0.0 m/s)	Kathleen Stewart	Great Britain	7 August 1939	86	20 June 2026	Jarrow, United Kingdom	North East Masters AA	
W 90	50.33 (+0.2 m/s)	Emma Mazzenga	Italy	1 August 1933	90	2 June 2024	Mestre, Italy	Regional Masters Championships	

=== 400 metres women ===
Age group	Record	Athlete	Nationality	Birthdate	Age	Date	Place	Meet	Ref.
W 35	50.80	Eleni Artymata	Cyprus	16 May 1986	35	4 August 2021	Tokyo, Japan	Olympic Games	
W 40	54.14	Aneta Lemiesz	Poland	17 January 1981	40	12 September 2021	Berlin, Germany	ISTAF	
W 40	53.6h	Sonja Keil	Germany	12 June 1985	80	29 June 2025	Sankt Wendel, Germany	South German Championships	
W 45	57.49	Susan McLoughlin	Great Britain	2 June 1977	45	8 July 2022	Tampere, Finland	World Masters Championships	
W 50	57.55	Sally Cooke	Great Britain	9 April 1970	52	12 June 2022	Derby, United Kingdom	British Masters Championships	
W 55	1:00.07	Esther Colas Roman	Spain	7 May 1967	55	8 July 2022	Tampere, Finland	World Masters Championships	
W 60	1:04.31	Caroline Powell	Great Britain	21 December 1953	61	12 August 2015	Lyon, France	World Masters Championships	
W 60	1:02.69	Barbara Gähling	Germany	20 January 1965	61	19 July 2026	Mönchengladbach, Germany	German Masters Championships	
W 65	1:07.78	Edel Maguire	Ireland	3 July 1959	67	2 September 2026	Daegu, South Korea	World Masters Championships	
W 70	1:13.12	Caroline Powell	Great Britain	21 December 1953	72	28 June 2026	Yate, Great Britain	Yate Masters Open 2026	
W 75	1:15.21	Michelle Peroni-Edoh	France	7 August 1947	75	24 June 2023	Laval, France	French Masters Championships	
W 80	1:29.84	Rietje Dijkman	Netherlands	21 June 1939	80	9 September 2019	Caorle, Italy	European Masters Championships	
W 80	1:29.42	Riet Jonkers Slegers	Netherlands	4 October 1943	80	1 September 2024	Dongen, Netherlands	Atledo Back on Trackmeeting	
W 85	1:37.34	Kathleen Stewart	Great Britain	7 August 1939	85	21 June 2025	Jarrow, United Kingdom	North East Masters AA	
W 90	2:16.19	Melitta Czerwenka-Nagel	Germany	30 April 1930	90	14 September 2020	Saarlouis, Germany	Sprinterabend des LAC Saarlouis	
W 95	4:00.49	Angela Munoz Fernandez	Spain	7 February 1929	95	12 May 2024	Mostoles, Spain	Trofeo Velocidad	

=== 800 metres women ===
Age group	Record	Athlete	Nationality	Birthdate	Age	Date	Place	Meet	Ref.
W 35	1:56.53	Lyubov Gurina	Russia	6 August 1957	36	30 July 1994	Hechtel, Belgium	Night of Athletics	
W 40	1:59.25	Yekaterina Podkopayeva	Russia	11 June 1952	42	30 June 1994	Luxembourg, Luxembourg		
W 45	2:02.82	Yekaterina Podkopayeva	Russia	11 June 1952	46	26 June 1998	Moscow, Russia	Russia Junior Open Championships	
W 50	2:12.49	Eva Trost	Germany	30 January 1968	50	3 August 2018	Neustadt, Germany	Neustadter Laufermeeting	
W 55	2:19.63	Anne Gilshinan	Ireland	6 April 1964	55	8 June 2019	Leixlip, Ireland	Le Chéile International	
W 60	2:26.02	Anne Gilshinan	Ireland	6 April 1964	61	18 October 2025	Madeira, Portugal	European Masters Championships	
W 65	2:40.65	Karen Brooks	Great Britain	20 May 1959	65	7 September 2024	Corby, England	England Masters Inter-Area Challenge	
W 70	2:50.22	Alison Bourgeois	Switzerland	30 April 1953	70	24 June 2023	Laval, France	France Masters Championships	
W 75	2:58.12	Sarah Roberts	Great Britain	6 October 1949	75	5 May 2025	Stevenage, United Kingdom	Hertfordshire County Championships	
W 75	2:57.32 i	Sarah Roberts	Great Britain	6 October 1949	75	22 February 2025	London, United Kingdom	British Masters Championships	
W 80	3:25.80	Yolande Marchal	France	10 September 1939	81	10 October 2020	Chalon-sur-Saône, France	France Masters Championships	
W 80	3:18.74 i	Yolande Marchal	France	10 September 1939	80	11 January 2020	Miramas, France	Pré Régionaux Individuels en salle	
W 85	3:36.14	Yolande Marchal	France	10 September 1939	85	30 May 2025	Cannes, France	Championnats Départementaux	
W 90	5:01.35	Melitta Czerwenka-Nagel	Germany	30 April 1930	90	30 September 2020	Pfungstadt, Germany	Pfungstädter Abendsportfest	

=== 1500 metres women ===
Age group	Record	Athlete	Nationality	Birthdate	Age	Date	Place	Meet	Ref.
W 35	3:57.73	Maricica Puica	Romania	29 July 1950	35	30 August 1985	Brussels, Belgium	Memorial Van Damme	
W 40	3:59.78	Yekaterina Podkopayeva	Russia	11 June 1952	42	18 July 1994	Nice, France	Nikaia Meeting Grand Prix	
W 45	4:05.44	Yekaterina Podkopayeva	Russia	11 June 1952	46	3 August 1998	Moscow, Russia	Russian Championships	
W 50	4:35.40	Nicole Weijling-Dissel	Netherlands	16 June 1967	50	11 August 2017	Utrecht, Netherlands	Utrecht Four Track meeting	
W 55	4:41.46	Anne Gilshinan	Ireland	6 April 1964	55	22 June 2019	Belfast, Ireland	Irish Milers Meet	
W 60	4:56.09+	Clare Elms	Great Britain	26 December 1963	62	22 July 2026	Wimbledon, United Kingdom	Dave Clarke Mile	
W 65	5:30.54	Karen Brooks	Great Britain	20 May 1959	65	27 July 2024	Derby, United Kingdom	BMAF Masters Championships	
W 65	5:26.19	Maryse Le Gallo	France	27 April 1960	65	31 May 2025	Auray, France	Meeting du Cima Pays d'Auray	
W 65	5:23.36	Maryse Le Gallo	France	27 April 1960	65	20 June 2025	Saint-Renan, France	France Masters Championships	
W 70	5:46.9 h	Angela Copson	Great Britain	20 April 1947	70	4 June 2017	Nuneaton, United Kingdom	Midland Masters Championships	
W 75	5:59.45	Sarah Roberts	Great Britain	6 October 1949	75	21 September 2025	Hemel Hempstead, United Kingdom	Dacorum AC Club Champs	
W 75	5:58.15 i	Sarah Roberts	Great Britain	6 October 1949	75	23 February 2025	London, United Kingdom	British Masters Championships	
W 80	7:09.59	Yolande Marchal	France	10 September 1939	81	11 October 2020	Chalon-sur-Saône, France	France Masters Championships	
W 80	6:58.30 i	Yolande Marchal	France	10 September 1939	80	12 January 2020	Miramas, France	Pré Régionaux Individuels en salle	
W 85	8:50.42	Melitta Czerwenka-Nagel	Germany	30 April 1930	85	14 August 2015	Lyon, France	World Masters Championships	
W 85	7:37.27 i	Yolande Marchal	France	10 September 1939	85	7 March 2025	Miramas, France	France Masters Indoor Championships	
W 90	11:38.34 i	Melitta Czerwenka-Nagel	Germany	30 April 1930	91	26 February 2022	Braga, Portugal	European Masters Championships indoor	

=== 3000 metres women ===
Age group	Record	Athlete	Nationality	Birthdate	Age	Date	Place	Meet	Ref.
W 35	8:27.83	Maricica Puica	Romania	29 July 1950	35	7 September 1985	Rome, Italy	Golden Gala	
W 40
W 40	9:03.40	Nuria Fernández	Spain	16 August 1976	40	24 June 2017	Villeneuve-d'Ascq, France	European Teams Championships	
W 40	8:58.20 i	Nuria Fernández	Spain	16 August 1976	40	3 March 2017	Belgrade, Serbia	European Indoor Championships	
W 40	9:01.1+ h	Joanne Pavey	Great Britain	20 September 1973	40	4 June 2014	Rome, Italy	Golden Gala	
W 45	9:17.27	Yekaterina Podkopayeva	Soviet Union	11 June 1952	45	22 June 1997	Munich, Germany	European Cup	
W 45	9:11.67 i	Nicole Leveque	France	27 January 1951	45	11 February 1996	Paris, France	France International Championships	
W 50	9:47.20	Gitte Karlshøj	Denmark	14 May 1959	50	19 May 2009	Aarhus, Denmark	ABC Staevne 1	
W 55	10:03.91	Silke Schmidt	Germany	7 August 1959	55	10 July 2015	Utrecht Netherlands	Utrecht Track Meeting	
W 60	10:28.76	Clare Elms	Great Britain	26 December 1963	62	5 July 2026	Catford, United Kingdom	Ron Hale Open	
W 65	11:19.24	Fiona Matheson	Great Britain	25 April 1961	65	11 September July 2026	Derby, United Kingdom	United Kingdom Masters Championships	
W 70	12:13.12	Angela Copson	Great Britain	20 April 1947	71	1 September 2018	Solihull, United Kingdom	Midland Masters League Final	
W 75	12:38.84	Sarah Roberts	Great Britain	6 October 1949	75	13 July 2025	Cambridge, United Kingdom	Southern Athletics League Division 2 North & East Round 3	
W 75	12:28.82 i	Sarah Roberts	Great Britain	6 October 1949	75	26 March 2025	Gainesville, United States	World Masters Indoor Championships	
W 80	15:32.63	Melitta Czerwenka-Nagel	Germany	30 April 1930	81	14 July 2011	Saarbrücken, Germany		
W 85	18:59.04+	Nina Naumemko	Russia	25 June 1925	86	17 September 2011	Lignano Sabbiadoro, Italy	European Masters Games	

=== 5000 metres women ===
Age group	Record	Athlete	Nationality	Birthdate	Age	Date	Place	Meet	Ref.
W 35	14:49.68	Maria Konovalova	Russia	14 August 1974	35	14 July 2010	Saransk, Russia	Russian National Championships	
W 40	15:04.87	Joanne Pavey	Great Britain	20 September 1973	40	5 June 2014	Rome, Italy	Golden Gala	
W 45	15:55.71	Nicole Leveque	France	27 January 1951	45	1 June 1996	Angers, France		
W 50	16:51.17	Gitte Karlshøj	Denmark	14 May 1959	50	23 June 2009	Aarhus, Denmark		
W 55	17:29.28	Silke Schmidt	Germany	7 August 1959	55	27 June 2015	Eindhoven, Netherlands	Eef Kamerbeek Games	
W 60	17:59.16	Silke Schmidt	Germany	7 August 1959	60	20 September 2019	Wageningen, Netherlands	Wageningen Track Meeting	
W 65	19:25.13	Fiona Matheson	Great Britain	25 April 1961	65	4 July 2026	Stirling, United Kingdom	The Pursuit 5000m	
W 70	20:56.13	Angela Copson	Great Britain	20 April 1947	70	25 June 2017	Birmingham, United Kingdom	BMAF Championships	
W 75	21:25.8 h	Sarah Roberts	Great Britain	6 October 1949	75	25 September 2025	Hemel Hempstead, United Kingdom	Dacorum AC Club Champs 5000m	
W 80	26:33.60	Denise Leclerc	France	10 October 1933	80	29 August 2014	İzmir, Turkey	European Masters Championships	
W 85	32:29.94	Melitta Czerwenka-Nagel	Germany	30 April 1930	85	8 July 2016	Leinefelde, Germany	Germany Masters Championships	

=== 10,000 metres women ===
Age group	Record	Athlete	Nationality	Birthdate	Age	Date	Place	Meet	Ref.
W35	30:53.20	Joanne Pavey	Great Britain	20 September 1973	38	3 August 2012	London, United Kingdom	Olympic Games	
W40	31:33.44	Joanne Pavey	Great Britain	20 September 1973	42	12 August 2016	Rio de Janeiro, Brazil	Olympic Games	
W 45	32:34.05	Evy Palm	Sweden	31 January 1942	46	4 September 1988	Helsinki, Finland	Finland vs Sweden Teams	
W 50	35:05.7 h	Fiona Matheson	Great Britain	25 April 1961	50	16 October 2011	Coatbridge, United Kingdom	Scottish Veterans Harriers Championships	
W 55	36:53.81	Silke Schmidt	Germany	7 August 1959	55	2 May 2015	Ohrdruf, Germany	Germany Championships 10000m	
W 60	39:07.46	Fiona Matheson	Great Britain	25 April 1961	60	8 August 2021	Greenock, United Kingdom	Scottish Masters 10000m Track Championships	
W 65	41:40.27	Angela Copson	Great Britain	20 April 1947	65	5 August 2012	Oxford, United Kingdom	BMAF Championships 10000m	
W 65	40:21.88	Maryse Le Gallo	France	27 April 1960	65	24 May 2025	Pacé, France	Championnats de France du 10 000 m	
W 70	44:25.14	Angela Copson	Great Britain	20 April 1947	70	28 July 2017	Aarhus, Denmark	European Masters Athletics Championships	
W 75	45:59.81	Sarah Roberts	Great Britain	6 October 1949	75	24 May 2025	Horspath, United Kingdom	BMAF 10000m Champs	
W 80	55:26.46	Denise Leclerc	France	10 October 1933	80	21 October 2013	Porto Alegre, Brazil	World Masters Athletics Championships	
W 85	1:26:15.07	Vladyklena Kokina	Ukraine	13 October 1926	87	21 September 2014	Kyiv, Ukraine		

=== Half marathon women ===
Age group	Record	Athlete	Nationality	Birthdate	Age	Date	Place	Meet	Ref.
W 35	1:08:07+	Constantina Dita	Romania	23 Jan 1970	36	22 October 2006	Chicago, United States	Chicago Marathon	
W 40	1:09:18	Karolina Nadolska	Poland	6 September 1981	40	17 October 2021	Poznań, Poland	Poznań Half Marathon	
W 45	1:11:18	Evy Palm	Sweden	31 January 1942	46	16 July 1988	Östnor, Sweden	Swedish Half Marathon Championships	
W 50	1:15:05+	Catherine Bertone	Italy	6 May 1972	50	4 December 2022	Valencia, Spain	Valencia Marathon	
W 55	1:19:39	Silke Schmidt	Germany	7 August 1959	55	8 March 2015	Den Haag, Netherlands	City-Pier-City Loop	
W 60	1:21:33	Silke Schmidt	Germany	7 August 1959	60	3 November 2019	Dordrecht, Netherlands	DrechtStadLoop Half Marathon	
W 65	1:26:13 (1:25:52c)	Rosa Mota	Portugal	29 June 1958	65	22 October 2023	Valencia, Spain	Valencia Half Marathon	
W 70	1:36:14 (1:36:13c)	Jeannine Liebrand	Netherlands	22 November 1953	70	3 November 2024	Dordrecht, Netherlands	Mulder Van Mill Half Marathon	
W 75	1:47:37 (1:47:20c)	Heide Bock	Germany	7 July 1940	76	12 March 2017	Kandel, Germany	Bienwald Marathon	
W 80	2:07:17	Odette Maisongrosse	France	4 February 1936	80	5 June 2016	Oloron, France	Semi Marathon Oloron	
W 80	2:02:07	Franca Maria Monasterolo	Italy	26 September 1943	80	5 November 2023	Turin, Italy	Turin Marathon	
W 85	3:07:48	Zdenka Kirsch	Germany	16 November 1929	85	17 May 2015	Grosseto, Italy	European Masters Championships Non Stadia	

=== Marathon Women ===
Age group	Record	Athlete	Nationality	Birthdate	Age	Date	Place	Meet	Ref.
W 35	2:19:19	Irina Mikitenko	Germany	23 August 1972	36	28 September 2008	Berlin, Germany	Berlin Marathon	
W 40	2:22:27	Mariya Konovalova	Russia	14 August 1974	40	8 March 2015	Nagoya, Japan	Nagoya Marathon	
W 45	2:28:34	Catherine Bertone	Italy	6 May 1972	45	24 September 2017	Berlin, Germany	Berlin Marathon	
W 50	2:31:05	Tatyana Pozdnyakova	Ukraine	4 March 1955	50	6 March 2005	Los Angeles, United States	Los Angeles Marathon	
W 55	2:45:52 (2:45:45c)	Karima Harris	Great Britain	23 September 1969	55	11 May 2025	Copenhagen, Denmark	Copenhagen Marathon	
W 60	2:57:24 (2:57:23c)	Treena Johnson	Great Britain	29 August 1961	62	8 October 2023	Chester, United Kingdom	Chester Marathon	
W 65	3:12:56	Emmi Lüthi	Switzerland	1 March 1944	65	26 April 2009	Zürich, Switzerland	Zürich Marathon	
W 70	3:27:00 (3:26:40c)	Laurence Dupont Alnet	France	18 July 1954	70	24 November 2024	La Rochelle, France	La Rochelle Marathon	
W 75	3:41:55 (3:39:51c)	Vera Nystad	Norway	18 December 1945	75	3 July 2021	Jølster, Norway	Norwegian Masters Marathon Championships	
W 80	4:59:15 (4:52:55c)	Franca Maria Monasterolo	Italy	26 September 1943	80	26 November 2023	Florence, Italy	Florence Marathon	
W 85	6:28.04 (6:03.32c)	Helga Kuendig	Switzerland	28 June 1928	85	29 September 2013	Berlin, Germany	Berlin Marathon	
W 90+	11:34.00	Jenny Wood-Allen	Great Britain	14 April 2002	90	21 November 1911	London, United Kingdom	London Marathon	

=== 2000 metres steeplechase women ===
Age group	Record	Athlete	Nationality	Birthdate	Age	Date	Place	Meet	Ref.
W 35	6:26.36	Ophélie Claude-Boxberger	France	18 October 1988	60	18 May 2025	Pliezhausen, Germany	Internationales Läufermeeting	
W 40	7:00.02	Danuta Woszczek	Poland	20 February 1978	41	12 September 2019	Jesolo, Italy	European Masters Championships	
W 40	6:50.00	Clarisse Pinho Cruz	Portugal	9 July 1978	41	1 July 2020	Braga, Portugal		
W 40	6:57.67	Clarisse Pinho Cruz	Portugal	9 July 1978	42	25 July 2020	Vagos, Portugal	National Clubs Championships	
W 40	6:46.15	Clarisse Pinho Cruz	Portugal	9 July 1978	42	8 August 2020	Lisbon, Portugal	Portuguese Championships	
W 45	6:50.81	Kirsti Booth	Great Britain	10 February 1978	45	15 July 2023	Yeovil, United Kingdom	National Athletics League Championship	
W 50	7:30.45	Nuria Etxegarai Carbajo	Spain	28 May 1973	52	20 June 2025	La Nucia, Spain	Spanish Masters Championships	
W 55	7:51.91	Lisa Margaret Thomas	Great Britain	28 March 1965	56	15 August 2021	Perivale, United Kingdom	Southern Athletics League	
W 60	8:26.94	Elke Hausler	Germany	15 February 1963	60	3 September 2023	Derby, United Kingdom	BMAF Championships	
W 65	9:03.71	Jane Wickham Essery	Spain	21 March 1961	65	22 August 2026	Daegu, South Korea	World Masters Championships	
W 70	10:37.93	Eliisa Reijonen	Finland	22 November 1952	70	5 July 2023	Tampere, Finland	European Masters Games	
W 70	10:24.66	Rimma Vasina	Russia	23 October 1940	70	14 September 2011	Lignano Sabbiadoro, Italy	European Masters Games	
W 75	11:02.58	Hillen Von Malthzahn	Germany	17 January 1949	76	11 October 2025	Madeira, Portugal	European Masters Championships	
W 80	13:38.80	Anne Martin	Great Britain	9 January 1936	80	6 November 2016	Perth, Australia	World Masters Championships	
W 85	16:55.73	Anne Martin	Great Britain	9 January 1936	86	8 July 2022	Tampere, Finland	World Masters Championships	

=== 100 metres hurdles women ===
Age group	Record	Athlete	Nationality	Birthdate	Age	Date	Place	Meet	Ref.	Video
W 35	12.47 (+0.7 m/s)	Ludmila Enqvist	Sweden	21 April 1964	35	28 August 1999	Seville Spain	World Athletics Championships		

=== 80 metres hurdles women ===
Age group	Record	Athlete	Nationality	Birthdate	Age	Date	Place	Meet	Ref.
W 40	11.24 (+0.1 m/s)	Monica Pellegrinelli	Switzerland	14 May 1965	40	31 August 2005	San Sebastián, Spain	World Masters Championships	
W 45	11.51 (+0.3 m/s)	Christine Müller	Switzerland	22 July 1958	46	22 July 2004	Randers, Denmark	European Masters Championships	
W 45	11.51 (+1.3 m/s)	Serena Caravelli	Italy	18 December 1979	45	10 October 2025	Madeira, Portugal	European Masters Championships	
W 50	12.08 (+2.0 m/s)	Christine Müller	Switzerland	22 July 1958	50	10 July 2009	Vaterstetten, Germany	Germany Masters Championships	
W 55	12.31 (+0.8 m/s)	Helgi Lamp	Estonia	17 June 1944	55	17 July 1999	Haapsalu, Estonia		
W 60	12.90 (−0.1 m/s)	Jane Horder	Great Britain	18 January 1957	60	2 August 2017	Aarhus, Denmark	European Masters Championships	
W 65	13.22 (+1.8 m/s)	Jane Horder	Great Britain	18 January 1957	65	11 June 2022	Derby, United Kingdom	British Masters Championships	
W 65	13.11 (±0.0 m/s)	Jane Horder	Great Britain	18 January 1957	66	11 June 2023	Nuneaton, United Kingdom	Midland Masters Championships	
W 70	15.58 (−0.3 m/s)	Carole Filer	Great Britain	28 November 1955	70	11 September 2026	Derby, United Kingdom	British Masters Championships	
W 70	15.50 (−0.3 m/s)	Eliane Piret Declerck	France	2 December 1950	71	9 July 2022	Tampere, Finland	World Masters Championships	
W 75	17.24 (+0.5 m/s)	Riet Jonkers	Netherlands	4 October 1943	75	27 July 2019	Dilbeek, Belgium	Belgium Masters Pentathlon Championships	
W 80	21.74 (−1.0 m/s)	Kirsten Osberg	Denmark	22 June 1944	80	14 August 2024	Gothenburg, Sweden	World Masters Athletics Championships	

=== 200 metres hurdles women ===
Age group	Record	Athlete	Nationality	Birthdate	Age	Date	Place	Meet	Ref.
W 70	38.97 (±0.0 m/s)	Ulla Karnebäck	Sweden	9 May 1953	70	14 May 2023	Tumba, Sweden	VDM Gotland-Stockholm	
W 70	37.28 (−0.7 m/s) (Note: not ratified due to wrong hurdles height)	Marja Metsänkylä	Finland	6 January 1951	71	5 July 2022	Tampere, Finland	World Masters Championships	
W 75	40.41 (+0.6 m/s)	Emily McMahon	Great Britain	25 April 1950	75	27 July 2025	London, United Kingdom	London International Masters	
W 80	57.79 (Note: not ratified due to wrong hurdles height)	Terttu Kilpeläinen	Finland	10 February 1942	80	5 July 2022	Tampere, Finland	World Masters Championships	

=== 400 metres hurdles women ===
Age group	Record	Athlete	Nationality	Birthdate	Age	Date	Place	Meet	Ref.
W 35	52.94	Marina Stepanova	Soviet Union	1 May 1950	36	17 September 1986	Tashkent, Soviet Union		
W 40	58.35	Barbara Gähling	Germany	20 January 1965	42	21 July 2007	Erfurt, Germany	German Championships	
W 40	57.59	Elisabeth Slettum	Norway	31 August 1986	40	2 September 2026	Smederevo, Serbia	Continental Tour	
W 45	61.28	Barbara Gähling	Germany	20 January 1965	46	1 May 2014	Moers, Germany	Regional Championships	
W 45	61.40	Barbara Gähling	Germany	20 January 1965	46	2 June 2011	Cologne, Germany		

=== 300 metres hurdles women ===
Age group	Record	Athlete	Nationality	Birthdate	Age	Date	Place	Meet	Ref.
W 50	44.90	Barbara Gähling	Germany	20 January 1965	50	12 August 2015	Lyon, France	World Masters Championships	
W 55	46.74	Barbara Gähling	Germany	20 January 1965	57	8 May 2022	Cologne, Germany	Hurdles/Sprints meeting	
W 60	46.64	Barbara Gähling	Germany	20 January 1965	61	17 July 2026	Mönchengladbach, Germany	German Masters Championships	
W 65	52.41	Jane Horder	Great Britain	18 January 1957	66	22 September 2023	Pescara, Italy	European Masters Championships	
W 65	52.33 (Note: not ratified due to wrong hurdles height)	Jane Horder	Great Britain	18 January 1957	65	5 July 2022	Tampere, Finland	World Masters Championships	
event defunct, age group now doing 200 m officially
W 70	1:11.08	Leili Kaas	Estonia	1 October 1934	73	27 July 2008	Ljubljana, Slovenia	European Masters Championships	

=== High jump women ===
Age group	Record	Athlete	Nationality	Birthdate	Age	Date	Place	Meet	Ref.
W 35	2.01	Inga Babakova	Ukraine	27 June 1967	35	27 June 2003	Oslo, Norway	Bislett Games	
W 35	2.01	Ruth Beitia	Spain	1 April 1979	35	17 August 2014	Zürich, Switzerland	Weltklasse Zürich	
W 35	2.02 i	Anna Chicherova	Russia	22 July 1982	36	15 February 2019	Moscow, Russia	Russian Championships	
W 40
W 40	1.90	Venelina Veneva-Mateeva	Bulgaria	13 June 1974	40	12 July 2014	Plovdiv, Bulgaria	Memorial Vulpev	
W 40	1.90	Venelina Veneva-Mateeva	Bulgaria	13 June 1974	40	26 July 2014	Pitești, Romania	Balkan Championships	
W 40	1.94 i	Venelina Veneva-Mateeva	Bulgaria	13 June 1974	40	15 February 2015	Dobrich, Bulgaria	National indoor Championships	
W 40	1.94 i	Venelina Veneva-Mateeva	Bulgaria	13 June 1974	40	6 March 2015	Prague, Czech Republic	European Championships indoor	
W 45	1.70	Julia Machin	Great Britain	26 March 1970	49	1 September 2019	Ashford, United Kingdom	Southern Counties Masters Championships	
W 50	1.68	Julia Machin	Great Britain	26 March 1970	51	31 May 2021	Bedford, United Kingdom	BIGish High Jump and Throws Fest	
W 50	1.70	Julia Machin	Great Britain	26 March 1970	51	20 June 2021	Brighton, United Kingdom	Southern Athletics League – Sussex Coast	
W 55	1.64	Julia Machin	Great Britain	26 March 1970	55	14 September 2025	Derby, United Kingdom	BMAF Championships	
W 60	1.54	Barbara Gähling	Germany	20 January 1965	60	29 May 2025	Köln, Germany	Christi-Himmelfahrt-Sportfest	
W 65	1.42	Weia Reinboud	Netherlands	11 March 1950	65	21 June 2015	Den Helder Netherlands	SV Noordkop	
W 65	1.43 i	Frauke Viebahn	Germany	26 November 1959	65	3 March 2025	Frankfurt, Germany	German Masters Championships	
W 70	1.34	Weia Reinboud	Netherlands	11 March 1950	71	18 September 2021	Hengelo Netherlands	Dutch Masters Championships	
W 75	1.28	Weia Reinboud	Netherlands	11 March 1950	75	25 May 2025	Oosterhout, Netherlands	SPAR Competitie Masters P22	
W 80	1.18	Rietje Dijkman	Netherlands	21 June 1939	82	31 October 2021	Hilversum, Netherlands		
W 85	0.95	Rosa Pedersen	Denmark	25 February 1930	85	8 August 2015	Lyon, France	World Masters Championships	
W 90	0.88	Rosa Pedersen	Denmark	25 February 1930	92	7 June 2022	Odense, Denmark	Master Holdkamp	

=== Pole vault women ===
Age group	Record	Athlete	Nationality	Birthdate	Age	Date	Place	Meet	Ref.
W 35	4.80	Tina Šutej	Slovenia	7 November 1988	36	17 September 2025	Tokyo, Japan	World Championships	
W 40	4.15	Carolin Hingst	Germany	18 September 1980	42	21 May 2023	Diefflen, Germany	Stabhochsprung auf dem Dorfplatz	
W 40	4.15	Carolin Hingst	Germany	18 September 1980	42	3 June 2023	Zweibrücken, Germany	Sky's the Limit	
W 45	3.77	Elisabete Ribeiro Tavares	France	7 March 1980	46	23 May 2026	Tremblay, France	Championnats Zone 93 Individuels	
W 50	3.46	Irie Hill	Great Britain	16 January 1969	50	29 September 2019	Holzgerlingen, Germany	Holzgerlinger pole vault meeting	
W 50	3.51 i	Irie Hill	Great Britain	16 January 1969	50	30 March 2019	Toruń, Poland	World Masters Indoor Championships	
W 55	3.22	Irie Hill	Great Britain	16 January 1969	55	7 September 2024	Gräfelfing, Germany	G-Town jumps 2024	
W 55	3.30 i	Irie Hill	Great Britain	16 January 1969	55	20 March 2024	Toruń, Poland	European Masters Indoor Championships	
W 60	2.88	Brigitte van de Kamp	Netherlands	15 June 1960	63	30 June 2023	Harderwijk, Netherlands	Dutch Masters Championships	
W 60	2.91 i	Susan Yeomans	Great Britain	16 March 1953	61	7 March 2015	Lee Valley, United Kingdom	BMAF Championships indoor	
W 65	2.85	Brigitte van de Kamp	Netherlands	15 June 1960	65	18 October 2025	Madeira, Portugal	European Masters Championships	
W 70	2.40	Ute Ritte	Germany	21 March 1952	70	4 June 2022	Horn-Bad Meinberg, Germany	Horner Stabhochsprung	
W 70	2.41	Ute Ritte	Germany	21 March 1952	70	11 June 2022	Dortmund, Germany	Sparkassen Jump’n’Run Meeting	
W 70	2.42	Ute Ritte	Germany	21 March 1952	70	3 July 2022	Euskirchen, Germany	Nordrhein Masters Championships	
W 75	1.90	Kirsti Viitanen	Finland	21 August 1942	75	3 September 2017	Turku, Finland		
W 80	1.65	Kirsti Viitanen	Finland	21 August 1942	80	5 September 2022	Turku, Finland		

=== Long jump women ===
Age group	Record	Athlete	Nationality	Birthdate	Age	Date	Place	Meet	Ref.
W 35	6.99 (+1.9 m/s)	Heike Drechsler	Germany	16 December 1964	35	29 September 2000	Sydney, Australia	Olympic Games	
W 40	6.55 (+1.2 m/s)	Tatyana Ter-Mesrobyan	Russia	12 May 1968	40	18 July 2008	Kazan, Russia	Russian National Championships (q)	
W 40	6.63 (+1.7 m/s)	Tatyana Ter-Mesrobyan	Russia	12 May 1968	44	26 June 2012	Saint Petersburg, Russia		
W 40	6.64 i	Tatyana Ter-Mesrobyan	Russia	12 May 1968	41	5 January 2010	Saint Petersburg, Russia	St Petersburg Cup	
W 45	5.82 (+0.2 m/s)	Tatyana Ter-Mesrobyan	Russia	12 May 1968	45	22 July 2013	Moscow, Russia	Russian National Championships (q)	
W 50	5.89 (+0.4 m/s)	Sandrine Hennart	Belgium	12 December 1972	53	12 July 2026	Braine-l'Alleud, Belgium	Allianz Championnats LBFA	
W 55	5.46 (−1.5 m/s)	Renata Novosel	Croatia	28 November 1967	55	8 July 2023	Varaždin, Croatia	Croatian Masters Championships	
W 60	5.07 (+1.3 m/s)	Petra Bajeat	France	6 March 1966	60	13 June 2026	Epinal, France	France Masters Championships	
W 65	4.64 (+0.8 m/s)	Christiane Schmalbruch	Germany	8 January 1937	65	16 August 2002	Potsdam, Germany	European Masters Championships	
W 70	4.16 (+0.9 m/s)	Christiane Schmalbruch	Germany	8 January 1937	70	14 September 2007	Riccione, Italy	World Masters Championships	
W 75	3.77 (+0.1 m/s)	Paula Schneiderhahn	Germany	16 November 1921	75	4 October 1997	Nieder-Olm, Germany		
W 80	3.45 (+1.6 m/s)	Christiane Schmalbruch	Germany	8 January 1937	80	10 June 2017	Rostock, Germany	Landesmeisterschaften Open	
W 80	3.45 (−1.9 m/s)	Rietje Dijkman	Netherlands	21 June 1939	80	9 September 2019	Caorle, Italy	European Masters Championships	
W 80	3.49 i	Rietje Dijkman	Netherlands	21 June 1939	82	22 February 2022	Braga, Portugal	European Masters Championships indoor	
W 85	3.00 (+0.0 m/s)	Rietje Dijkman	Netherlands	21 June 1939	87	1 August 2026	Halberstadt, Germany	Masters Interland 2026	
W 90	2.54 (+1.7 m/s)	Rosa Pedersen	Denmark	25 February 1930	91	8 June 2021	Odense, Denmark	Master holdturnering	
W 90	2.60 (+1.3 m/s)	Rosa Pedersen	Denmark	25 February 1930	90	23 June 2020	Odense, Denmark		
W 95	1.14 (+1.4 m/s)	Seppi Sopanen	Finland	11 September 1927	95	17 June 2023	Kuopio, Finland	Finland Masters Championships	

=== Triple jump women ===
Age group	Record	Athlete	Nationality	Birthdate	Age	Date	Place	Meet	Ref.
W 35	14.65 (−0.3 m/s)	Yamilé Aldama	Great Britain	14 August 1972	39	31 May 2012	Rome, Italy	Golden Gala	
W 35	14.68 (NWI)	Tatyana Lebedeva	Russia	21 July 1976	35	14 July 2012	Cheboksary, Russia		
W 35	14.82 i	Yamilé Aldama	Great Britain	14 August 1972	39	10 March 2012	Istanbul Turkey	World Indoor Championships	
W 40	14.06 (+1.5 m/s)	Yamilé Aldama	Great Britain	14 August 1972	40	1 June 2013	Eugene United States	Prefontaine Classic	
W 45	12.30 (+0.1 m/s)	Barbara Lah	Italy	24 March 1972	47	11 May 2019	San Biagio di Callalta, Italy	Italian Regional Clubs Championships	
W 45	12.75 (+1.1 m/s)	Tatyana Ter-Mesrobyan	Russia	12 May 1968	45	10 July 2013	Saint Petersburg, Russia	Saint Petersburg Championships	
W 45	12.42 (+1.0 m/s)	Murielle Glovil	France	7 July 1968	45	18 May 2014	Aix-les-Bains, France	Clubs Championships	
W 50	11.37 (+1.6 m/s)	Anna Wlodarczyk	Poland	24 March 1951	50	10 July 2001	Brisbane Australia	World Masters Championships	
W 50	11.37 (−1.2 m/s)	Maria Costanza Moroni	Italy	23 March 1969	52	23 May 2021	Donnas, Italy	Regional Championships	
W 50	11.69 i	Andrea Szirbucz	Hungary	7 May 1972	50	30 March 2023	Toruń, Poland	World Masters Indoor Championships	
W 55	10.82 (+0.8 m/s)	Petra Herrmann	Germany	2 September 1959	55	15 August 2015	Lyon France	World Masters Championships	
W 55	10.96 i	Annica Sandstroem	Sweden	25 February 1968	55	30 March 2023	Toruń Poland	World Masters Indoor Championships	
W 60	10.31 (+0.7 m/s)	Petra Herrmann	Germany	2 September 1959	60	7 September 2019	Caorle Italy	European Masters Championships	
W 65	10.12 (+1.9 m/s)	Petra Herrmann	Germany	2 September 1959	65	28 September 2024	Neukieritzsch Germany	Landesoffener Bahnabschluss	
W 70	8.65 (−0.6 m/s)	Christiane Schmalbruch	Germany	8 January 1937	72	2 August 2009	Lahti Finland	World Masters Championships	
W 75	7.94 (−0.4 m/s)	Rietje Dijkman	Netherlands	21 June 1939	77	29 July 2017	Aarhus Denmark	European Masters Championships	
W 75	8.02 (+0.1 m/s)	Rietje Dijkman	Netherlands	21 June 1939	77	10 June 2017	Gouda, Netherlands	Netherlands Masters Championships	
W 80	7.37 (+1.3 m/s)	Rietje Dijkman	Netherlands	21 June 1939	80	5 September 2019	Caorle Italy	European Masters Championships	
W 80	7.57 i	Rietje Dijkman	Netherlands	21 June 1939	82	23 February 2022	Braga Portugal	European Masters Championships indoor	
W 85	5.05 (+0.0 m/s)	Iris Holder	Great Britain	24 February 1941	85	13 September 2026	Derby, Great Britain	British Masters Athletics Championships	
W 85	5.23 i	Iris Holder	Great Britain	24 February 1941	85	29 March 2026	Torun, Poland	European Masters Championships indoor	
W 90	3.40 (−1.5 m/s)	Seppi Sopanen	Finland	11 September 1927	90	12 June 2018	Málaga, Spain	World Masters Championships	
W 95	2.56 (+1.4 m/s)	Seppi Sopanen	Finland	11 September 1927	95	18 June 2023	Kuopio, Finland	Finland Masters Championships	

=== Shot put women ===
Age group	Record	Athlete	Nationality	Birthdate	Age	Date	Place	Meet	Ref.
W 35	21.46	Larisa Peleshenko	Russia	29 February 1964	36	26 August 2000	Moscow Russia	Memorial Kuts	
W 35	21.47 i	Helena Fibingerová	Czech Republic	13 July 1949	35	9 February 1985	Jablonec nad Nisou Czechoslovakia	National Championships indoor	
W 40	19.05	Antonina Ivanova	Soviet Union	25 December 1932	40	23 August 1973	Orel Soviet Union		
W 40	19.16 i	Antonina Ivanova	Soviet Union	25 December 1932	41	24 February 1974	Moscow Soviet Union		
W 45	16.95	Zdeňka Šilhavá	Czech Republic	15 June 1954	45	26 June 1999	Ostrava Czech Republic	National Championships	
W 50	15.15	Alexandra Marghieva	Moldova	27 June 1959	50	4 August 2009	Lahti Finland	World Masters Championships	
W 50	15.17 i	Alexandra Marghieva	Moldova	27 June 1959	51	18 March 2011	Ghent Belgium	European Masters Championships Indoor	
W 55	14.47	Sigrin Kofink	Germany	23 April 1935	56	21 July 1991	Turku Finland	WAVA Championships	
W 55	14.53 i	Mihaela Loghin	Romania	1 June 1952	58	18 March 2011	Ghent Belgium	European Masters Championships Indoor	
W 60	13.68	Mihaela Loghin	Romania	1 June 1952	60	9 June 2012	Bucharest Romania	National Masters Championships	
W 60	13.70 i	Mihaela Loghin	Romania	1 June 1952	62	23 March 2015	Toruń, Poland	European Masters Championships Indoor	
W 65	13.36	Mihaela Loghin	Romania	1 June 1952	65	1 July 2017	Bucharest, Romania	National Masters Championships	
W 70	11.02	Rosemary Chrimes	Great Britain	19 May 1933	70	7 June 2003	Derby, United Kingdom	BMAF National Championships	
W 70	11.09	Mihaela Loghin	Romania	1 June 1952	70	30 June 2022	Tampere, Finland	World Masters Championships	
W 75	12.12	Marianne Maier	Austria	25 December 1942	75	4 September 2018	Málaga, Spain	World Masters Championships	
W 75	12.29	Marianne Maier	Austria	25 December 1942	77	5 September 2020	Götzis, Austria	Internationale VLV Masters Stadionmeisterschaften	
W 80	10.67	Marianne Maier	Austria	25 December 1942	81	8 June 2024	Höchst, Austria	Internationale Meeting Open	
W 80	10.84 i	Marianne Maier	Austria	25 December 1942	82	22 February 2025	Dornbirn, Austria	International VLV Hallen-Masters Meisterschaften	
W 85	9.42	Evaun B. Williams	Great Britain	19 December 1937	86	17 August 2024	Gothenburg, Sweden	World Masters Championships	
W 90	6.25	Rosa Pedersen	Denmark	25 February 1930	90	23 August 2020	Greve, Denmark	DM Masters	
W 90	6.82	Nora Kutti	Estonia	9 October 1922	90	15 June 2013	Vändra, Estonia		
W 95	5.32	Gabre Gabric	Italy	14 October 1914	95	17 July 2010	Nyíregyháza, Hungary	European Masters Championships	
W 100	3.18	Elfriede Fuchs	Austria	26 August 1920	100	20 September 2020	Sankt Pölten, Austria	National Masters Championships	

=== Discus throw women ===
Age group	Record	Athlete	Nationality	Birthdate	Age	Date	Place	Meet	Ref.
W 35	69.60	Faina Melnik	Soviet Union	9 July 1945	35	9 September 1980	Donetsk, Ukraine	USSR National Championships	
W 40	67.89	Iryná Yatchenko	Belarus	31 October 1965	42	29 June 2008	Minsk, Belarus		
W 45	65.96	Mélina Robert-Michon	France	18 July 1979	46	9 April 2026	Ramona, United States	Oklahoma Throws Series	
W 50	46.11	Olga Chernyavskaya	Russia	17 September 1963	51	11 August 2015	Lyon France	World Masters Championships	
W 50	48.98	Olga Chernyavskaya	Russia	17 September 1963	51	11 February 2015	Adler Russia	Memorial Lunyov	
W 55	43.36	Tamara Danilova	Russia	30 July 1939	57	10 August 1996	Prien am Chiemsee Germany		
W 60	39.24	Karen Illgen	Germany	7 April 1941	61	15 June 2002	Halle Germany		
W 65	37.62	Tamara Danilova	Russia	30 July 1939	66	28 August 2005	San Sebastián Spain	World Masters Championships	
W 70
W 70	33.80	Tamara Danilova	Russia	30 July 1939	70	6 August 2009	Lahti Finland	World Masters Championships	
W 70	33.55	Tamara Danilova	Russia	30 July 1939	70	21 July 2010	Nyíregyháza Hungary	European Masters Championships	
W 75	31.56	Tamara Danilova	Russia	30 July 1939	76	16 October 2015	Nice France	European Masters Games	
W 75	32.09	Tamara Danilova	Russia	30 July 1939	76	28 August 2015	Chelyabinsk Russia	Russian Masters Championships	
W 80	26.53	Anne Cathrine Rühlow	Germany	30 September 1936	80	25 May 2017	Paderborn Germany	Westfälische Masters Championships	
W 85	22.42	Evaun B. Williams	Great Britain	19 December 1937	86	18 August 2024	Gothenburg, Sweden	World Masters Championships	
W 90	14.16	Nora Kutti	Estonia	9 October 1922	91	9 October 2012	Tartu Estonia		
W 90	15.01	Nora Kutti	Estonia	9 October 1922	91	15 October 2013	Tartu Estonia		
W 95	12.86	Gabre Gabric	Italy	14 October 1914	95	21 July 2010	Nyíregyháza Hungary	European Masters Championships	

=== Hammer throw women ===
Age group	Record	Athlete	Nationality	Birthdate	Age	Date	Place	Meet	Ref.
W 35	78.48	Anita Wlodarczyk	Poland	8 August 1985	35	3 August 2021	Tokyo Japan	Olympic Games	
W 40	75.01	Anita Wlodarczyk	Poland	8 August 1985	40	16 July 2026	Madrid, Spain	Madrid Meeting	
W 45	65.99	Yipsi Moreno	Albania	19 November 1980	45	2 September 2026	Taranto, Italy	Mediterranean Games	
W 45	66.41	Yipsi Moreno	Albania	19 November 1980	45	3 May 2026	Vila Nova de Cerveira, Portugal	International throws meet third day	
W 45	67.85	Yipsi Moreno	Albania	19 November 1980	45	20 June 2026	Volos, Greece	Balkan Championships	
W 50	53.32	Claudine Chirol Cacaut	France	23 November 1964	50	7 August 2015	Lyon, France	World Masters Championships	
W 55	50.61	Gonny Mik	Netherlands	23 March 1965	55	19 September 2020	Soest, Germany	Soest Werfertag	
W 55	50.87	Cornelia Hodel	Switzerland	13 April 1953	55	8 June 2018	Olten, Germany		
W 55	51.05	Jenny Meyer Klein	France	10 February 1969	56	4 May 2025	Bruay la Buissière, France	Regional Masters Meet	
W 55	51.65	Jenny Meyer Klein	France	10 February 1969	56	18 June 2025	Lyon, France	Throws Meet	
W 60	47.38	Gonny Mik	Netherlands	23 May 1965	61	5 June 2026	Vught, Netherlands	Netherlands National Masters Championships	
W 65	44.38	Jutta Schäfer	Germany	17 October 1931	65	17 August 1997	Schweinfurt, Germany	Germany Masters Championships	
W 70	39.24	Eva Nohl	Germany	27 November 1948	70	3 October 2019	Effeltrich, Germany	Pantel Rasenkraftsport Dreikampf	
W 75	40.83	Eva Nohl	Germany	27 November 1948	75	20 July 2024	Essingen, Germany	throws pentathlon	
W 80	37.85	Evaun B. Williams	Great Britain	19 December 1937	80	12 September 2018	Málaga, Spain	World Masters Championships	
W 80	31.10 3kg	Evaun B. Williams	Great Britain	19 December 1937	80	2 July 2018	Lee Valley, United Kingdom	SCVAC – Vets League	
W 85	31.11 (Note: record set during Throws Pentathlon competition)	Evaun B. Williams	Great Britain	19 December 1937	85	26 September 2023	Pescara, Italy	European Masters Championships	
W 90	18.81	Hilja Bakhoff	Estonia	23 December 1926	90	7 October 2017	Viljandi, Estonia		
W 95	11.63	Nora Kutti	Estonia	9 October 1922	95	10 October 2017	Tartu, Estonia		

=== Javelin throw women ===
Effective the 2014 season, WMA increased the weight of the javelin for women 60–75. Until the records of the lighter implements are surpassed, two records are officially kept.

Age group	Record	Athlete	Nationality	Birthdate	Age	Date	Place	Meet	Ref.
W 35	68.34	Steffi Nerius	Germany	1 July 1972	36	31 August 2008	Elstal, Germany	Elstal DKB-Cup	
W 40	63.08	Barbora Špotáková	Czech Republic	30 June 1981	40	9 July 2021	Monaco	Herculis	
W 45	54.29	Barbora Špotáková	Czech Republic	30 June 1981	45	19 August 2026	Kolin,Czech Republic	90° Kolín Gran Prix	
W 45	54.56	Indrė Jakubaitytė	Lithuania	24 January 1976	45	20 May 2021	Birštonas, Lithuania	Throws Meeting	
W 45	55.69	Indrė Jakubaitytė	Lithuania	24 January 1976	46	12 June 2022	Klaipėda, Lithuania	Azuolas Masters Cup	
W 50	47.53	Felicia Ureche	Spain	29 September 1967	45	24 March 2018	Madrid, Spain	European Masters Championships indoor	
W 55	44.44	Natasa Bezjak	Slovenia	25 November 1945	56	21 August 2002	Potsdam, Germany	European Masters Championships	
W 60 500g	41.14	Genowefa Patla	Poland	17 October 1962	60	29 March 2023	Toruń, Poland	World Masters Championships	
W 60 400g	41.28	Gertraud Schönauer	Austria	27 February 1937	60	12 July 1997	Dasing, Germany	World Masters Championships	
W 65 500g	33.39	Anne Kristine Jensen	Denmark	20 June 1954	65	12 September 2019	Caorle, Italy	European Masters Championships	
W 65 400g	38.07	Evaun B. Williams	Great Britain	19 December 1937	68	27 July 2006	Poznań, Poland	European Masters Championships	
W 70 500g	34.83	Vanda Srbová Marušová	Czech Republic	8 December 1953	70	22 May 2024	Kladno, Czech Republic	Kladno hází a Kladenské Memoriály	
W 75	29.92	Evaun B. Williams	Great Britain	19 December 1937	75	22 October 2013	Porto Alegre, Brazil	World Masters Championships	
W 80	27.51	Evaun B. Williams	Great Britain	19 December 1937	81	27 March 2019	Toruń, Poland	World Masters Championships indoor	
W 80	22.85 (500g)	Evaun B. Williams	Great Britain	19 December 1937	80	11 June 2018	Stevenage, United Kingdom		
W 85	24.78	Evaun B. Williams	Great Britain	19 December 1937	86	19 August 2024	Gothenburg, Sweden	World Masters Championships	
W 90	15.32	Rosa Pedersen	Denmark	25 February 1930	90	22 August 2020	Greve, Denmark	DM Masters	
W 95	9.89	Nora Kutti	Estonia	9 October 1922	95	10 October 2017	Tartu, Estonia		

=== Weight throw women ===
Age group	Record	Athlete	Nationality	Birthdate	Age	Date	Place	Meet	Ref.
W 35	19.27	Vania Silva	Portugal	8 June 1980	38	14 July 2018	Leiria, Portugal		
W 40	19.40	Vania Silva	Portugal	8 June 1980	40	29 July 2020	Leiria, Portugal	Desafio Mundial de Masters Virtuais de 2020	
W 45	16.50	Gonny Mik	Netherlands	23 March 1965	49	13 September 2014	Rotterdam, Netherlands		
W 50	18.59	Andrea Jenkins	Great Britain	4 October 1975	50	10 October 2025	Madeira, Portugal	European Masters Championships	
W 55	17.50	Gonny Mik	Netherlands	23 March 1965	55	29 July 2020	Dissen, Germany	Senioren Werfertag	
W 60	18.90	Mirja Kokko	Finland	8 August 1961	60	29 May 2022	Kouvola, Finland	Throws Meet (HT and WT)	
W 65	17.34	Annie van Anholt	Netherlands	22 February 1947	67	22 March 2014	Roermond, Netherlands		
W 70	15.00	Jutta Schäfer	Germany	17 October 1931	72	10 March 2004	Sindelfingen, Germany	World Masters Championships Indoor	
W 70	15.10	Annie van Anholt	Netherlands	22 February 1947	71	27 January 2019	Sittard, Netherlands	International Throws Meeting	
W 75	16.03	Eva Nohl	Germany	27 November 1948	75	20 July 2024	Essingen, Germany	throws pentathlon	
W 80	13.84	Kirsti Viitanen	Finland	21 August 1942	80	6 August 2023	Lahti, Finland	Masters Throws Meet	
W 85	11.97	Evaun B. Williams	Great Britain	19 December 1937	86	22 August 2024	Gothenburg, Sweden	World Masters Championships	
W 90	8.57	Rosa Pedersen	Denmark	25 February 1930	92	27 August 2022	Ballerup, Denmark	NC Denmark Masters	
W 90	8.82	Hilja Bakhoff	Estonia	23 December 1926	90	18 February 2017	Viljandi, Estonia		
W 90	8.22	Hilja Bakhoff	Estonia	23 December 1926	90	30 May 2017	Viljandi, Estonia		
W 95	5.16	Nora Kutti	Estonia	9 October 1922	95	10 October 2017	Tartu, Estonia		

=== Throws pentathlon women ===
Age group	Record	Athlete	Nationality	Birthdate	Age	Date	Place	Meet	Ref.
W 35	3613 (old 4110)	Aria Slok Hansen	Denmark	8 January 1983	35	15 September 2018	Málaga Spain	World Masters Championships	
W 35		Hammer / Shot put / Discus / Javelin / Weight; 49.93m / 14.85m / 48.38m / 26.78m / 14.97m							
W 35	3672 (old 4257)	Wendy Koolhaas	Netherlands	5 January 1980	36	23 July 2016	Hilversum Netherlands		
W 35		Hammer / Shot put / Discus / Javelin / Weight; 59.69m / 12.59m / 38.60m / 33.28m / 16.89m							
W 40	3775	Aria Slok Hansen	Denmark	8 January 1983	40	28 September 2023	Pescara, Italy	European Masters Championships	
W 40		Hammer / Shot put / Discus / Javelin / Weight; 46.16m / 15.55m / 43.90m / 26.94m / 13.41m							
W 40	4248 (old 4867)	Wendy Koolhaas	Netherlands	5 January 1980	40	9 August 2020	Hilversum Netherlands		
W 40		Hammer / Shot put / Discus / Javelin / Weight; 59.82m / 13.18m / 40.62m / 35.97m / 17.89m							
W 45	3878	Tetyana Nasonova	Ukraine	15 December 1976	48	16 October 2025	Madeira, Portugal	European Masters Championships	
W 45		Hammer / Shot put / Discus / Javelin / Weight; 36.42m / 14.63m / 35.95m / 29.33m / 15.32m							
W 50	4022 (old 4646)	Ulrike Engelhardt	Germany	4 September 1959	50	21 August 2010	Bogen Germany		
W 50		Hammer / Shot put / Discus / Javelin / Weight; 45.55m / 12.23m / 39.24m / 34.28m / 15.24m							
W 55	4241e (old 4896e)	Evaun B. Williams	Great Britain	19 December 1937	56	11.06.94	Athens Greece	European Masters Championships	
W 55		Hammer / Shot put / Discus / Javelin / Weight; 43.50m / 12.13m / 27.38m / 36.22m* / 17.02m; * 400g javelin							
W 60	4364* (old 4987*)	Evaun B. Williams	Great Britain	19 December 1937	61	17 September 1998	Cesenatico Italy	European Masters Championships	
W 60		Hammer / Shot put / Discus / Javelin / Weight; 39.21m / 11.54m / 28.99m / 35.14m* / 16.23m; Note: javelin 400g							
W 65	4780 (old 5419)	Ann Kirstine Jensen	Denmark	20 June 1954	65	7 July 2019	Silkeborg Denmark	Throws Pentathlon Championships	
W 65		Hammer / Shot put / Discus / Javelin / Weight; 38.02m / 11.25m / 31.51m / 32.28m / 14.16m							
W 70	4967* (old 5683*)	Evaun B. Williams	Great Britain	19 December 1937	70	2 August 2008	Ljubljana Slovenia	European Masters Championships	
W 70		Hammer / Shot put / Discus / Javelin / Weight; 37.40m / 9.79m / 27.17m / 31.47m / 13.80m; Note: javelin 400g							
W 75	4465 (old 5528)	Evaun B. Williams	Great Britain	19 December 1937	75	25 October 2013	Porto Alegre Brazil	World Masters Championships	
W 75		Hammer / Shot put / Discus / Javelin / Weight; 36.61m / 10.45m / 26.75m / 24.73m / 12.43m							
W 80	4932 (old 6080)	Evaun B. Williams	Great Britain	19 December 1937	80	12 September 2018	Málaga Spain	World Masters Championships	
W 80		Hammer / Shot put / Discus / Javelin / Weight; 37.85m / 9.23m / 23.00m / 24.65m / 12.68m							
W 85	5150 (old 6316)	Evaun B. Williams	Great Britain	19 December 1937	85	26 September 2023	Pescara, Italy	European Masters Championships	
W 85		Hammer / Shot put / Discus / Javelin / Weight; 31.11m / 8.65m / 20.81m / 20.96m / 11.59m							
W 90	3227 (old 3942)	Hilja Bakhoff	Estonia	23 December 1926	90	5 August 2017	Aarhus, Denmark	European Masters Championships	
W 90		Hammer / Shot put / Discus / Javelin / Weight; 16.49m / 5.42m / 11.29m / 8.08m / 7.80m							
W 90	3639 (old 4437)	Hilja Bakhoff	Estonia	23 December 1926	90	13 May 2017	Mustla, Estonia		
W 90		Hammer / Shot put / Discus / Javelin / Weight; 17.96m / 6.00m / 13.47m / 8.45m / 8.52m							
W 95	3504 (old 4469)	Nora Kutti	Estonia	9 October 1922	95	10 October 2017	Tartu, Estonia		
W 95		Hammer / Shot put / Discus / Javelin / Weight; 11.63m / 4.76m / 10.98m / 9.89m / 5.16m							

=== Heptathlon women ===
Age group	Record	Athlete	Nationality	Birthdate	Age	Date	Place	Meet	Ref.
W 35	6622 (old 6860)	Sabine Braun	Germany	19 June 1965	37	10 August 2002	Munich, Germany	European Championships	
W 35	100m H (wind) / High jump / Shot put / 200m (wind) / Long jump (wind) / Javelin / 800m; 13.58 (−0.3 m/s) / 1.80 m / 14.56 m / 24.69 (−0.1 m/s) / 6.50 m (+1.9 m/s) / 51.23 m / 2:23.24								
W 40	5964	Beatrice Puiu	Romania	22 March 1986	40	25 August 2026	Daegu, South Korea	World Masters Championships	
W 40	80m H (wind) / High jump / Shot put / 200m (wind) / Long jump (wind) / Javelin / 800m; 11.30 (+0.9 m/s) / 1.68 m / 13.35 m / 26.56 (−0.1 m/s) / 5.42 m (−0.1 m/s) / 34.94 m / 2:35.55								
W 45	5856 (old 6082)	Tatyana Schilling	Germany	5 October 1970	48	8 September 2019	Caorle, Italy	European Masters Championships	
W 45	80m H (wind) / High jump / Shot put / 200m (wind) / Long jump (wind) / Javelin / 800m; 12.34 (+0.1 m/s) / 1.60 m / 10.86 m / 27.05 (−1.4 m/s) / 5.26 m (+0.6 m/s) / 31.06 m / 2:38.83								
W 50	6165	Tatyana Schilling	Germany	5 October 1970	52	24 September 2023	Pescara, Italy	European Masters Championships	
W 50	80m H (wind) / High jump / Shot put / 200m (wind) / Long jump (wind) / Javelin / 800m; 12.87 (−0.1 m/s) / 1.54 m / 12.28 m / 27.10 (+1.1 m/s) / 5.05 m (+0.3 m/s) / 32.25 m / 2:38.54								
W 55	6420	Tatjana Schilling	Germany	5 October 1970	55	12 October 2025	Madeira, Portugal	European Masters Championships	
W 55		80m H (wind) / High jump / Shot put / 200m (wind) / Long jump (wind) / Javelin / 800m; 13.11 (−2.2 m/s) / 1.50 m / 10.85 m / 27.99 (−1.1 m/s) / 4.78 m (+1.0 m/s) / 33.35 m / 2:41.61							
W 60	6826	Barbara Gähling	Germany	20 January 1965	60	9 June 2025	Limburgerhof, Germany	33. Nationale Pfingst-Mehrkämpfe Limburgerhof	
W 60	80m H (wind) / High jump / Shot put / 200m (wind) / Long jump (wind) / Javelin / 800m; 13.51 (+2.4 m/s) / 1.48 m / 12.40 m / 29.27 (+1.0 m/s) / 4.26 m (−0.5 m/s) / 32.24 m / 2:41.03								
W 65	5788	Maria Rosa Escribano Checa	Spain	29 December 1958	65	14 July 2024	Tarragona, Spain	Catalunya Masters Championships Multiple Events	
W 65	80m H (wind) / High jump / Shot put / 200m (wind) / Long jump (wind) / Javelin / 800m; 14.12 (±0.0 m/s) / 1.33 m / 8.82 m / 33.35 (+0.9 m/s) / 3.95 m (±0.0 m/s) / 21.45 m / 3:03.29								
W 70	5291* (old 6253*)	Marianne Maier	Austria	25 December 1942	70	17.10.13	Porto Alegre Brazil	World Masters Championships	
W 70	80m H (wind) / High jump / Shot put / 200m (wind) / Long jump (wind) / Javelin / 800m; 16.04 (−0.9 m/s) / 1.18 m / 10.31 m / 34.47 (+0.5 m/s) / 3.51 m (−0.3 m/s) / 19.30 m / 4:03.07; note: javelin 400g								
W 75	5436 (old 6870)	Riet Jonkers	Netherlands	4 October 1943	75	2 June 2019	Stendal Germany	Stendaler Hanse-Cup	
W 75	80m H (wind) / High jump / Shot put / 200m (wind) / Long jump (wind) / Javelin / 800m; 17.73 (+0.1 m/s) / 1.12 m / 8.49 m / 35.32 (+0.3 m/s) / 3.24 m (+1.5 m/s) / 15.31 m / 3:12.73								
W 80	4124	Riet Jonkers	Netherlands	4 October 1943	80	6 July 2024	Best Netherlands	National Masters Championships Multiple Events	
W 80	80m H (wind) / High jump / Shot put / 200m (wind) / Long jump (wind) / Javelin / 800m; DNF / 1.02 m / 7.78 m / 39.81 (+0.8 m/s) / 2.85 m (±0.0 m/s) / 12.16 m / 3:40.59								

=== 4 × 100 metres relay women ===
Age group	Record	Athlete	Nationality	Birthdate	Age	Date	Place	Meet	Ref.
W 35	48.12	Sara Wiss, Paulina Orell Sahlberg, Anna Björkstedt, Elin Bjerre	Sweden	03.02.1987; 12.04.1981; 26.04.1978; 24.07.1986		9 July 2022	Tampere, Finland	World Masters Championships	
W 40	48.22	Caroline Aubert-Cadinot, Nicole Barilly, Nadine Valouvin, Violetta Lapierre	France	18.01.1964; 09.01.1960; 18.05.1964; 15.10.1963		24 June 2006	Le Touquet, France	Masters France vs Belgique vs GBR	
W 45	49.33	Joelle Zongo, Nicole Barilly-Alexis, Dominique Vouagner, Violetta Lapierre	France	02.03.1961; 09.01.1960; 03.09.1964; 15.10.1963		24 July 2010	Nyiregyhaza, Hungary	European Masters Championships	
W 50	50.83 (Note: W50 category by official result source; W65 by EMA source, a typo)	Agnese Claudia Rossi, Cristina Sanulli, Michela Borscia, Denise Caroline Neumann	Italy	25.03.1971; 21.11.1972; 19.07.1973; 14.01.1971	52; 52; 54; 52	25 September 2023	Pescara, Italy	European Masters Championships	
W 55	53.84	Juliet Sidney, Diane Wright, Stefanie Dornbusch, Christine Harrison	Great Britain	28.01.1968; 20.07.1969; 24.09.1969; 12.02.1968		18 October 2025	Madeira, Portugal	European Masters Championships	
W 60	55.77	Erika Drecoll, Gerti Reichert, Elfriede Hofmann, Brunhilde Hoffman	Germany	02.07.1937; 31.12.1938; 14.07.1938; 17.08.1939		9 July 2000	Jyväskylä, Finland	European Masters Championships	
W 65	60.31	Petra Zörner, Rita Buchholz, Gertrude Reismann, Ingrid Meier	Germany	22.11.1946; 10.07.1950; 27.08.1947; 01.04.1947		16 August 2015	Lyon, France	World Masters Championships	
W 70	64.28	Karin Förster, Petra Zörner, Karin Stump, Ingrid Meier	Germany	12.08.1946; 22.11.1946; 09.12.1945; 01.04.1947		5 August 2017	Aarhus, Denmark	European Masters Championships	
W 75	1:11.56	Kathleen Stewart, Sally Hine, Sarah Roberts, Emily McMahon	Germany	07.08.1939; 01.12.1949; 06.10-1949; 25.04.1950		18 October 2025	Madeira, Portugal	European Masters Championships	
W 80	1:34.56	Varpu Holmbeg; Inkeri Fält; Maatta Taipala; Seija Sario	Finland	22.09.1941; 04.10.1940; 08.04.1939; 12.12.1940		9 July 2022	Tampere, Finland	World Masters Championships	
W 85									

=== 4 × 400 metres relay women ===
Age group	Record	Athlete	Nationality	Birthdate	Age	Date	Place	Meet	Ref.	Video
W 35	3:50.80	Virginia Mitchell, Jennie Mathews, Angela Beadnall, Linda Gabriel	Great Britain	29.01.1963; 03.07.1962; 01.08.1959; 21.07.1964		8 August 1999	Gateshead, United Kingdom	WAVA Championships		
W 40	3:56.02	Martina Seidel, Irena Gazda Sagolla, Martina Kroener, Brigitte Heidrich	Germany	05.02.1962; 25.04.1961; 17.04.1960; 03.07.1961		25 August 2002	Potsdam, Germany	European Masters Athletics Championships		
W 45	4:05.96	Jutta Bergener, Kerstin Drewes-Czech, Eva Trost, Tatyana Schilling	Germany	. .1969; 08.10.1971; 30.01.1968; 05.10.1970		16 September 2018	Málaga, Spain	World Masters Athletics Championships		
W 50	4:10.80	Laura Mahady, Jane Horder, Joylyn Saunders-Mullins, Caroline Ann Powell	Great Britain	20.02.1958; 18.01.1957; 27.11.1952; 21.12.1953		8 August 2009	Lahti, Finland	World Masters Athletics Championships		
W 55	4:27.33	Julie Rogers, Christine Anthony, Janice Ellacott, Virginia Mitchell	Great Britain	15.01.1964; 26.01.1963; 05.11.1960; 29.01.1963		15 September 2019	Caorle, Italy	European Masters Championships		
W 60	4:30.03	Lisa Margareth Thomas, Christine Anthony, Janice Ellacott, Virginia Mitchell	Great Britain	28.03.1965; 26.01.1963; 05.11.1960; 29.01.1963		19 October 2025	Madeira, Portugal	European Masters Championships		
W 65	5:00.12	Caroline Marler, Rosalind Tabor, Joylyn Saunders-Mullins, Caroline Powell	Great Britain	25.12.1950; 06.08.1949; 27.11.1952; 21.12.1963		15 September 2019	Caorle, Italy	European Masters Athletics Championships		
W 70	5:53.62	Hermine Staubermann, Erika Sauer, Viktoria Zickert, Hannelore Venn	Germany	06.12.1940; 12.01.1940; 01.09.1941; 09.01.1942		25 August 2012	Zittau, Germany	European Masters Athletics Championships		
W 75	7:25.65	Kathleen Stewart, Betty Stracey, Anne Martin, Dorothy Fraser	Great Britain	07.08.1939; 20.09.1939; 09.01.1936; 08.03.1937		6 November 2016	Perth, Australia	World Masters Athletics Championships		
W 80										

=== 4 × 800 metres relay women ===
Age group	Record	Athlete	Nationality	Birthdate	Age	Date	Place	Meet	Ref.
W 35-39									
W 40-49									
W 50-59									
W 60-69									
W 70-79	14:55.88	Ursula Lammet, Reintraut Rattay, Hermi Staubermann, Lydia Ritter	Germany	..41; 03.05.43; 06.12.40; 08.11.38		27.09.13	Essen-Stoppenberg, Germany		

=== 5000 metres race walk women ===
Age group	Record	Athlete	Nationality	Birthdate	Age	Date	Place	Meet	Ref.
W 35	20:12.41	Elisabetta Perrone	Italy	3 July 1968	35	2 August 2003	Rieti, Italy	Italian Championships	
W 40	22:45.93	Rossella Giordano	Italy	1 December 1972	40	24 April 2013	Milan, Italy	Walk & Middle Distance Night	
W 45	23:32.47	Maria Josè Poves Novella	Spain	16 March 1978	45	15 July 2023	Pamplona, Spain	Campeonato de España de Federaciones Autonómicas	
W 45	23:24.96	Rosetta La Delfa	Italy	14 July 1977	48	5 September 2025	Bra, Italy	Memorial Franco Florio	
W 50	23:46.2 h	Siw Ibanez Karlström	Sweden	9 July 1957	54	30 July 2011	Kalmar, Sweden	Swedish Championships	
W 55	23:57.58	Siw Ibanez Karlström	Sweden	9 July 1957	55	1 September 2012	Gothenburg, Sweden	Walk Match SWE vs FIN	
W 60	25:41.20	Siw Ibanez Karlström	Sweden	9 July 1957	61	25 August 2018	Eskilstuna, Sweden	Swedish Championships	
W 65	28:25.8 h	Heidi Maeder	Switzerland	23 October 1943	65	26 September 2009	Lausanne, Switzerland		
W 65	27:42.31	Marie-Astrid Monmessin	France	5 February 1956	65	9 July 2021	Remiremont, France	Meeting des trois grands	
W 70	29:16.0 h	Britta Tibbling	Sweden	10 March 1918	71	21 July 1989	San Diego, United States	USATF Masters Championships	
W 75	32:44.76	Britta Tibbling	Sweden	10 March 1918	75	16 October 1993	Miyazaki, Japan	World Masters Championships	
W 80	34:48.48	Britta Tibbling	Sweden	10 March 1918	81	6 August 1999	Gateshead, United Kingdom	World Masters Championships	
W 85	40:13.37	Aina Engberg	Sweden	2 February 1923	85	1 September 2008	Malmö, Sweden	European Masters Games	
W 90	44:28.33	Elena Pagu	Romania	25 July 1926	90	27 October 2016	Perth, Australia	World Masters Championships	

=== 20 km race walk women ===
Age group	Record	Athlete	Nationality	Birthdate	Age	Date	Place	Meet	Ref.
W 35	1:25:41	Olimpiada Ivanova	Russia	5 May 1970	35	7 August 2005	Helsinki, Finland	World Championships	
W 40	1:29:16	Antigoni Ntrismpioti	Greece	21 March 1984	40	1 March 2025	Taicang, China	National Race Walking Grand Prix	
W 45	1:39:55	Rosetta La Delfa	Italy	14 July 1977	45	19 March 2023	Frosinone, Italy	Italian 20 km Race Walk Championships	
W 50	1:48:53	Nadine Mazuir	France	16 March 1960	51	15 May 2011	Thionville, France	European Masters Athletics Championships Non Stadia	
W 50	1:47:20	Nadine Mazuir	France	16 March 1960	51	17 April 2011	Saint-Renan, France		
W 55	1:47:23	Siw Ibanez Karlström	Sweden	9 July 1957	56	5 October 2013	Eskilstuna, Sweden		
W 60	1:55:39	Sandra Brown	Great Britain	1 April 1949	61	15 August 2009	Lee Valley, United Kingdom		
W 65	1:58:58	Heidi Maeder	Switzerland	23 October 1943	65	5 May 2009	Metz, France		
W 70	2:14:49	Heidi Maeder	Switzerland	23 October 1943	71	14 August 2015	Lyon, France	World Masters Championships	
W 75	2:30:30	Hannele Kivisto	Finland	24 August 1943	75	10 September 2018	Málaga, Spain	World Masters Championships	
W 80	2:42:27	Denise Leclerc	France	10 October 1933	80	26 October 2013	Porto Alegre, Brazil	World Masters Championships	
W 80	2:33:57	Franca Maria Monasterolo	Italy	26 September 1943	82	26 October 2025	Alessandria, Italy	Italian Masters Race Walking Championships	

== See also ==
- List of world records in masters athletics
- United States records in masters athletics
- Italian records in masters athletics
