= 2024 World Masters Athletics Championships =

Coordinates: 57.677778°N 11.939444°E

- Dates: 13-25 August 2024
- Host city: Gothenburg, Sweden
- Venue: Slottsskogsvallen
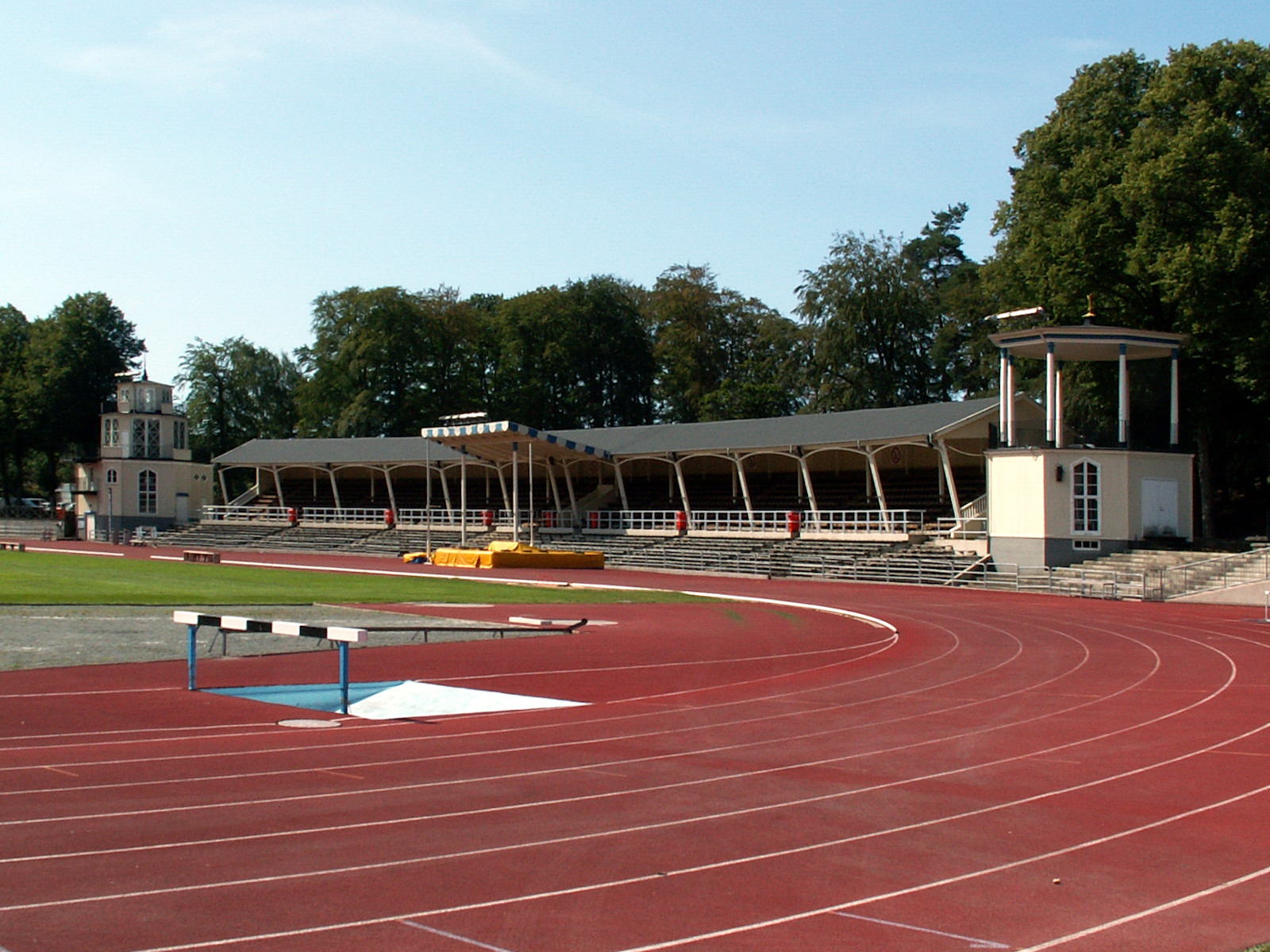
- Level: Masters
- Type: Outdoor
- Participation: 8028 athletes from 110 nations
- Official website: www.2024wmac.com

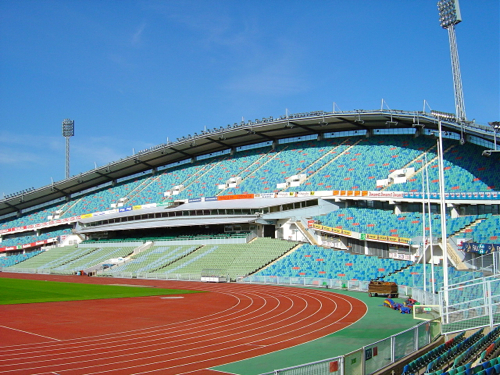
Ullevi Stadium

2024 World Masters Athletics Championships was the 25th in a series of World Masters Athletics Outdoor Championships (WMAC) that took place in Gothenburg, Sweden from 13 to 25 August 2024. These Championships were originally scheduled for 2023, but was postponed due to the COVID-19 pandemic.

The main venue was Slottsskogsvallen. Supplemental venues included Ullevi Stadium, Björlanda Athletics Center "invented thanks to the WMAC", Slottsskogen City Park for Road Walks, Half Marathon, and Cross Country, and House of Athletics for training and preparations. There was a total of 8028 participants from 110 countries competing. 64 events were held, 32 for woman and 32 for men. USA headed the medal table on 110 gold medals. 24 world records were set or equaled

This Championships was organized by World Masters Athletics (WMA) in coordination with a Local Organising Committee (LOC). The WMA is the global governing body of the sport of athletics for athletes 35 years of age or older, setting rules for masters athletics competition.

== World champions ==
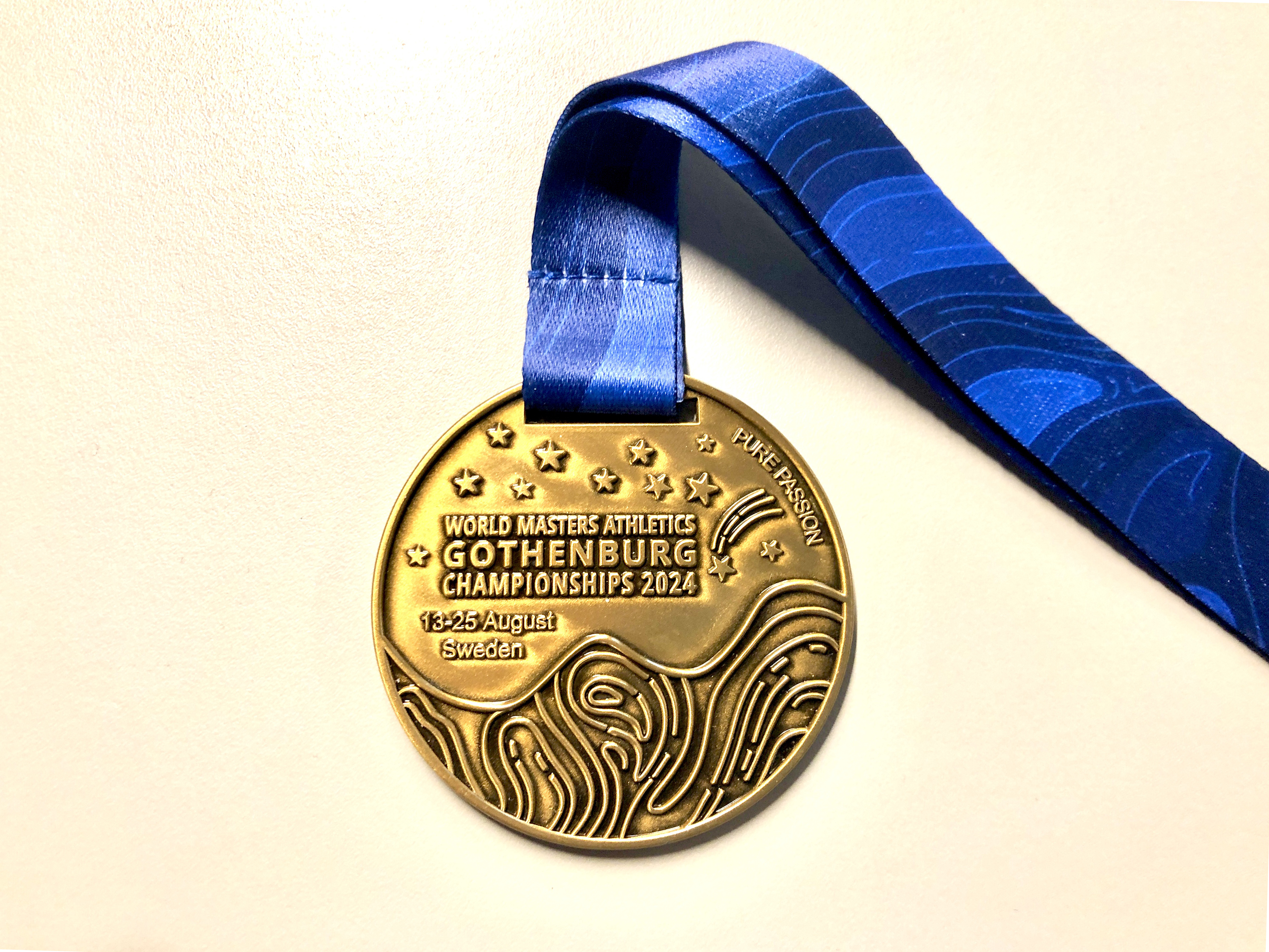
Gold medal with championship's logo

According to sources

=== Men ===
==== 100 m ====
Category	Winner	Result
M35	USA Charles Jackson	10.91
M40	USA Antoine Echols	10.85
M45	GBR Jochen Gippert	10.98
M50	USA Garth Robinson	11.23
M55	USA Arif Husain	11.70
M60	USA Francois Boda	12.08
M65	USA John Wright	12.43
M70	USA Ron Stevens	12:83
M75	JPN Yoshio Aiba	14.21
M80	GER Karl Schmid	14.88
M85	GER Friedhelm Adorf	16.50
M90	MGL Radnaa Tseren	17.51
M95	GRE Konstantinos Chatziemmanouil	24.73

==== 200 m ====
Category	Winner	Result
M35	KSA Shaker Salim	21.70
M40	USA Rondrick Parker	22.33
M45	GER Jochen Gippert	22.26
M50	GBR Mike Coogan	23.04
M55	GBR Darren Scott	23.63
M60	USA Francois Boda	24.26
M65	GBR John Wright	25.61
M70	USA Thomas Jones	27.01
M75	ITA Livio Bugiardini	29.64
M80	GER Friedhelm Adorf	30.52
M85	AUS David Chantrill	36.57
M90	MGL Radnaa Tseren	37.24
M95	GRE Konstantinos Chatziemmanouil	57.12

==== 400 m ====
Category	Winner	Result
M35	KSA Yousef Masrahi	47.59
M40	POL Jakub Adamczyk	49.28
M45	ARG Diego Martin Silvera	51.89
M50	USA Ian Weakley	52.81
M55	BAH Timothy Munnings	53.05
M60	GER Roland Gröger	53.93
M65	GBR John Wright	56.22
M70	GBR Ian Broadhurst	1:04.13
M75	ITA Livio Bugiardini	1:06.59
M80	IRL John MacDermott	1:15.02
M85	AUS David Chantril	1:36.42
M90	MGL Radnaa Tseren	1:29.72
M95	GRE Konstantinos Chatziemmanouil	2:32.33

==== 800 m ====
Category	Winner	Result
M35	KSA Mohammad Shaween	1:49.90
M40	ESP Pablo Muñoz Caballero	1:59.87
M45	ARG Diego Martin Silvera	1:58.65
M50	USA Brian Tullis	1:57.98
M55	GBR Mark Symes	2:05.38
M60	GBR Andrew Ridley	2:09.67
M65	GBR Paul Forbes	2:19.12
M70	RSA Warren Schmelzer	2:24.49
M75	USA Nolan Shaheed	2:39.57
M80	FRA Jean-Louis Esnault	3:03.42
M85	GER Willi Klaus	3:54.21
M90	MGL Radnaa Tseren	3:43.15
M95	GRE Konstantinos Chatziemmanouil	5:46.82

==== 1500 m ====
Category	Winner	Result
M35	KSA Mohammad Shaween	3:51.08
M40	SWE Martin Öhman	4:05.22
M45	GBR Kojo Kyereme	4:10.71
M50	ESP Antonio Franco Raimondez	4:11.94
M55	GBR Mark Symes	4:17.45
M60	GBR Andrew Ridley	4:24.23
M65	USA Daniel King	4:49.47
M70	LAT Peteris Arents	5:18.61
M75	USA Nolan Shaheed	5:47.84
M80	FRA Jean-Louis Esnault	6:42.64
M85	GER Hansjörg Kuppardt	8:02.78
M90	MGL Radnaa Tseren	8:07.23

==== 5000 m ====
Category	Winner	Result
M35	USA Mark Husted	15:03.67
M40	MEX Juan Luis Barrios Nieves	14:29.44
M45	SWE Mustafa Mohamed	14:41.30
M50	KEN Francis Kipkoech Bowen	15:51.38
M55	NED Peter van der Velden	16:20.48
M60	GBR Andrew Leach	16:59.67
M65	NED Alex Stienstra	17:27.40
M70	LUX Victor Kiessel	19:05.34
M75	NED Bartholomeus Schalkwijk	20:39.34
M80	GBR Peter Giles	23:58.07
M85	GER Fokke Kramer	24:24.94
M90	USA Colben Keith Sime	42:49.68

==== 3000 metres steeplechase / 2000 metres steeplechase ====
Categories M35 to M55: 3000 m. M60 and over: 2000 m.

Category	Winner	Result
M35	SWE Fredrik Johansson	9:21:50
M40	ESP Diego De la Fuente Ibañez	9:15.37
M45	GBR Grant Baillie	9:45.54
M50	CZE Jaroslav Vítek	10:20.50
M55	FRA Pascal Ruiz	10:26.54
M60	NZL Peter Stevens	7:50.70
M65	ESP Cesar Pérez Rodriguez	7:41.38
M70	RSA Warren Schmelzer	8:00.61
M75	AUS Allan Mayfield	8:50.26
M80	ESP Emilio de la Cámara	10:42.51
M85	IND Ram Kanwar Sangwan	15:34.58

==== 110 metres hurdles / 100 metres hurdles / 80 metres hurdles ====
Categories M35 to M45: 110 m. M50–M65: 100 m. M70 and over: 80 m.

Category	Winner	Result
M35	KSA Shaker Salim	14:25
M40	HKG Chi Cheong Leung	15:11
M45	GBR Mensah Elliott	15:00
M50	GBR Joe Appiah	14:13
M55	CAN Yannick Le Mouël	15:05
M60	NED Wan Bakx	15:82
M65	POL Wiesław Musiał	15:83
M70	CAN Ward Hazen	13:16
M75	LAT Valdis Cela	15:13
M80	IRL John MacDermott	16:25
M85	USA Emil Pawlik	20:08

==== 400 metres hurdles / 300 metres hurdles / 200 metres hurdles ====
Categories M35 to M55: 400 m. M60–M65: 300 m. M70 and over: 200 m.

Category	Winner	Result
M35	POL Radosław Czyż	52.70
M40	POL Jakub Adamczyk	53.76
M45	AUS Ryan Dowling	57.18
M50	USA Ian Weakley	54.91
M55	FRA Antoine Abatuci	1:02.20
M60	DEN Bernardo Bengtsson	44.42
M65	USA Ronald Humphrey	45.61
M70	GBR Ian Broadhurst	47.99
M75	JPN Yoshio Aiba	54.00
M80	IRL John MacDermott	36.06
M85	GBR Alan Carter	57:30

==== 4 × 100 metres relay ====
Category	Zwycięzcy	Result
M35	GBR Isaiah Adekanmbi; GBR Byron Robinson; GBR Craig Cox; GBR Duayne Bovell	42.35
M40	USA Marcus Allen Barnes; USA Antoine Echols; USA Rondrick Parker; USA Durran Dunn	42.71
M45	AUS Ashley McMahon; AUS Ryan Dowling; AUS Graham Scully; AUS Mark Harper	44.54
M50	JPN Masashi Sato; JPN Masato Minakuchi; JPN Hiroaki Akabori; JPN Takeshi Fukuzato	44.08
M55	USA Reggie Pendland; USA Arif Husain; USA Lloyd Hightower; USA David Gibbon	45.07
M60	GER Andreas Groneberg; GER Ted Spitzer; GER Robert Beer; GER Roland Gröger	49.32
M65	GER Frank Kindermann; GER Andreas Weise; GER Kurt Fischer; GER Gerhard Zorn	51.98
M70	USA Thomas Jones; USA Michael Kish; USA Steven Snow; USA Ron Stevens	51.12
M75	GER Dieter Müller; GER Horst Simons; GER Ulrich Becker; GER Friedhelm Adorf	59.29
M80	GBR Melvyn James; GBR James Smith; GBR Peter Giles; GBR Allan Long	1:04.98
M85	GER Gerhard Adams; GER Klaus-Dieter Lange; GER Karl Schmid; GER Willi Klaus	1:08.78

==== 4 × 400 metres relay ====
Category	Zwycięzcy	Result
M35	GBR Damaine Benjamin; GBR Craig Cox; GBR Lewis Robson; GBR Dale Willis	3:16.53
M40	POL Krzysztof Guzowski; POL Karol Górny; POL Bartosz Porzuczek; POL Jakub Adamczyk	3:26.55
M45	IRL Ger Cremin; IRL Carlton Haddock; IRL Keith William Pollard; IRL Jim Phelan	3:33.63
M50	USA Adeniran Epebinuade; USA Peter Haack; USA David Henry; USA Ian Weakley	3:31.85
M55	USA John Curtis; USA Chris McDonald; USA John Cormier; USA Arif Husain	3:45.89
M60	GER Ted Spitzer; GER Peter Oberliessen; GER Rainer Strehle; GER Roland Gröger	3:51.19
M65	GBR Tennyson James; GBR Martin Phillips; GBR Steven Taylor; GBR John Wright	4:14.10
M70	USA David Ortman; USA Russell Jacquet-Acea; USA Steven Phillips; USA Thomas Jones	4:27.72
M75	FIN Taisto Pietilä; FIN Ahti Finning; FIN Teuvo Mettälä; FIN Heikki Pesonen	5:14.59
M80	GER Manfred Riedel; GER Werner Götze; GER Hans-Jürgen Rösner; GER Friedhelm Adorf	6:38.52
M85	IND Chinnaswamy Veetuvampalayam Shankar; IND Rajendran Thangappanadar Dharmaraj; IND Subramanian Kunjunair; IND Joseph Mattathil Samuel	12:24.13

==== High jump ====
Category	Winner	Result
M35	SWE Philip Frifelt Lundqvist	1.95
M40	CZE Ladislav Urban	1.90
M45	POR Roman Guliy	1.85
M50	JPN Yoshihisa Fukumoto	1.85
M55	GRE Georgios Farmakis	1.75
M60	GER Rüdiger Weber	1.76
M65	USA Bruce McBarnettey	1.55
M70	NOR Ulf Stephen Tudem	1.43
M75	SLO Dusan Prezelj	1.45
M80	EST Juhan Tennasilm	1.23
M85	GER Willi Klaus	1.22

==== Pole vault ====
Category	Winner	Result
M35	GER Dennis Schober	5.11
M40	POL Przemysław Czerniak	4.60
M45	USA Denis Kholev	4.65
M50	SWE Jonas Asplund	4.65
M55	FIN Antti Kois	3.95
M60	USA Chet Clodfelter	3.55
M65	USA Wendell Beck	3.70
M70	CZE Ivo Strnad	2.85
M75	FIN Jarmo Arto Lipasti	2.95
M80	GER Siegbert Gnoth	2.25
M85	NOR Knut Henrik Skramstad	1.87

==== Long jump ====
Category	Winner	Result
M35	KUW Saleh Al-Haddad	7.08
M40	KSA Ahmed Binmarzouq	7.07
M45	POL Łukasz Sobora	6.70
M50	USA Lee Adkins	6.30
M55	USA John Wise	6.08
M60	ITA Gianni Becatti	6.01
M65	POL Wiesław Musiał	5.27
M70	ROU Adrian Neagu	4.95
M75	SWE Olle Borg	4.70
M80	GER Eberhard Linke	4.45
M85	GER Karl Schmid	3.27
M95	GRE Konstantinos Chatziemmanouil	1.45

==== Triple jump ====
Category	Winner	Result
M35	FIN Antti Inkinen	14.53
M40	CUB Jairo Yosman Guibert Delis	15.02
M45	POL Łukasz Sobora	13.71
M50	SWE Mattias Sunneborn	13.25
M55	PUR Jose Escalera	12.56
M60	JPN Manabu Nakazawa	12.05
M65	POL Wiesław Musiał	10.96
M70	GER Klemens Grißmer	9.94
M75	SWE Olle Borg	9.80
M80	GER Eberhard Linke	8.93
M85	AUT Hans Miekautsch	6.16
M90	MGL Radnaa Tseren	5.70

==== Shot put ====
Categories M35 to M45: 7.26 kg. M50–M55: 6 kg. M60–M65: 5 kg. M70–M75: 4 kg. M80 and over: 3 kg.

Category	Winner	Result
M35	DEN Kenneth Mertz	16.16
M40	RSA Ameen Alarad	15.05
M45	EST Fred Vali	15.92
M50	GER Andy Dittmar	18.15
M55	CZE Pavel Peňáz	15.75
M60	USA David Scott Eriksson	16.74
M65	POL Ryszard Zglenicki	13.49
M70	USA Quenton Torbert	14.88
M75	NOR Arild Busterud	12.78
M80	POL Czesław Franciszek Roszczak	11.34
M85	GER Roland Heiler	12.06
M90	SWE David Bonnedahl	7.86
M100	IND Sriramulu Vallabhajosyula	2.63

==== Discus throw ====
Categories M35 to M45: 2 kg. M50–M55: 1.5 kg. M60 over: 1 kg.

Category	Winner	Result
M35	NED Stephan Dekker	53.19
M40	USA Niklas Arrhenius	57.30
M45	USA James Dennis	50.60
M50	NOR Bjørn Terje Pay	54.02
M55	CZE Pavel Peňáz	48.52
M60	GER Norbert Demmel	59.52
M65	GBR John Moreland	51.42
M70	NOR Kjell Adamski	43.52
M75	CZE Miloš Gryc	39.74
M80	ESP Julio Calvo Redondo	33.06
M85	GER Roland Heiler	32.98
M90	SWE David Bonnedahl	18.07
M100	IND Sriramulu Vallabhajosyula	5.54

==== Hammer throw ====
Categories M35 to M45: 7.26 kg. M50–M55: 6 kg. M60–M65: 5 kg. M70–M75: 4 kg. M80 and over: 3 kg.

Category	Winner	Result
M35	USA Ja'Mar Watson	57.83
M40	POL Bartosz Gołdyn	56.25
M45	ALB Dorian Çollaku	58.80
M50	POL Mariusz Walczak	67.17
M55	GER Ralf Jossa	63.07
M60	GER Christian Eckert	55.13
M65	AUT Gottfried Gassenbauer	53.18
M70	GRE Vasileios Manganas	48.66
M75	NOR Arild Busterud	45.43
M80	AUT Heimo Viertbauer	49.23
M85	SWE Östen Edlund	28.04
M90	GER Wendelin Acker	21.52

==== Weight throw ====
Categories M35 to M45: 15.88 kg. M50–M55: 11.34 kg. M60–M65: 9.08 kg. M70–M75: 7.26 kg. M80 and over: 5.45 kg.

Category	Winner	Result
M35	USA Ja'Mar Watson	16.76
M40	FIN Juhana Mäkelä	17.96
M45	ALB Dorian Çollaku	17.31
M50	POL Mariusz Walczak	21.78
M55	BEL Laurent Bettolo	21.02
M60	GER Norbert Demmel	19.49
M65	AUT Gottfried Gassenbauer	18.31
M70	GER Gerhard Hoffmann	17.68
M75	POL Stanisław Kmiecik	16.36
M80	SWE Peter Hackenschmidt	16.98
M85	SWE Östen Edlund	11.61
M90	GER Wendelin Acker	9.69

==== Javelin throw ====
Categories M35 to M45: 800 g. M50–M55: 700 g. M60–M65: 600 g. M70–M75: 500 g. M80 and over: 400 g.

Category	Winner	Result
M35	SWE Alexander Ottosson	63.34
M40	GER Stephan Steding	61.16
M45	SWE Stellan Per Back	62.20
M50	ITA Carlo Sonego	61.69
M55	FIN Tommi Huotilainen	55.65
M60	FRA Alain Guicharrousse	55.34
M65	UKR Serhii Havras	45.42
M70	USA Joseph Greenberg	45.01
M75	FIN Esa Kiuru	45.05
M80	GER Siegbert Gnoth	33.92
M85	FIN Jouni Eerik Tenhu	40.09
M90	SWE David Bonnedahl	17.49
M100	IND Sriramulu Vallabhajosyula	6.02

==== Throws pentathlon ====
Category	Winner	Result
M35	FIN Jussi Tukeva	3215
M40	GBR James Taylor	3813
M45	EST Fred Vali	3757
M50	GER Ralf Mordhorst	3860
M55	CZE Pavel Peňáz	4284
M60	GER Norbert Demmel	4553
M65	LTU Saulius Svilainis	3976
M70	FIN Keijo Aaltonen	4008
M75	CZE Miloš Gryc	3600
M80	SWE Peter Hackenschmidt	3575
M85	SWE Östen Edlund	3568
M90	SWE David Bonnedahl	2981

==== Decathlon ====
Category	Winner	Result
M35	USA Connor Williamson	7017
M40	GER Matti Herrmann	6924
M45	FIN Simo Piispa	6897
M50	FIN Henry Andberg	6590
M55	AUT Christopher Kurt Schiefermayer	7215
M60	GER Gerd Westphal	7199
M65	SWE Michael Cocke	7134
M70	CAN Ward Hazen	6654
M75	FIN Jarmo Arto Lipasti	6813
M80	NOR Trond Einar Furuly	6392
M85	GER Willi Klaus	5653

==== 5000 metres race walk ====
Category	Winner	Result
M35	POL Maher Ben Hlima	20:41.24
M40	ESP Juan Manuel Morales del Castillo	20:53.71
M45	KEN Erick Maugo Sikuku	21:48.54
M50	CAN Dmitry Babenko	23:16.48
M55	ESP Miguel Angel Carvajal Ortega	23:44.13
M60	USA Allen James	24:40.44
M65	CZE Miloslav Lapka	25:36.78
M70	FRA Patrice Brochot	29:04.76
M75	GBR Ian Richards	30:25.35
M80	CAN Ernie Kurtz	35:24.05
M85	CAN Hervé Leblanc	38:18.77
M90	SWE Ingvar Nilsson	35:24.05

==== 10 kilometres race walk ====
Category	Winner	Result
M35	POL Maher Ben Hlima	42:57
M40	ESP Juan Manuel Morales del Castillo	44:32
M45	KEN Erick Maugo Sikuku	44:16
M50	MEX Etiel Soto Maldonado	48:48
M55	ESP Miguel Angel Carvajal Ortega	49:47
M60	ESP Miguel Periáñez García	50:38
M65	CZE Miloslav Lapka	52:10
M70	FRA Patrice Brochot	1:00:14
M75	GBR Ian Richards	1:01:45
M80	GER Wolf-Dieter Giese	1:13:40
M85	CAN Hervé Leblanc	1:19:20

==== 10 kilometres race walk – teams ====
Category	Winner	Result
M35	POL Maher Ben Hlima; POL Krzysztof Czerski; POL Tomasz Lipiec	2:22:24
M40	POL Sebastian Karpiński; POL Konrad Morawczyński; POL Piotr Siwiński	2:45:20
M45	FRA Roland Landron; FRA Brian Munoz; FRA David Stefanelly	2:42:16
M50	SWE Erik Bengtsson; SWE Kristian Klevbom; SWE Christer Svensson	2:48:39
M55	USA Allen James; USA Michael Stauch; USA David Swarts	2:38:32
M60	ESP Pedro Jose Aranda Fernandez; ESP Miguel Periáñez García; ESP Adolfo Garcia Marin	2:42:24
M65	ITA Edoardo Alfieri; ITA Gabriele Caldarelli; ITA Franco Venturi Degli Esposti	3:00:04
M70	MEX Jose Luis Lopez Camarena; MEX Manuel De Jesus Hernandez Perez; MEX Abel Llamas Zamorano	3:09:50
M75	ITA Mario Fiori; ITA Ettorino Formentin; ITA Roberto Piaser	3:22:25
M80	CAN Marcel Jobin; CAN Ernie Kurtz; CAN Hervé Leblanc	3:53:07

==== 20 kilometres race walk ====
Category	Zwycięzcy	Result
M35	POL Maher Ben Hlima	1:30:53
M40	MEX David Cristian Berdeja Villavicencio	1:37:16
M45	NED André van Slooten	1:44:51
M50	CAN Dmitry Babenko	1:39:01
M55	ESP Miguel Angel Carvajal Ortega	1:44:25
M60	ESP Miguel Periáñez García	1:47:43
M65	ITA Edoardo Alfieri	1:56:42
M70	FRA Patrice Brochot	2:05:32
M75	GBR Peter Boszko	2:15:21
M80	GER Wolf-Dieter Giese	2:33:17
M85	IND Ram Kanwar Sangwan	3:03:21

==== 20 kilometres race walk – teams ====
Category	Zwycięzcy	Result
M35	POL Maher Ben Hlima; POL Krzysztof Czerski; POL Tomasz Lipiec	5:04:59
M40	MEX Etiel Soto Maldonado; MEX José Mariano Herrera Vázquez; MEX David Cristian Berdeja Villavicencio	5:15:21
M45	POL Leszek Behounek; POL Grzegorz Grinholc; POL Konrad Morawczyński	5:39:53
M50	ITA Daniele Carlo Andrea Daclon; ITA Giuseppe Messina; ITA Giuseppe Saponaro	6:10:14
M55	SWE Bengt Bengtsson; SWE Anders Björkman; SWE Ulf-Peter Sjöholm	6:22:08
M60	FRA Patrick Bonvarlet; FRA Patrice Brochot; FRA Marc Haumesser	6:07:11
M65	ITA Edoardo Alfieri; ITA Gabriele Caldarelli; ITA Franco Venturi Degli Esposti	6:14:14
M70	MEX Jose Luis Lopez Camarena; MEX Manuel De Jesus Hernandez Perez; MEX Abel Llamas Zamorano	6:41:20

==== 8 km Cross country running / 6 km Cross country running ====
Categories M35 to M65: 8 km. M70 and over: 6 km.

Category	Winner	Result
M35	SWE David Nilsson	24:54
M40	ESP Pedro Javier Vega Ballesteros	25:44
M45	SWE Adhanom Abraha	25:58
M50	KEN Kenneth Mburu Mung'ara	25:39
M55	GER Miguel Molero-Eichwein	27:12
M60	AUS John Meagher	28:33
M65	USA Daniel King	30:38
M70	BUL Boyan Lefterov	24:07
M75	SWE Bo Persson	26:58
M80	GBR Peter Giles	33:17
M85	GER Fokke Kramer	32:22

==== 8 km Cross country running / 6 km Cross country running – teams ====
Categories M35 to M65: 8 km. M70 and over: 6 km.

Category	Zwycięzcy	Result
M35	ESP Pedro Julián Moreno Alhambra; ESP Mohammed Ben Dohhou Laouini; ESP Cristobal Ortigosa Pareja	1:19:52
M40	GER Marco Benz; GER Andreas Kuhlen; GER Marco Neumann	1:21:47
M45	SWE Adhanom Abraha; SWE Niklas Berglund; SWE Fredrik Uhrbom	1:21:14
M50	ESP Carlos Andrés Lucas Cantero; ESP Víctor Ramón Peña Martínez; ESP Oscar Fernandez Santamaria	1:23:20
M55	ESP Francisco Manuel Mora Arroyo; ESP Ferran De Torres Burgos; ESP Juan Francisco Ruiz Espinosa	1:28:04
M60	GBR Nigel Herron; GBR Ben Reynolds; GBR Chris Upson	1:32:21
M65	USA NDaniel King; USA Roger Sayre; USA David Westenberg	1:33:53
M70	GBR Bob Bradbury; GBR Ronald Cattle; GBR Ian Kitching	1:19:53
M75	USA Girard Learned; USA Gary James Patton; USA Gary Ostwald	1:28:06
M80	GBR Peter Giles; GBR Michael Johnson; GBR Barrie Roberts	1:56:23

==== 10K run ====
Category	Winner	Result
M35	BEL Pieter Berben	31:21
M40	ESP Pedro Javier Vega Ballesteros	31:13
M45	SWE Mustafa Mohamed	30:15
M50	KEN Kenneth Mburu Mung'ara	30:22
M55	GER Miguel Molero-Eichwein	33:10
M60	GBR Andrew Leach	34:58
M65	NED Alex Stienstra	36:13
M70	ESP Rafael Rico	39:43
M75	NED Egbert Zijlstra	42:26
M80	GBR Peter Giles	51:06
M85	GER Fokke Kramer	56:44
M95	ITA Angelo Squadrone	1:49:03

==== Half marathon ====
Category	Winner	Result
M35	SWE David Nilsson	1:06:54
M40	ALG Rafiq Arouaoui	1:09:23
M45	SWE Mustafa Mohamed	1:06:45
M50	DEN Laust Bengtsen	1:13:04
M55	GER Miguel Molero-Eichwein	1:13:53
M60	AUS John Meagher	1:17:51
M65	GBR Paul Mingay	1:22:25
M70	LUX Victor Kiessel	1:26:44
M75	ITA Araldo Viroli	1:32:35
M80	GER Siegfried Kalweit	2:11:54
M85	DEN Jens Myrup Noe	2:31:15

==== Half marathon – teams ====
Category	Zwycięzcy	Result
M35	SWE Per Arvidsson; SWE David Nilsson; SWE Axel Smith	3:30:50
M40	DEN René Quist Agger; DEN Jesper Faurschou; DEN Jonas Ingvardsen	3:39:22
M45	SWE Adhanom Abraha; SWE Markus Bengtsson; SWE Mustafa Mohamed	3:30:13
M50	DEN Laust Bengtsen; DEN Thor Banke Hansen; DEN Henrik Lau	3:54:47
M55	SWE Magnus Åhsberg; SWE Göran Jonsson; SWE Fredrik Tedborn	3:55:29
M60	SWE Thomas Jonsson; SWE Magnus Wennberg; SWE Ulf Yngvesson	4:17:44
M65	UKR Vasyl Lashkul; UKR Vasyl Karpovych; UKR Viktor Nedybaliuk	4:25:31
M70	ESP Pablo Fervenza Entenza; ESP Rafael Rico; ESP Luis Ramón Fernández Suárez	4:44:14
M75	SWE Anders Hansson; SWE Kenth Svensson; SWE Lars Sviden	5:31:55

=== Women ===
==== 100 m ====
Category	Winner	Result
W35	CAN Paula Suchowiecka	11.86
W40	USA Easter Grant	12.19
W45	USA Cynthia McNamee	12.59
W50	AUS Monique Perry	12.90
W55	AUS Julie Brims	12.96
W60	FRA Nicole Alexis	13.68
W65	CAN Wendy Alexis	14.46
W70	CAN Karla Joan Del Grande	14.70
W75	GBR Moira West	16.04
W80	USA Kathy Bergen	17.97
W85	JPN Sumiko Yamakawa Imoto	19.68
W90	USA Betts Stroh	29.87

==== 200 m ====
Category	Winner	Result
W35	CAN Paula Suchowiecka	24.47
W40	USA Easter Grant	24.65
W45	USA Cynthia McNamee	26.08
W50	AUS Janelle Delaney	26.36
W55	AUS Julie Brims	26.89
W60	FRA Nicole Alexis	28.96
W65	USA Elizabeth Deak	30.38
W70	CHI Sara Montecinos	30.79
W75	GBR Moira West	34.23
W80	SWE Barbro Bobäck	36.86
W85	GBR Kathleen Stewart	41.83
W90	ITA Emma Maria Mazzenga	52.08

==== 400 m ====
Category	Winner	Result
W35	GER Sonja Keil	55.49
W40	USA Christina Trucks	56.61
W45	IRL Annette Quaid	58.73
W50	AUS Janelle Delaney	1:00.75
W55	ESP Esther Colás Román	1:02.17
W60	USA Sue McDonald	1:03.77
W65	USA Elizabeth Deak	1:09.98
W70	CHI Sara Montecinos	1:10.62
W75	FRA Michelle Peroni	1:24.45
W80	NED Riet Jonkers-Slegers	1:31.85
W85	GBR Kathleen Stewart	1:39.24
W90	USA Lynne Hurrel	2:26.00

==== 800 m ====
Category	Winner	Result
W35	USA Anna Connor	2:08.32
W40	POL Aneta Lemiesz	2:12.61
W45	FIN Katja Blunden	2:15.78
W50	AUS Evette Cordy	2:25.84
W55	RSA Marili Munnik	2:31.05
W60	USA Sue McDonald	2:25.42
W65	GBR Karen Brooks	2:43.54
W70	GBR Sarah Roberts	2:59.90
W75	USA Jeannie Rice	3:09;52
W80	NED Riet Jonkers-Slegers	3:50.83
W85	PAN Edilia Camargo Villarreal	7:44.41
W90	USA Lynne Hurrell	5:16.16

==== 1500 m ====
Category	Winner	Result
W35	USA Anna Connor	5:02.68
W40	USA Fiona Kehoe	4:38.50
W45	SWE Annika Karolina Faager	4:55.32
W50	BEL Lizzy Immesoete	4:53.84
W55	USA Michelle Rohl	4:55.87
W60	IRL Anne Gilshinan	4:59.45
W65	GBR Karen Brooks	5:35.82
W70	GBR Sarah Roberts	5:59.76
W75	USA Jeannie Rice	6:28.39
W80	DEN Alice Broksø	8:16.52

==== 5000 m ====
Category	Winner	Result
W35	POL Sandra Michalak	17:13.17
W40	GBR Ellie Stevens	16:54.14
W45	KEN Rosaline David	16:56.79
W50	ITA Carla Primo	17:57.44
W55	USA Michelle Rohl	18:30.78
W60	USA Kristine Clark	19:28.50
W65	NOR Synøve Brox	20:17.99
W70	GBR Sarah Roberts	20:58.33
W75	USA Jeannie Rice	22:46.86
W80	FIN Hannele Kivistö	30:57.15
W85	USA Joyce Hodges-Hite	52:34.10

==== 2000 metres steeplechase ====
Category	Winner	Result
W35	NOR Christina Toogood	6:55.26
W40	ESP Vanesa Pacha	7:08.88
W45	POL Danuta Woszczek	7:06.48
W50	ESP Nuria Etxegarai Carbajo	7:34.48
W55	USA Melissa Chiti	8:40.64
W60	ESP Jane Wickham	8:59.75
W65	USA Cheryl Bellaire	9:52.05
W70	AUS Margaret Saunders	10:28.22
W75	AUS Heather Carr	13:30.21
W80	AUS Lynne Schickert	19:11.22

==== 100 metres hurdles / 80 metres hurdles ====
Category W35: 100 m. categories W40 and over: 80 m.

Category	Winner	Result
W35	BRA Wanessa Taciana Zavolski de Melo	15.16
W40	NGR Toyin Augustus	11.83
W45	GER Martina Meissner	12.51
W50	RSA Shona Hutchinson	13.18
W55	USA Andrea Collier	13.37
W60	USA Neringa Jakstiene	12.94
W65	GER Sigrid Böse	14.53
W70	FRA Eliane Piret	17.18
W75	USA Brenda Steele Matthews	28.66
W85	BRA Sumiko Yamakawa Imoto	25.27

==== 400 metres hurdles / 300 metres hurdles / 200 metres hurdles ====
Categories W35 to W45: 400 m. W50–W65: 300 m. W70 and over: 200 m.

Category	Winner	Result
W35	BRA Wanessa Taciana Zavolski de Melo	59.61
W40	SWE Paulina Orell Sahlberg	1:02.19
W45	GRE Anastasia Thomaidou	1:05.05
W50	RSA Shona Hutchinson	45.85
W55	GER Marion Stedefeld	50.36
W60	AUS Sally Stagles	54.18
W65	NOR Anny Undheim	54.39
W70	CAN Karla Joan Del Grande	37.63
W75	GER Gudrun Liedtke	49.84

==== 4 × 100 metres relay ====
Category	Zwycięzcy	Result
W35	FIN Marjukka Tuominen; FIN Ida Hellman; FIN Erika Utriainen; FIN Laura Kolehmainen	49.07
W40	USA Inga McIntyre; USA Christina Trucks; USA Adjua Gibb-Gabriel; USA Easter Grant	48.54
W45	GER Daniela Kliche; GER Dana Prada; GER Dinah Robert; GER Iris Opitz	51.15
W50	AUS Karen Carah; AUS Julie Brims; AUS Lenorë Lambert; AUS Monique Perry	50.98
W55	USA Roxanne Brockner; USA Emmanuelle McGowan; USA Jacqueline Kirk; USA Andrea Collier	53.21
W60	USA Neringa Jakstiene; USA Joy Upshaw; USA Shemayne Williams; USA India Bridgette	55.78
W65	USA Toni Banks; USA Leandra Funk; USA Tomomi Seki; USA Cara Black	1:02.76
W70	GBR Anne Nelson; GBR Caroline Marler; GBR Sue Yeomans; GBR Caroline Powell	1:06.99
W75	FIN Terhi Kokkonen; FIN Marjatta Taipale; FIN Marja Maksimainen; FIN Laura Kolehmainen	1:22.37
W80	USA Louise Guardino; USA Angela Staab; USA Barbara Hensley; USA Cora Hill	1:48.98

==== 4 × 400 metres relay ====
Category	Zwycięzcy	Result
W35	USA Ericka Charles; USA Christina Elder; USA Sophia Downey; USA Odeika Giscombe	3:51.54
W40	USA Maureen Zivic; USA Rachel Anne Guest; USA Adjua Gibb-Gabriel; USA Christina Trucks	3:57.00
W45	ITA Maria De Lourde Quinonez Montano; ITA Silke Breckenfelder; ITA Eliana Marcela Zuniga; ITA Marta Manfrin	4:10.92
W50	AUS Evette Cordy; AUS Julie Brimsr; AUS Lenorë Lambert; AUS Janelle Delaney	4:09.92
W55	GER Anja Schönemann; GER Marion Stedefeld; GER Ulrike Wefers-Fritz; GER Iris Opitz	4:30.25
W60	USA Lorraine Jasper; USA Amanda Margaret Clarke; USA Roxanne Springer; USA Sue McDonald	4:42.06
W65	USA Leandra Funk; USA Lesley Hinz; USA Susan Loyd; USA Elizabeth Deak	5:02.25
W70	GER Ingeborg Thoma; GER Marion Ertl; GER Gudrun Liedtke; GER Margret Goettnauer	6:34.01
W75	USA Sandra Edwards; USA Angela Staab; USA Barbara Hensley; USA Mary Trotto	11:07.31
W80	USA Louise Guardino; USA Cora Hill; USA Willy Moolenaar; USA Mary Smith	8:45.34

==== High jump ====
Category	Winner	Result
W35	FIN Miia Lindholm	1.68
W40	AUT Ekaterina Krasovskiy	1.74
W45	JPN Miyuki Fukumoto	1.65
W50	USA Alison Wood	1.50
W55	GER Iris Heid	1.40
W60	USA Neringa Jakstiene	1.46
W65	IRL Edel Maguire	1.39
W70	GER Ruth Pach	1.16
W75	NED Annelies Steekelenburg	1.09
W80	SWE Barbro Gadle	1.06
W85	USA Christel Donley	0.88

==== Pole vault ====
Category	Winner	Result
W35	GER Eva Mühlhöfer	3.45
W40	GBR Dash Newington	3.40
W45	GBR Jemma Eastwood	3.10
W50	SWE Malin Weiland	3.35
W55	GBR Irie Hill	3.11
W60	ITA Sabina Malandra	2.50
W65	USA Carla Hoppie	2.30
W70	USA Kay Glynn	2.55
W75	USA Mary Trotto	0.95

==== Long jump ====
Category	Winner	Result
W35	SWE Malin Otterling Marmbrandt	6.01
W40	EST Kristi Võhmar	5.33
W45	BUL Magdalena Hristova	5.63
W50	SWE Ulrika Evjen	5.13
W55	SWE Annica Sandström	4.59
W60	USA Neringa Jakstiene	4.74
W65	ESP María Rosa Escribano Checa	4.15
W70	USA Kay Glynn	3.93
W75	SUI Margaritha Dähler-Stettler	3.06
W80	SWE Barbro Gadle	2.82
W85	GER Ingrid Schäfer	1.98
W85	FIN Senni Sopanen	0.89

==== Triple jump ====
Category	Winner	Result
W35	SWE Malin Marmbrandt	12.85
W40	GER Aurica Gründer	11.62
W45	GER Sandra Kramer	12.05
W50	HUN Andrea Szirbucz	11.10
W55	TUR Hülya Figen Karadağ	10.01
W60	USA Neringa Jakstiene	9.99
W65	ESP María Rosa Escribano Checa	9.03
W70	NOR Marit Huflåtten	7.80
W75	FIN Terhi Kokkonen	6.34
W80	GBR Iris Holder	5.82
W85	USA Christel Donley	4.10

==== Shot put ====
Categories W35 to W45: 4 kg. W50–W70: 3 kg. W75 and over: 2 kg.

Category	Winner	Result
W35	GER Jenny Hase	12.49
W40	DEN Maria Sløk Hansen	14.76
W45	UKR Tetiana Nasonova	13.60
W50	GBR Paula Williams	13.96
W55	GER Jana Müller-Schmidt	13.55
W60	CHN Zhang Hong	13.28
W65	COL Yaneth Tenorio	10.78
W70	GER Brigitte Bonadt	10.52
W75	HUN Mária Terézia Gosztolai	9.65
W80	AUT Marianne Maier	10.60
W85	GBR Evaun Williams	9.42
W90	SWE Gerd Magnusson	4.73

==== Discus throw ====
Categories W35 to W70: 1 kg. W75 and over: 0.75 kg.

Category	Winner	Result
W35	AUT Veronika Watzek	48.38
W40	FIN Tanja Komulainen	46.78
W45	NOR Else Lundestad Bakkelid	46.36
W50	GER Bettina Schardt	43.06
W55	UKR Svitlana Sorochuk	38.37
W60	LTU Janina Lapieniene	37.64
W65	USA Carol Elinor Finsrud	33.30
W70	ESP Mercedes Ribelles	25.99
W75	HUN Mária Terézia Gosztolai	27.31
W80	LAT Maija Jakobsone	23.35
W85	GBR Evaun Williams	22.42
W90	SWE Art Lindh	7.71

==== Hammer throw ====
Categories W35 to W45: 4 kg. W50–W70: 3 kg. W75 and over: 2 kg.

Category	Winner	Result
W35	SWE Tracey Andersson	60.75
W40	USA Amy Haapanen	55.18
W45	FRA Séverine Bourgogne	45.19
W50	UKR Nataliia Radionova	48.87
W55	FRA Jenny Meyer Klein	49.09
W60	USA Bonnie Edmondson	41.73
W65	GER Elke Herzig	34.96
W70	AUT Sabina Plammer	31.00
W75	GER Eva Nohl	38.99
W80	AUS Mary Thomas	29.47
W85	GBR Evaun Williams	31.04

==== Weight throw ====
Categories W35 to W45: 9.08 kg. W50–W55: 7.25 kg. W60–W70: 5.45 kg. W75 and over: 4 kg.

Category	Winner	Result
W35	RSA Ursula Killian	15.72
W40	GBR Lucy Marshall	17.06
W45	GBR Andrea Jenkins	14.00
W50	UKR Nataliia Radionova	16.49
W55	NED Gonny Mik	15.61
W60	GER Margret Klein-Raber	17.13
W65	GER Elke Herzig	14.03
W70	LTU Genovaite Kazlauskiene	13.60
W75	USA Myrle Mensey	15.84
W80	FIN Kirsti Viitanen	12.60
W85	GBR Evaun Williams	11.97

==== Javelin throw ====
Categories W35 to W45: 600 g. W50–W70: 500 g. W75 and over: 400 g.

Category	Winner	Result
W35	GBR Laurensa Britane	43.24
W40	HUN Tímea Zsuzsanna Grábner	41.18
W45	UKR TLiliia Apolosova	42.03
W50	HUN Agnes Preisinger	44.05
W55	USA Durelle Koren Schimek	36.49
W60	POL Genowefa Patla	36.61
W65	CAN Barbara Dabrowski	29.27
W70	CZE Vanda Srbová	32.73
W75	GER Eva Nohl	20.74
W80	SUI Adelheid Graber-Bolliger	20.07
W85	GBR Evaun Williams	24.78
W90	SWE Art Lindh	4.99

==== Throws pentathlon ====
Category	Winner	Result
W35	RSA Ursula Killian	3342
W40	FIN Tanja Komulainen	3545
W45	CAN Mélanie Guy	3472
W50	GER Dagmar Suhling	3573
W55	FRA Jenny Meyer Klein	3638
W60	TTO Gwendolyn Smith	3745
W65	FIN Liisa Mäkitörmä	3636
W70	DEN Anne Kirstine Jensen	3849
W75	USA Myrle Mensey	4079
W80	FIN Kirsti Viitanen	4062
W85	GBR Evaun Williams	5117

==== Heptathlon ====
Category	Winner	Result
W35	ROU Beatrice Puiu	5293
W40	NOR Lene Berger	4749
W45	UKR Kseniia Yatsenko	5083
W50	GER Tatjana Schilling	5703
W55	AUS Karen Carah	5550
W60	USA Neringa Jakstiene	5703
W65	ESP María Rosa Escribano Checa	5502
W70	GER Ruth Pach	4632
W75	GER Gudrun Liedtke	3441
W80	NED Riet Jonkers-Slegers	3892
W85	USA Christel Donley	1647

==== 5000 metres race walk ====
Category	Winner	Result
W35	LAT Modra Liepina	26:09.92
W40	FRA Vanessa Denisselle	23:55.63
W45	ESP Maria Jose Poves Novella	24:51.42
W50	FRA Gwladys Brusseau	27:33.68
W55	USA Michelle Rohl	25:25.50
W60	CAN Line Falcon	30:04.32
W65	FRA Marie Astrid Monmessin	29:36.48
W70	POR Maria Mendes	30:38.49
W75	RSA Elsa Meyer	32:58.67
W80	RSA Anne Centner	34:34.50

==== 10 kilometres race walk ====
Category	Winner	Result
W35	LAT Modra Liepina	53:31
W40	FRA Vanessa Denisselle	49:26
W45	SWE Monica Svensson	50:35
W50	ITA Valeria Pedetti	51:52
W55	USA Michelle Rohl	50:54
W60	CAN Line Falcon	1:02:26
W65	FRA Marie Astrid Monmessin	1:01:07
W70	POR Maria Mendes	1:04:49
W75	RSA Elsa Meyer	1:08:57
W80	RSA Anne Centner	1:11:55

==== 10 kilometres race walk – teams ====
Category	Zwycięzcy	Result
W35	AUT Barbara Hollinger; AUT Kathrin Schulze; AUT Ulrike Striednig	3:00:30
W40	FRA Hélène Cottreau; FRA Vanessa Denisselle; FRA Elodie Varoquier	2:44:34
W45	ESP María Azucena García; ESP Maria Jose Poves Novella; ESP Elenir Oliveira dos Santos	3:01:09
W50	ITA Elena Cinca; ITA Valeria Pedetti; ITA Paola Zuccari	2:49:17
W55	FRA Valérie Boban; FRA Catherine Florentin; FRA Laurence Sina	2:57:57
W60	MEX Yolanda Esparza Cornejo; MEX Maria del Rosario Cervantes Mendez; MEX Maria Engracia Calleros Ramos	3:24:04
W65	CAN Nicole Bégin; CAN Sylvie Fortin; CAN Nancy Patten	3:20:51
W70	CAN Teresa Betzabe Chiozza; CAN Kris Kozell; CAN Anne de Thy	3:25:20
W75	GER Helga Dräger; GER Renate Köhler; GER Heidrun Neidel	4:16:38

==== 20 kilometres race walk ====
Category	Winner	Result
W35	AUS Melissa Lewis	2:00:07
W40	FRA Vanessa Denisselle	1:46:59
W45	SWE Monica Svensson	1:46:59
W50	FRA Sandra Jean	2:05:48
W55	FRA Valérie Boban	1:56:53
W60	GBR Marie Jackson	2:08:53
W65	USA Liz Dufour	2:20:44
W70	POR Maria Mendes	2:16:51
W75	RSA Elsa Meyer	2:22:06

==== 20 kilometres race walk – teams ====
Category	Zwycięzcy	Result
W35	GBR Marie Jackson; GBR Aleksandra Majewska-Ani; GBR Melanie Peddle	6:22:59
W40	FRA Vanessa Denisselle; FRA Sandra Jean; FRA Elodie Varoquier	5:50:26
W45	GER Gudrun Klose; GER Monika Mueller; GER Bianca Schenker	6:50:03
W50	RSA Edna Brand; RSA Bronwyn Dawn Roussot; RSA Elsa Meyer	6:54:18
W55	FRA Valérie Boban; FRA Catherine Florentin; FRA Laurence Sina	6:08:23
W60	HKG Suk Lan Lam; HKG Wai Ha Suen; HKG Sau King Irene Tai	7:16:46

==== 8 km Cross country running / 6 km Cross country running ====
Categories M35 to M65: 8 km. M70 and over: 6 km.

Category	Winner	Result
W35	SWE Liduina van Sitteren	30:00
W40	USA Melissa Dock	29:29
W45	IRL Michelle Kenny	30:28
W50	ITA Carla Primo	30:37
W55	NED Agnes Schipper	32:13
W60	USA Kristine Clark	33:59
W65	GBR Jenny Reay	35:44
W70	AUS Rosemary Roediger	27:52
W75	USA Jeannie Rice	29:29
W80	FIN Hannele Kivistö	39:35

==== 8 km Cross country running / 6 km Cross country running – teams ====
Categories M35 to M65: 8 km. M70 and over: 6 km.

Category	Zwycięzcy	Result
W35	SWE Anna Franklin; SWE Evelina de la Motte; SWE Liduina van Sitteren	1:36:58
W40	IRL Karla Doran; IRL Fiona Gettings; IRL Rachel Murphy	1:36:04
W45	ESP Sara Beltran Bascon; ESP Ana Belén Bernalte Incertis; ESP María José De Toro Saiz	1:40:09
W50	USA Hortencia Aliaga; USA Rebekah Kennedy; USA Euleen Josiah-Tanner	1:38:07
W55	SWE Helen Eriksson; SWE Petra Klevmar; SWE Katarina Löf Hagström	1:45:39
W60	SWE Camilla Rosén Cedervärn; SWE Carina Rosén Eriksson; SWE Marie Olsson	1:45:23
W65	ESP Manuela Martinez Gonzalez; ESP Angeles Rodríguez Del Río; ESP Dorotea Sevilla Santamaría	2:05:06
W70	AUS Elizabeth Lowther; AUS Rosemary Roediger; AUS Julie Wilson	1:32:44
W75	GBR Anne Dockery; GBR Carolyn Gale; GBR Ros Tabor	1:39:39

==== 10K run ====
Category	Winner	Result
W35	POR Andreia Filipa Santos	35:37
W40	GBR Ellie Stevens	35:09
W45	KEN Rosaline David	35:08
W50	ITA Carla Primo	36:58
W55	IRL Annette Kealy	39:30
W60	AUT Sabine Hofer	40:58
W65	NOR Synøve Brox	41:49
W70	DEN Vibeke Hansen	46:36
W75	USA Jeannie Rice	47:30
W80	POL Barbara Prymakowska	1:01:55

==== Half marathon ====
Category	Winner	Result
W35	SWE Liduina van Sitteren	1:20:19
W40	GBR Ellie Stevens	1:18:23
W45	SWE Erica Lech	1:20:56
W50	ITA Catherine Bertone	1:20:25
W55	GBR Lisa Finlay	1:26:00
W60	DEN Tove Schultz-Lorentzen	1:33:45
W65	CAN Elizabeth Alexandra Waywell	1:33:58
W70	DEN Vibeke Hansen	1:40:54
W75	USA Jeannie Rice	1:40:58
W80	FIN Hannele Kivistö	2:18:20

==== Half marathon – teams ====
Category	Zwycięzcy	Result
W35	SWE Anna Bjurman; SWE Linda Gistedt; SWE Liduina van Sitteren	4:02:20
W40	GBR Catherine Charlton; GBR Stephanie Fauset; GBR Ellie Stevens	4:24:50
W45	SWE Caroline Lidebjer; SWE Erica Lech; SWE Annika Wellner	4:27:55
W50	USA Euleen Josiah-Tanner; USA Rebekah Kennedy; USA Jennifer Malavolta	4:31:50
W55	IRL Irene Clements; IRL Donna Evans; IRL Annette Kealy	4:36:21
W60	GBR Tracey Gibson; GBR Jenny Reay; GBR Fiona Usher	4:59:02
W65	FIN Marjatta Räsänen; FIN Riitta Ristikangas; FIN Aila Siltala	6:04:33
W70	GBR Carolyn Gale; GBR Barbara Ockendon; GBR Jane Wall	6:04:33
W75	GER Brigitta Biermanski; GER Maria Brigitte Nittel; GER Gudrun Vogl	6:59:19

== Medal table ==
* Host nation (Sweden)

Rank	Nation	Gold	Silver	Bronze	Total
1	United States	110	73	63	246
2	Germany	79	66	58	203
3	Great Britain	70	60	57	187
4	Sweden*	60	46	68	174
5	Spain	33	37	33	103
6	France	29	29	31	89
7	Finland	28	37	24	89
8	Poland	28	16	25	69
9	Australia	24	32	17	73
10	Canada	22	19	18	59
11	Italy	20	36	25	81
12	Norway	14	19	27	60
13	Netherlands	14	12	18	44
14	South Africa	13	7	7	27
15	Ireland	12	13	10	35
16	Denmark	12	12	15	39
17	Austria	11	12	9	32
18	Czech Republic	11	3	3	17
19	Ukraine	8	5	6	19
20	Greece	8	5	3	16
21	Kenya	7	10	9	26
22	Mexico	7	9	4	20
23	Saudi Arabia	7	4	3	14
24	Japan	6	10	13	29
25	India	6	6	5	17
26	Mongolia	6	0	5	11
27	Latvia	5	8	9	22
28	Portugal	5	5	2	12
29	Hungary	5	4	2	11
30	Brazil	4	7	7	18
31	Estonia	4	6	3	13
32	Belgium	3	8	6	17
33	Lithuania	3	4	3	10
34	Switzerland	2	6	1	9
35	Romania	2	5	3	10
36	Bulgaria	2	3	1	6
37	Chile	2	2	2	6
38	Hong Kong	2	1	8	11
39	Argentina	2	1	3	6
40	Luxembourg	2	1	1	4
41	Slovenia	2	0	1	3
42	Albania	2	0	0	2
43	Colombia	1	2	4	7
43	Trinidad and Tobago	1	2	4	7
45	Cuba	1	1	1	3
46	Turkey	1	1	0	2
47	New Zealand	1	0	4	5
48	Puerto Rico	1	0	3	4
49	Bahamas	1	0	1	2
49	China	1	0	1	2
51	Algeria	1	0	0	1
51	Kuwait	1	0	0	1
51	Nigeria	1	0	0	1
51	Panama	1	0	0	1
55	Uruguay	0	2	2	4
56	Mauritius	0	2	0	2
56	Philippines	0	2	0	2
58	Malta	0	1	2	3
59	Cyprus	0	1	1	2
60	Ecuador	0	1	0	1
60	Jamaica	0	1	0	1
60	Senegal	0	1	0	1
60	Sri Lanka	0	1	0	1
60	Tunisia	0	1	0	1
60	Venezuela	0	1	0	1
66	Slovakia	0	0	4	4
67	Iran	0	0	2	2
68	Armenia	0	0	1	1
68	Egypt	0	0	1	1
68	Malaysia	0	0	1	1
Totals (70 entries)		704	659	640	2,003
