= 2025 European Masters Athletics Championships =

European Masters Athletics Championships 2025
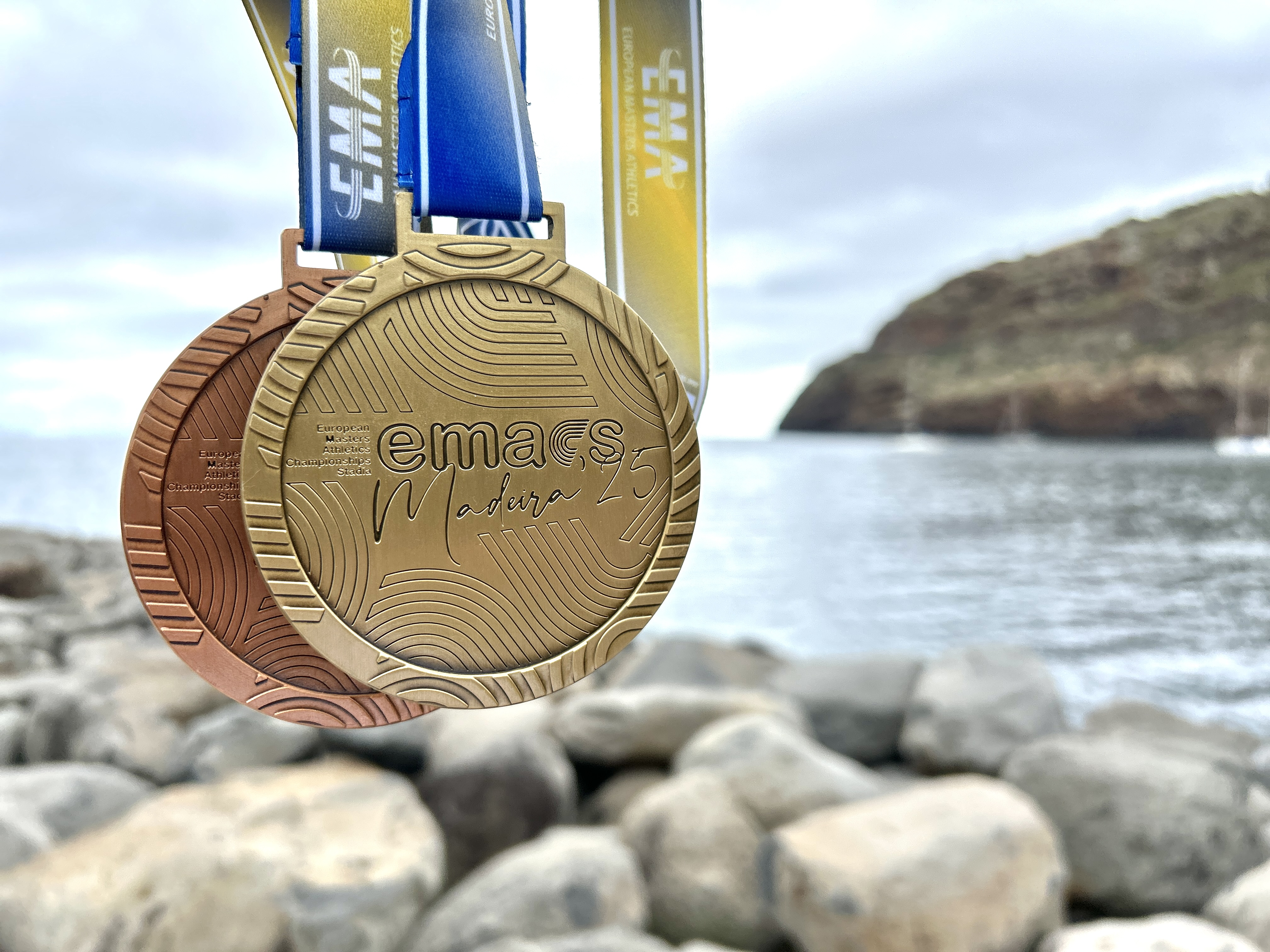
- Organisers: European Masters Athletics
- Edition: 23rd
- Dates: 9–19 October
- Host city: Madeira
- Level: Masters
- Type: Outdoor
- Events: 69
- Participation: 4192 athletes from 40 nations
- Official website: https://www.emacs-madeira2025.com/

The European Masters Athletics Championships 2025 (European Masters Athletics Championships – Stadia) were the 23rd edition of the European Masters Athletics Championships and were held on the island of Madeira, Portugal, from 9 to 19 October 2025.

Venues used in championships: Centro Desportivo da Madeira, RG3, Câmara de Lobos, Chão das Feiteiras. Competitions also took pleace on streets of Funchal (10K run, half marathon) and Machico (10 kilometres race walk, 20 kilometres race walk). There was a total of 4192 from 40 countries competing. 69 events were held, 34 for woman, 34 for men and 1 mixed. Great Britain headed the medal table on 129 gold medals.

== Medals table ==
* Host nation (Portugal)

| Rank | Nation | Gold | Silver | Bronze | Total |
|---|---|---|---|---|---|
| 1 | Great Britain (GBR) | 129 | 101 | 76 | 306 |
| 2 | Germany (GER) | 109 | 98 | 81 | 288 |
| 3 | France (FRA) | 65 | 59 | 65 | 189 |
| 4 | Spain (ESP) | 58 | 63 | 65 | 186 |
| 5 | Italy (ITA) | 51 | 45 | 36 | 132 |
| 6 | Sweden (SWE) | 45 | 30 | 24 | 99 |
| 7 | Poland (POL) | 37 | 39 | 41 | 117 |
| 8 | Ireland (IRL) | 32 | 28 | 20 | 80 |
| 9 | Portugal (POR)* | 30 | 33 | 26 | 89 |
| 10 | Finland (FIN) | 24 | 37 | 33 | 94 |
| 11 | Netherlands (NED) | 24 | 17 | 27 | 68 |
| 12 | Norway (NOR) | 15 | 16 | 16 | 47 |
| 13 | Austria (AUT) | 14 | 15 | 16 | 45 |
| 14 | Ukraine (UKR) | 11 | 10 | 8 | 29 |
| 15 | Hungary (HUN) | 11 | 4 | 2 | 17 |
| 16 | Belgium (BEL) | 10 | 13 | 15 | 38 |
| 17 | Estonia (EST) | 9 | 8 | 7 | 24 |
| 18 | Czech Republic (CZE) | 8 | 9 | 13 | 30 |
| 19 | Switzerland (SUI) | 7 | 8 | 6 | 21 |
| 20 | Luxembourg (LUX) | 7 | 0 | 2 | 9 |
| 21 | Latvia (LAT) | 6 | 18 | 9 | 33 |
| 22 | Denmark (DEN) | 6 | 13 | 15 | 34 |
| 23 | Lithuania (LTU) | 5 | 3 | 7 | 15 |
| 24 | Greece (GRE) | 4 | 9 | 1 | 14 |
| 25 | Romania (ROU) | 4 | 5 | 7 | 16 |
| 26 | Israel (ISR) | 3 | 2 | 0 | 5 |
| 27 | Bulgaria (BUL) | 3 | 1 | 2 | 6 |
| 28 | Slovakia (SVK) | 2 | 4 | 5 | 11 |
| 29 | Iceland (ISL) | 1 | 2 | 5 | 8 |
| 29 | Slovenia (SLO) | 1 | 2 | 5 | 8 |
| 31 | Croatia (CRO) | 1 | 0 | 0 | 1 |
| 32 | Malta (MLT) | 0 | 1 | 1 | 2 |
| 33 | Serbia (SRB) | 0 | 0 | 1 | 1 |
| 33 | Turkey (TUR) | 0 | 0 | 1 | 1 |
| Totals (34 entries) | | 732 | 693 | 638 | 2,063 |

== European champions ==
According to sources

=== Men ===
==== 100 m ====
| Category | Winner | Result |
| M35 | ITA Mario Brigida | 10.92 |
| M40 | GRE Alexandros Kokkinis | 11.37 |
| M45 | SWE Lion Martínez | 10.96 |
| M50 | GBR TJ Ossai | 11.42 |
| M55 | GBR Darren Scott | 11.96 |
| M60 | GER Roland Gröger | 12.38 |
| M65 | GBR B John Wright | 12.26 |
| M70 | GBR Steve Peters | 13.29 |
| M75 | ITA Antonio Rossi | 14.16 |
| M80 | GER Friedhelm Adorf | 15.01 |
| M85 | EST Juhan Tennaslim | 17.56 |
| M90 | GER Siegfried Richter | 20.12 |

==== 200 m ====
| Category | Winner | Result |
| M35 | ITA Bokar Badji | 22.23 |
| M40 | GRE Alexandros Kokkinis | 22.56 |
| M45 | GBR Gavin Stephens | 23.06 |
| M50 | ESP José Pascual Martínez Albert | 23.33 |
| M55 | GBR Darren Scott | 23.88 |
| M60 | GER Roland Gröger | 24.88 |
| M65 | GBR B John Wright | 24.68 |
| M70 | GBR Steve Peters | 25.97 |
| M75 | POL Juliusz Kuschill | 30.98 |
| M80 | GER Friedhelm Adorf | 30.15 |
| M85 | FRA Jean-Louis Esnault | 35.60 |
| M90 | GER Siegfried Richter | 45.15 |

==== 400 m ====
| Category | Winner | Result |
| M35 | ISR Dor Kollwitz | 48.37 |
| M40 | GRE Alexandros Kokkinis | 49.26 |
| M45 | GBR Gavin Stephens | 50.89 |
| M50 | ITA Ivan Mancinelli | 51.59 |
| M55 | ESP Juan Luis López Anaya | 52.59 |
| M60 | GER Roland Gröger | 54.61 |
| M65 | GBR B John Wright | 56.36 |
| M70 | GBR Steve Peters | 1:01.62 |
| M75 | FIN Tarmo Tupala | 1:07.14 |
| M80 | GER Friedhelm Adorf | 1:15.41 |
| M85 | FRA Jean-Louis Esnault | 1:18.28 |
| M90 | GBR Colin Spivey | 1:46.77 |

==== 800 m ====
| Category | Winner | Result |
| M35 | FRA Mehdi Naciri | 1:57.14 |
| M40 | GER Sebastian Schiefer | 1:54.23 |
| M45 | GBR Paul Grange | 1:56.67 |
| M50 | GBR Charlie Thurstan | 2:00.93 |
| M55 | NED Andrew Larasen | 2:02.53 |
| M60 | GBR Robert McHarg | 2:07.65 |
| M65 | ISL Hafsteinn Óskarsson | 2:22.50 |
| M70 | IRL Joe Gough | 2:29.39 |
| M75 | NED Hans Smeets | 2:52.85 |
| M80 | IRL John Mac Dermott | 3:04.80 |
| M85 | FRA Jean-Louis Esnault | 3:01.44 |
| M90 | GBR Colin Spivey | 4:17.60 |

==== 1500 m ====
| Category | Winner | Result |
| M35 | FRA Guillaume Lorton | 3:53.87 |
| M40 | GBR Chris Loudon | 4:01.67 |
| M45 | GBR Paul Grange | 4:06.62 |
| M50 | GBR Dean Richardson | 4:07.51 |
| M55 | NED Andrew Larasen | 4:14.80 |
| M60 | GBR Andrew Ridley | 4:35.75 |
| M65 | GBR Jed Turner | 4:56.78 |
| M70 | LAT Peteris Arents | 5:22.15 |
| M75 | NED Hans Smeets | 5:51.83 |
| M80 | NED Wim Oudejans | 6:19.43 |
| M85 | FRA Jean-Louis Esnault | 6:48.18 |
| M90 | GBR Colin Spivey | 8:50.36 |

==== 5000 m ====
| Category | Winner | Result |
| M35 | FRA Guillaume Lorton | 15:01.00 |
| M40 | ESP Saul Castro Santana | 15:02.42 |
| M45 | POR Jorge Varela | 15:49.43 |
| M50 | ESP Víctor Ramon Peña Martinez | 16:02.56 |
| M55 | ESP Miguel Angel Balague Rubio | 17:04.52 |
| M60 | GBR Chris Upson | 17:26.83 |
| M65 | GBR Paul Mingay | 18:13.35 |
| M70 | LUX Victor Kiessel | 19:12.17 |
| M75 | ESP Celso Curiel | 22:18.61 |
| M80 | NED Wim Oudejans | 24:12.07 |
| M85 | FRA Jean-Louis Esnault | 27:05.36 |
| M90 | GBR Colin Spivey | 32:11.27 |
| M95 | ITA Angelo Squadrone | 55:55.85 |

==== 10000 m ====
| Category | Winner | Result |
| M35 | POR Lopes Nuno | 32:44.11 |
| M40 | GER Michael Lang | 33:51.99 |
| M45 | ITA Gabriele Frescucci | 34:24.00 |
| M50 | ESP Manuel Carlos Outón Besada | 34:05.84 |
| M55 | NED Peter van der Velden | 35:50.78 |
| M60 | GBR Chris Upson | 37:05.86 |
| M65 | FRA Gilles Herman | 39:20.28 |
| M70 | LUX Victor Kiessel | 40:44.96 |
| M75 | FRA Jean Thomas | 48:22.79 |
| M80 | NED Wim Oudejans | 50:13.63 |
| M85 | FRA Jean-Louis Esnault | 54:34.77 |

==== 3000 metres steeplechase / 2000 metres steeplechase ====
Categories M35 to M55: 3000 m, M60 and over: 2000 m.

| Category | Winner | Result |
| M35 | FRA Antoine Rollet | 9:14.55 |
| M40 | ESP Diego De La Fuente Ibañez | 9:49.28 |
| M45 | GER David Kiefer | 9:45.23 |
| M50 | FRA Jerome Chiquet | 10:06.77 |
| M55 | FRA Pascal Ruiz | 10:35.56 |
| M60 | NED Peter Mijsberg | 7:15.01 |
| M65 | NED Theo Woldberg | 7:59.99 |
| M70 | UKR Oleksandr Lysenko | 8:58.65 |
| M75 | POL Marian Leśniak | 10:51.67 |
| M80 | FRA Roger Godard | 10:36.12 |

==== 110 metres hurdles / 100 metres hurdles / 80 metres hurdles ====
Categories M35 to M45: 110 m, M50–M65: 100 m, M70 and over: 80 m.

| Category | Winner | Result |
| M35 | ESP Victor Orduna | 14.89 |
| M40 | GBR Michael Louise | 15.42 |
| M45 | GBR Mensah Elliott | 14.97 |
| M50 | GBR Joe Appiah | 13.96 |
| M55 | SWE Christian Josefsson | 16.21 |
| M60 | NED Wan Bakx | 14.91 |
| M65 | POL Wiesław Musiał | 16.28 |
| M70 | SUI Erwin Meier | 13.56 |
| M75 | POL Juliusz Kuschill | 14.12 |
| M80 | SVK Milan Beliansky | 17.32 |
| M85 | NOR Knut Henrik Skramstad | 23.47 |

==== 400 metres hurdles / 300 metres hurdles / 200 metres hurdles ====
Categories M35 to M55: 400 m, M60–M65: 300 m, M70 and over: 200 m.

| Category | Winner | Result |
| M35 | GBR Damaine Benjamin | 54.14 |
| M40 | GBR Stefan Wilcockson | 58.02 |
| M45 | POL Jakub Adamczyk | 58.34 |
| M50 | ITA Paolo Citterio | 1:00.28 |
| M55 | NED Toine van Beckhoven | 1:01.48 |
| M60 | ITA Antonio D'Errico | 44.38 |
| M65 | LTU Vytautas Zaniauskas | 46.55 |
| M70 | FRA Louis Clautour | 50.89 |
| M75 | POL Juliusz Kuschill | 56.11 |
| M80 | FRA Francois Poncin | 41.69 |
| M85 | FRA Jean-Louis Esnault | 43.93 |

==== 4 × 100 metres relay ====
| Category | Winners | Result |
| M35 | GBR Byron Robinson; GBR Damaine Benjamin; GBR Duayne Bovell; GBR Nicholas Atwell | 43.17 |
| M40 | POL Daniel Kossowski; POL Łukasz Pawłowski; POL Piotr Kucharski; POL Szymon Ogonowski | 45.26 |
| M45 | GBR Alan Robertson; GBR Marvin Edwards; GBR Mensah Elliott; GBR Oliver Pool | 44.32 |
| M50 | ITA Alessandro Lassi; ITA Andrea Portalatini; ITA Claudio Fausti; ITA Francesco Di Leonardo | 44.64 |
| M55 | FRA Etienne Martinet; FRA Georges Egoua; FRA Karim Kourtaa; FRA Patrick Guichard | 48.88 |
| M60 | GER Andreas Groneberg; GER Carsten Schuh; GER Gerald Braun; GER Roland Gröger | 48.35 |
| M65 | GBR Andy Hunter; GBR B John Wright; GBR Pat Logan; GBR Ricardo Huskisson | 49.22 |
| M70 | GBR Adrian Essex; GBR Robert Stevenson; GBR Steve Peters; GBR Wally Franklyn | 54.36 |
| M75 | GER Friedhelm Adorf; GER Jürgen Freymuth; GER Ulrich Becker; GER Zygmunt Bogdan | 57.85 |
| M80 | GBR Alan Forse; GBR James Smith; GBR Mel James; GBR Victor Novell | 1:04.17 |

==== 4 × 400 metres relay ====
| Category | Winners | Result |
| M35 | BEL Dries Sedeyn; BEL Jori Stroobants; BEL Lucion Alexandre; BEL Wim Raes | 3:22.35 |
| M40 | POL Bartosz Porzuczek; POL Jakub Adamczyk; POL Karol Górny; POL Szymon Ogonowski | 3:24.93 |
| M45 | ESP Ángel Luis Sanz Cerezo; ESP David Bueno Monge; ESP Oscar Iranzo Jaime; ESP Sergio Morales Valades | 3:33.65 |
| M50 | FRA Christian Verdier; FRA Joël Gomez; FRA Marc Ozier; FRA Mickael Rince | 3:33.97 |
| M55 | NED Andrew Larasen; NED Marc van Gils; NED Sjef Aertse; NED Toine van Beckhoven | 3:41.62 |
| M60 | GBR Adrian James; GBR Roy Head; GBR Vincent Elie; GBR Wole Odele | 3:52.66 |
| M65 | GBR B John Wright; GBR Richard White; GBR Stuart Lynn; GBR Tennyson James | 4:03.35 |
| M70 | GER Friedhelm Adorf; GER Kurt Fischer; GER Rudolf König; GER Wolfgang Kreemke | 4:33.00 |
| M75 | GER Hans Kuhn; GER Jürgen Freymuth; GER Ulrich Becker; GER Zygmunt Bogdan | 5:04.40 |
| M80 | FIN Jouko Ylä-Liedenpohja; FIN Kunto Viiru; FIN Markku Juopperi; FIN Timo Suvanto | 7:11.54 |

==== High jump ====
| Category | Winner | Result |
| M35 | FRA Michael Salomon | 2.00 |
| M40 | NOR Vadim Pecherskii | 1.91 |
| M45 | FRA Bernard Prevel | 1.90 |
| M50 | FRA Nils Portemer | 1.93 |
| M55 | BUL Konstantin Kirov | 1.73 |
| M60 | GER Wilhelm Martin | 1.60 |
| M65 | ITA Fabrizio Finetti | 1.55 |
| M70 | UKR Oleg Fedorko | 1.55 |
| M75 | FIN Jarmo Lipasti | 1.40 |
| M80 | EST Jürgen Lamp | 1.23 |
| M85 | EST Juhan Tennasilm | 1.20 |
| M90 | SLO Marko Sluga | 1.00 |

==== Pole vault ====
| Category | Winner | Result |
| M35 | NED Marco De Keijzer | 4.10 |
| M40 | FRA Fabien Plaisant | 4.40 |
| M45 | GER Dr. Thomas Ritte | 4.25 |
| M50 | SWE Jonas Asplund | 4.10 |
| M55 | ITA Massimiliano Ruggio | 3.95 |
| M60 | ESP Francisco Javier Hernández Rivero | 3.60 |
| M65 | SVK Miroslav Bajner | 3.50 |
| M70 | GER Wolfgang Ritte | 3.20 |
| M75 | LAT Valdis Cela | 2.90 |
| M80 | SWE Sune Persson | 2.30 |
| M85 | EST Juhan Tennasilm | 2.10 |

==== Long jump ====
| Category | Winner | Result |
| M35 | CZE Michal Borek | 6.69 |
| M40 | UKR Orest Bulak | 6.48 |
| M45 | GBR Neil Barton | 6.31 |
| M50 | GBR Joe Appiah | 6.14 |
| M55 | POL Marek Wideł | 5.76 |
| M60 | ITA Gianni Becatti | 5.91 |
| M65 | FRA Patrick Barbier | 5.29 |
| M70 | GBR Robert Stevenson | 4.87 |
| M75 | SWE Olle Borg | 4.61 |
| M80 | POL Ziggy Pakiet | 3.80 |
| M85 | EST Juhan Tennasilm | 3.58 |
| M90 | GER Siegfried Richter | 2.73 |

==== Triple jump ====
| Category | Winner | Result |
| M35 | ESP José Alfonso Palomanes Martínez | 14.35 |
| M40 | UKR Orest Bulak | 13.56 |
| M45 | FRA Najib Bannour | 13.44 |
| M50 | CZE Marek Volf | 13.14 |
| M55 | ESP Mario Quintero Estrada | 12.67 |
| M60 | NOR Oddvar Viulsrød | 11.54 |
| M65 | POL Wiesław Musiał | 10.74 |
| M70 | NOR Arne Tefre | 10.77 |
| M75 | ITA Giuliano Costantini | 9.81 |
| M80 | EST Jürgen Lamp | 7.88 |
| M85 | EST Juhan Tennasilm | 7.12 |

==== Shot put ====
Categories M35 to M45: 7.26 kg, M50–M55: 6 kg, M60–M65: 5 kg, M70–M75: 4 kg, M80 and over: 3 kg.

| Category | Winner | Result |
| M35 | FIN Jussi Tukeva | 15.00 |
| M40 | POL Rafał Kownatke | 16.49 |
| M45 | BUL Galin Kostadinov | 14.53 |
| M50 | GER Andy Dittmar | 17.55 |
| M55 | CZE Pavel Penaz | 15.24 |
| M60 | GER Norbert Demmel | 14.98 |
| M65 | GBR Allan Leiper | 13.44 |
| M70 | GER Roland Wattenbach | 13.40 |
| M75 | NOR Arild Busterud | 12.47 |
| M80 | GER Franz Didio | 11.33 |
| M85 | GER Roland Heiler | 10.87 |
| M90 | SWE Östen Edlund | 10.09 |
| M95 | ESP Joesp Maria Ribera Banzo | 4.82 |

==== Discus throw ====
Categories M35 to M45: 2 kg, M50–M55: 1.5 kg, M60 over: 1 kg.

| Category | Winner | Result |
| M35 | ISR Denis Valiulin | 52.10 |
| M40 | POR Filipe Silva | 52.19 |
| M45 | ITA Emanuele Venturelli | 44.73 |
| M50 | GER Ralf Mordhorst | 54.93 |
| M55 | GER Paul Emck | 42.77 |
| M60 | GER Norbert Demmel | 53.48 |
| M65 | GBR John Moreland | 47.29 |
| M70 | GBR Guy Dirkin | 43.40 |
| M75 | NOR Arild Busterud | 39.47 |
| M80 | GER Franz Didio | 29.19 |
| M85 | GER Roland Heiler | 33.15 |
| M90 | SWE Östen Edlund | 28.08 |
| M95 | ESP Joesp Maria Ribera Banzo | 11.80 |

==== Hammer throw ====
Categories M35 to M45: 7.26 kg, M50–M55: 6 kg, M60–M65: 5 kg, M70–M75: 4 kg, M80 and over: 3 kg.

| Category | Winner | Result |
| M35 | POR João Venade | 57.34 |
| M40 | GER Andreas Sahner | 65.22 |
| M45 | FIN Markus Granö | 50.33 |
| M50 | POL Mariusz Walczak | 63.02 |
| M55 | HUN Zoltán Fábián | 63.50 |
| M60 | HUN Balázs Lezsák | 62.51 |
| M65 | AUT Gottfried Gassenbauer | 48.28 |
| M70 | POL Wacław Krankowski | 44.80 |
| M75 | NOR Arild Busterud | 51.74 |
| M80 | AUT Heimo Viertbauer | 50.57 |
| M85 | FRA Gilbert Storq | 34.16 |
| M90 | GER Lothar Huchthausen | 26.71 |

==== Weight throw ====
Categories M35 to M45: 15.88 kg, M50–M55: 11.34 kg, M60–M65: 9.08 kg, M70–M75: 7.26 kg, M80 and over: 5.45 kg.

| Category | Winner | Result |
| M35 | FIN Jussi Tukeva | 14.98 |
| M40 | IRL John Dwyer | 16.24 |
| M45 | FIN Markus Granö | 15.00 |
| M50 | POL Mariusz Walczak | 20.43 |
| M55 | HUN Zoltán Fábián | 20.10 |
| M60 | GER Norbert Demmel | 20.43 |
| M65 | NED August Leckie | 17.55 |
| M70 | GBR Guy Dirkin | 18.89 |
| M75 | NOR Arild Busterud | 18.84 |
| M80 | AUT Heimo Viertbauer | 19.28 |
| M85 | FRA Gilbert Storq | 14.48 |
| M90 | SWE Östen Edlund | 11.70 |

==== Javelin throw ====
Categories M35 to M45: 800 g, M50–M55: 700 g, M60–M65: 600 g, M70–M75: 500 g, M80 and over: 400 g.

| Category | Winner | Result |
| M35 | ISR Denis Valiulin | 60.64 |
| M40 | POR Filipe Silva | 59.57 |
| M45 | ITA Emanuele Venturelli | 55.10 |
| M50 | GER Ralf Mordhorst | 56.41 |
| M55 | GER Paul Emck | 53.38 |
| M60 | GER Norbert Demmel | 54.92 |
| M65 | GBR John Moreland | 50.11 |
| M70 | GBR Guy Dirkin | 48.77 |
| M75 | NOR Arild Busterud | 47.33 |
| M80 | AUT Heimo Viertbauer | 45.12 |
| M85 | FRA Gilbert Storq | 39.44 |
| M90 | SWE Östen Edlund | 35.09 |

==== Throws pentathlon ====
| Category | Winner | Result |
| M35 | FIN Jussi Tukeva | 3842 |
| M40 | IRL John Dwyer | 4087 |
| M45 | FIN Markus Granö | 3901 |
| M50 | POL Mariusz Walczak | 4602 |
| M55 | HUN Zoltán Fábián | 4521 |
| M60 | GER Norbert Demmel | 4723 |
| M65 | NED August Leckie | 4199 |
| M70 | GBR Guy Dirkin | 4376 |
| M75 | NOR Arild Busterud | 4412 |
| M80 | AUT Heimo Viertbauer | 4521 |
| M85 | FRA Gilbert Storq | 3448 |
| M90 | SWE Östen Edlund | 2710 |

==== Decathlon ====
| Category | Winner | Result |
| M35 | CZE Adam Hromčík | 6205 |
| M40 | BEL Pieter Quartier | 6087 |
| M45 | SUI Pascal Merk | 6398 |
| M50 | FIN Simo Piispa | 7796 |
| M55 | SWE Mattias Sunneborn | 7576 |
| M60 | GER Gerd Westphal | 7504 |
| M65 | LTU Vytautas Zaniauskas | 7780 |
| M70 | GER Ingo Kaun | 5855 |
| M75 | FIN Jarmo Lipasti | 6486 |
| M80 | IRL John Mac Dermott | 5539 |
| M85 | LAT Janis Mankovskis | 4061 |

==== 5000 metres race walk ====
| Category | Winner | Result |
| M35 | POR Amaro Teixeira | 23:11.68 |
| M40 | POR Ricardo Vendeira | 23:43.22 |
| M45 | POR João Vieira | 21:26.78 |
| M50 | POR Augusto Cardoso | 23:31.22 |
| M55 | POR Pedro Martins | 26:26.24 |
| M60 | ESP Miguel Angel Carvajal Ortega | 24:28.48 |
| M65 | POL Leszek Behounek | 27:37.00 |
| M70 | FRA Patrice Brochot | 29:31.37 |
| M75 | GBR Peter Boszko | 31:09.28 |
| M80 | NOR Torkjell Spigseth | 34:54.38 |
| M85 | ITA Lorenzo Mazzola | 43:59.83 |
| M90 | ITA Andrea Abbiati | 44:00.57 |

==== 10 kilometres race walk ====
| Category | Winner | Result |
| M35 | POR Amaro Teixeira | 49:45 |
| M40 | ESP Aitor Santafe | 49:20 |
| M45 | POR João Vieira | 45:59 |
| M50 | POL Tomasz Lipiec | 49:09 |
| M55 | POR Pedro Martins | 55:20 |
| M60 | ESP Miguel Angel Carvajal Ortega | 50:37 |
| M65 | ITA Edoardo Alfieri | 55:24 |
| M70 | ESP Ignacio Melo Valls | 1:00:14 |
| M75 | GBR Ian Richards | 1:02:54 |
| M80 | IRL Anthony King | 1:14:53 |
| M85 | FRA Alexis Jordana | 1:23:51 |

==== 10 kilometres race walk – teams ====
| Category | Winners | Result |
| M35 | POR Amaro Teixeira; POR José Silva; POR Ricardo Vendeira | 2:37:59 |
| M40 | ESP Adrian Carballo Amador; ESP Aitor Santafe; ESP Victor Castro Mateo | 2:39:05 |
| M45 | ESP David Cervello; ESP Ivan Trujillo Jimenez; ESP Juan Manuel Morales Del Castillo | 2:33:30 |
| M50 | ESP Manuel Polo; ESP Miguel Angel Carvajal Ortega; ESP Miguel Periañez Garcia | 2:36:27 |
| M55 | ESP Ismael Mirón Gamero; ESP José Serna Lorente; ESP Leonardo Toro López | 2:57:27 |
| M60 | AUT Johann Siegele; AUT Peter Stattmann; AUT Walter Jakobitsch | 3:45:21 |
| M65 | ESP Ignacio Melo Valls; ESP Luis Abadias Palacin; ESP Pedro Jose Aranda Fernandez | 2:56:12 |
| M70 | GER Reinhard Langhammer; GER Stefan Lehmann; GER Uwe Tolle | 3:28:54 |
| M75 | FRA Claude Flamant; FRA Daniel Siegenfuhr; FRA Gerard Yves Sen | 3:35:16 |
| M80 | ITA Amatore Michieletto; ITA Biagio Giannone; ITA Lorenzo Mazzola | 4:18:42 |

==== 20 kilometres race walk ====
| Category | Winner | Result |
| M35 | POR Amaro Teixeira | 1:44:30 |
| M40 | GER Andreas Janker | 1:49:39 |
| M45 | POR João Vieira | 1:38:10 |
| M50 | POL Tomasz Lipiec | 1:42:45 |
| M55 | SWE Christer Svensson | 1:53:09 |
| M60 | ESP Miguel Periañez Garcia | 1:50:09 |
| M65 | POL Leszek Behounek | 1:57:05 |
| M70 | ESP Ignacio Melo Valls | 2:08:27 |
| M75 | GBR Peter Boszko | 2:11:53 |
| M80 | GER Wolf-Dieter Giese | 2:34:24 |

==== 20 kilometres race walk – teams ====
| Category | Winners | Result |
| M35 | POR Amaro Teixeira; POR Jaime Santos; POR João Vieira | 5:28:11 |
| M40 | POL Grzegorz Grinholc; POL Sebastian Karpiński; POL Tomasz Lipiec | 5:32:19 |
| M45 | ITA Gennaro De Lello; ITA Giancarlo Antonio Cuscunà; ITA Giancarlo Bartocci | 6:26:33 |
| M50 | FRA David Durand-Pichard; FRA Patrick Robin-Brosse; FRA Thierry Florentin | 6:04:06 |
| M55 | ITA Franco Venturi degli Esposti; ITA Gianni Siragusa; ITA Giuseppe Saponaro | 6:33:42 |
| M60 | ESP Ignacio Melo Valls; ESP Miguel Periañez Garcia; ESP Pedro Jose Aranda Fernandez | 6:01:45 |
| M65 | ITA Alessandro Volpi; ITA Edoardo Alfieri; ITA Gabriele Caldarelli | 6:21:22 |
| M70 | FRA Claude Flamant; FRA Daniel Siegenfuhr; FRA Patrice Brochot | 7:09:48 |
| M75 | GER Bernd Ocker Hoelters; GER Helmut Giebeler; GER Wolf-Dieter Giese | 7:28:37 |

==== 8 km Cross country running / 6 km Cross country running ====
Categories M35 to M65: 8 km, M70 and over: 6 km.

| Category | Winner | Result |
| M35 | POL Andrzej Starżyński | 26:18 |
| M40 | POR Ricardo Dias | 27:46 |
| M45 | ITA Luigi Del Buono | 28:06 |
| M50 | ESP Manuel Carlos Outón Besada | 28:34 |
| M55 | POR Joaquim Figueiredo | 29:36 |
| M60 | IRL Pauric McKinney | 30:41 |
| M65 | ESP Jesus Manzanares Sacristan | 32:31 |
| M70 | LUX Victor Kiessel | 26:44 |
| M75 | FRA Jean Thomas | 29:39 |
| M80 | FRA Roger Godard | 33:51 |
| M85 | GER Karl Walter Trümper | 39:46 |

==== 8 km Cross country running / 6 km Cross country running – teams ====
Categories M35 to M65: 8 km, M70 and over: 6 km.

| Category | Winners | Result |
| M35 | ESP Cristian Benítez Sánchez; ESP Ignacio García Ramón; ESP Mohammed Ben Dohhou Laouini | 1:23:53 |
| M40 | POR Ricardo Dias; POR Ricardo Silva; POR Sérgio Rodrigues | 1:28:29 |
| M45 | ITA Gabriele Frescucci; ITA Giovanni Bosio; ITA Luigi Del Buono | 1:26:45 |
| M50 | ESP José Ángel Sañudo Subiri; ESP Manuel Carlos Outón Besada; ESP Santiago de la Fuente Martin | 1:26:45 |
| M55 | POR Antonio Monteiro; POR Carlos Carneiro; POR Joaquim Figueiredo | 1:33:22 |
| M60 | GER Andreas Joswig; GER Harald Stecker; GER Juergen Hesselmann | 1:41:10 |
| M65 | IRL Philip O'Doherty; IRL Thomas O'Connor; IRL Tom Cuddy | 1:47:45 |
| M70 | FRA Dominique Gilet; FRA Jean Thomas; FRA Roger Godard | 1:30:26 |
| M75 | ESP Jesus Maria Turiso Peña; ESP Jose Antonio Torre; ESP Prudencio Perez Hernandez | 1:46:47 |
| M80 | GBR Geoff Newton; GBR Michael Johnson; GBR Phil Brennan | 1:55:36 |
| M85 | DEN Erik Bohn-Jespersen; DEN Jens Myrup Noe; DEN Vagn Kildsig | 2:36:50 |

==== 10K run ====
| Category | Winner | Result |
| M35 | POL Andrzej Starżyński | 31:15 |
| M40 | ITA Umberto Persi | 31:43 |
| M45 | POL Grzegorz Kujawski | 32:47 |
| M50 | ESP Víctor Ramon Peña Martinez | 33:22 |
| M55 | POR Amândio Correia | 32:59 |
| M60 | IRL Pauric McKinney | 35:54 |
| M65 | GBR Paul Mingay | 38:05 |
| M70 | LUX Victor Kiessel | 39:33 |
| M75 | GBR Ron Cattle | 45:25 |
| M80 | BEL Leon Segers | 50:06 |
| M85 | GER Karl Walter Trümper | 59:38 |

==== 10K run – teams ====
| Category | Winners | Result |
| M35 | ITA Luca Parisi; ITA Marco Borneti; ITA Mattia Franchini | 1:39:23 |
| M40 | ITA Luigi Del Buono; ITA Stefano Siddu; ITA Umberto Persi | 1:47:17 |
| M45 | ITA Emiliano Carloni; ITA Gabriele Frescucci; ITA Pasquale Roberto Rutigliano | 1:42:03 |
| M50 | ESP Francisco Javier Donato Rosendo; ESP José Ángel Sañudo Subiri; ESP Víctor Ramon Peña Martinez | 1:41:06 |
| M55 | ESP Angel Madrigal Segovia; ESP Jose Vicente Gadea Sanchez; ESP Roberto Clavijo Angulo | 1:46:42 |
| M60 | ESP Angel Lebrero Suárez; ESP Emilio Rodriguez Rujula; ESP Francisco García López | 1:56:14 |
| M65 | GBR Karl Hick; GBR Malcolm Eustace; GBR Paul Mingay | 2:01:02 |
| M70 | NOR Arne Skretteberg; NOR Ivar Andreas Sandoe; NOR Øystein Syversen | 2:13:46 |
| M75 | ESP Jesus Maria Turiso Peña; ESP Jose Antonio Torre; ESP Prudencio Perez Hernandez | 2:51:58 |
| M80 | GER Karl Walter Trümper; GER Siegfried Kalweit; GER Volker Fröde | 3:14:52 |

==== Half marathon ====
| Category | Winner | Result |
| M35 | POR Lopes Nuno | 1:06:17 |
| M40 | ITA Umberto Persi | 1:09:12 |
| M45 | ESP Manuel Ángel Fernández García | 1:12:32 |
| M50 | GBR Steven Davies | 1:18:34 |
| M55 | POR Amândio Correia | 1:12:38 |
| M60 | FIN Kari Kinnunen | 1:21:36 |
| M65 | GBR Paul Mingay | 1:23:30 |
| M70 | LUX Victor Kiessel | 1:26:37 |
| M75 | GBR Ron Cattle | 1:43:24 |
| M80 | BEL Leon Segers | 1:50:05 |
| M85 | FRA Jean-Louis Esnault | 2:11:08 |

==== Half marathon – teams ====
| Category | Winners | Result |
| M35 | ITA Francesco Marchetti; ITA Luca Parisi; ITA Mattia Franchini | 3:38:06 |
| M40 | POR Diogo Baena; POR Nuno Pires; POR Rui Silva | 3:51:02 |
| M45 | ITA Emiliano Carloni; ITA Luigi Del Buono; ITA Pasquale Roberto Rutigliano | 3:47:34 |
| M50 | GBR Ilia Loubenski; GBR Steve Winder; GBR Steven Davies | 4:05:07 |
| M55 | ESP Angel Madrigal Segovia; ESP Ferran de Torres Burgos; ESP Roberto Clavijo Angulo | 3:53:59 |
| M60 | GBR Andrew Blair; GBR Chris Upson; GBR Stephen Watmough | 4:14:05 |
| M65 | GBR Karl Hick; GBR Kevin McAleer; GBR Paul Mingay | 4:31:24 |
| M70 | GBR Brian Rogers; GBR Gavin Bayne; GBR Paul Whelpton | 4:52:02 |
| M80 | GER Karl Walter Trümper; GER Siegfried Kalweit; GER Volker Fröde | 7:31:31 |

=== Woman ===
==== 100 m ====
| Category | Winner | Result |
| W35 | GBR Rebecca Perry | 12.30 |
| W40 | GBR Lisa Boland | 12.49 |
| W45 | ITA Serena Caravelli | 12.79 |
| W50 | SWE Helen Hermundstad | 13.12 |
| W55 | GBR Christine Harrison-Bloomfield | 12.90 |
| W60 | ITA Monica Dessi | 14.37 |
| W65 | FRA Nicole Alexis | 14.29 |
| W70 | GBR Helen Godsell | 15.34 |
| W75 | GER Hillen von Maltzahn | 16.91 |
| W80 | SWE Barbro Bobäck | 17.07 |
| W85 | GBR Kathleen Stewart | 19.56 |
| W90 | GER Erna Antritter | 37.66 |

==== 200 m ====
| Category | Winner | Result |
| W35 | POL Iga Baumgart-Witan | 24.75 |
| W40 | GBR Lisa Boland | 25.27 |
| W45 | ITA Serena Caravelli | 25.32 |
| W50 | SWE Helen Hermundstad | 25.79 |
| W55 | GBR Christine Harrison-Bloomfield | 26.65 |
| W60 | ITA Monica Dessi | 29.33 |
| W65 | FRA Nicole Alexis | 29.72 |
| W70 | GBR Helen Godsell | 32.29 |
| W75 | FRA Michelle Peroni | 35.18 |
| W80 | SWE Barbro Bobäck | 36.86 |
| W85 | GBR Kathleen Stewart | 42.30 |

==== 400 m ====
| Category | Winner | Result |
| W35 | POL Iga Baumgart-Witan | 53.54 |
| W40 | SWE Jonna Tilgner | 57.59 |
| W45 | IRL Annette Quaid | 58.67 |
| W50 | GBR Tracey Ashworth | 59.99 |
| W55 | ESP Esther Colás | 1:02.81 |
| W60 | GBR Virginia Mitchell | 1:05.04 |
| W65 | IRL Edel Maguire | 1:08.44 |
| W70 | SWE Lilly Wizén | 1:13.66 |
| W75 | FRA Michelle Peroni | 1:20.03 |
| W80 | NED Riet Jonkers-Slegers | 1:33.32 |
| W85 | GBR Kathleen Stewart | 1:40.78 |

==== 800 m ====
| Category | Winner | Result |
| W35 | IRL Mary Horgan | 2:13.40 |
| W40 | GBR Ellie Stevens | 2:14.79 |
| W45 | IRL Denise Toner | 2:17.95 |
| W50 | BEL Sonja Boterdaele | 2:21.57 |
| W55 | ESP Esther Colás | 2:33.29 |
| W60 | IRL Anne Gilshinan | 2:26.02 |
| W65 | SWE Karin Wåhlstedt | 2:40.87 |
| W70 | GBR Anna Garnier | 3:01.38 |
| W75 | GBR Sarah Roberts | 3:05.12 |
| W80 | SWE Eva Widelund | 3:52.33 |
| W85 | GBR Betty Stracey | 5:23.18 |

==== 1500 m ====
| Category | Winner | Result |
| W35 | POL Anna Zielinkiewicz | 5:02.84 |
| W40 | GBR Ellie Stevens | 4:33.19 |
| W45 | POL Anna Rostkowska | 4:37.74 |
| W50 | BEL Sandrine Host | 4:50.91 |
| W55 | SWE Marie Dasler | 5:07.08 |
| W60 | IRL Anne Gilshinan | 4:57.93 |
| W65 | SWE Karin Wåhlstedt | 5:33.06 |
| W70 | GBR Anna Garnier | 6:48.65 |
| W75 | GBR Sarah Roberts | 6:21.83 |
| W80 | SWE Eva Widelund | 8:03.81 |
| W85 | IRL Ann Woodlock | 9:49.04 |

==== 5000 m ====
| Category | Winner | Result |
| W35 | SWE Liduina van Sitteren | 17:53.66 |
| W40 | GBR Ellie Stevens | 16:54.36 |
| W45 | ESP Elisa Hernández | 17:49.03 |
| W50 | BEL Sandrine Host | 17:43.96 |
| W55 | SWE Marie Dasler | 18:37.29 |
| W60 | GBR Clare Elms | 19:37.66 |
| W65 | ITA Oriana Martignago | 21:04.96 |
| W70 | SUI Alison Bourgeois | 23:08.69 |
| W75 | GBR Sarah Roberts | 23:11.23 |
| W80 | LAT Zinaida Racenaja | 31:55.75 |

==== 10000 m ====
| Category | Winner | Result |
| W35 | SWE Liduina van Sitteren | 36:37.00 |
| W40 | GBR Ellie Stevens | 35:23.49 |
| W45 | FRA Laëtitia Saurin | 40:57.56 |
| W50 | FRA Catherine Thomas-Pesqueux | 36:44.12 |
| W55 | SWE Marie Dasler | 39:41.23 |
| W60 | AUT Sabine Hofer | 41:29.76 |
| W65 | DEN Tove Schultz-Lorentzen | 42:41.98 |
| W70 | GER Margret Goettnauer | 49:47.54 |
| W75 | GBR Sarah Roberts | 47:41.41 |
| W80 | POL Barbara Prymakowska | 1:07:09.13 |

==== 2000 metres steeplechase ====
| Category | Winner | Result |
| W35 | POL Ewelina Brzezina | 7:17.74 |
| W40 | ESP Vanesa Pacha | 7:28.03 |
| W45 | GBR Kirstie Booth | 6:54.31 |
| W50 | ESP Nuria Etxegarai Carbajo | 8:17.22 |
| W55 | GER Katja Knospe | 8:24.05 |
| W60 | GBR Lisa Thomas | 8:46.69 |
| W65 | IRL Sue Zlnay | 9:28.17 |
| W70 | FIN Eliisa Reijonen | 11:29.45 |
| W75 | GER Hillen von Maltzahn | 11:02.58 |
| W80 | AUT Eva Fürlinger | 16:07.39 |

==== 100 metres hurdles / 80 metres hurdles ====
Category W35: 100 m, categories W40 and over: 80 m.

| Category | Winner | Result |
| W35 | NED Gejanne Lussenburg | 15.57 |
| W40 | SWE Jonna Tilgner | 11.89 |
| W45 | ITA Serena Caravelli | 11.51 |
| W50 | SWE Malin Weiland | 12.96 |
| W55 | HUN Andrea Simon-Balláné Kalamár | 13.72 |
| W60 | ITA Erika Niedermayr | 13.73 |
| W65 | NOR Anny Undheim | 14.69 |
| W70 | FRA Eliane Piret Declerck | 17.95 |
| W75 | GBR Sally Hine | 17.49 |
| W80 | DEN Kirsten Onsberg | 24.66 |

==== 400 metres hurdles / 300 metres hurdles / 200 metres hurdles ====
Categories W35 to W45: 110 m, W50–W65: 300 m, W70 and over: 200 m.

| Category | Winner | Result |
| W35 | POR Vera Lima | 1:07.24 |
| W40 | SWE Jonna Tilgner | 1:02.18 |
| W45 | GER Jennifer Gartmann | 1:09.21 |
| W50 | GBR Sarah Loades | 49.53 |
| W55 | ITA Maria Costanza Moroni | 48.96 |
| W60 | IRL Tina Gallagher | 55.59 |
| W65 | NOR Anny Undheim | 55.38 |
| W70 | SWE Ulla Karnebäck | 41.97 |
| W75 | GBR Emily McMahon | 41.11 |
| W80 | AUT Eva Fürlinger | 58.96 |

==== 4 × 100 metres relay ====
| Category | 'Winners | Result |
| W35 | GBR Allison Wilder; GBR Katy Lord; GBR Krystle Balogun; GBR Stacey Downie | 49.20 |
| W40 | NED Ioana Kanda; NED Jacqueline Pullens; NED Janneke Visser; NED Melina Congiu | 49.85 |
| W45 | GER Dana Prada; GER Kerstin Geers; GER Martina Meissner; GER Miriam Redlich | 51.64 |
| W50 | SWE Bim Paulsson; SWE Helen Hermundstad; SWE Jenny Åkervall; SWE Jenny Karlsson Rydensjö | 51.10 |
| W55 | GBR Christine Harrison-Bloomfield; GBR Diane Wright; GBR Juliet Sidney; GBR Stefanie Dornbusch | 53.84 |
| W60 | GER Birgit Burzlaff; GER Brigitte Heidrich; GER Heike Peplinski; GER Katja Berend | 57.38 |
| W65 | GER Karin Brieden; GER Kordula Wielens; GER Marion Hergarten; GER Sabine Niedanowski | 1:03.21 |
| W70 | GBR Anna Garnier; GBR Anne Nelson; GBR Doreen Craig; GBR Helen Godsell | 1:05.02 |
| W75 | GBR Emily McMahon; GBR Kathleen Stewart; GBR Sally Hine; GBR Sarah Roberts | 1:11.56 |

==== 4 × 400 metres relay ====
| Category | 'Winners | Result |
| W35 | SWE Carolina Johansson; SWE Evelina Grimstad; SWE Jonna Tilgner; SWE Sofia Turesson | 3:55.83 |
| W40 | IRL Bronwen McDonald; IRL Denise Toner; IRL Sinead O'Connor; IRL Snezana Bechtina | 3:59.34 |
| W45 | ESP Amanda Vazquez Doncel-Moriano; ESP Elisabet Ruz; ESP María Mesías Vázquez; ESP Olga Moreno Castro | 4:12.43 |
| W50 | SWE Florentina Stojakovic; SWE Helen Hermundstad; SWE Jenny Åkervall; SWE Jenny Zettergren | 4:19.24 |
| W55 | GER Anja Schönemann; GER Iris Opitz; GER Marion Stedefeld; GER Ulrike Wefers-Fritz | 4:37.80 |
| W60 | GBR Christine Anthony; GBR Jan Ellacott; GBR Lisa Thomas; GBR Virginia Mitchell | 4:30.03 |
| W65 | GBR Anna Garnier; GBR Hilary West; GBR Jeanette Ashton; GBR Louise Jeffries | 5:32.91 |
| W70 | GER Helga Rett; GER Hillen von Maltzahn; GER Margret Goettnauer; GER Marion Ertl | 6:00.42 |

==== High jump ====
| Category | Winner | Result |
| W35 | HUN Anikó Zsunyi-Horváth | 1.60 |
| W40 | FRA Marie Christine Plasse | 1.55 |
| W45 | FIN Tuire Mäki | 1.50 |
| W50 | GER Manuela Groß | 1.40 |
| W55 | ITA Monica Buizza | 1.46 |
| W60 | GBR Melanie Garland | 1.32 |
| W65 | IRL Edel Maguire | 1.32 |
| W70 | NED Anja Akkerman - Smits | 1.20 |
| W75 | ITA Ingeborg Zorzi | 1.07 |
| W80 | AUT Eva Fürlinger | 1.07 |

==== Pole vault ====
| Category | Winner | Result |
| W35 | FRA Marie Reynaert | 3.15 |
| W40 | GBR Dash Newington | 3.65 |
| W45 | FRA Elisabete Ribeiro Tavares | 3.60 |
| W50 | SWE Malin Weiland | 3.10 |
| W55 | GBR Irie Hill | 2.80 |
| W60 | GBR Sandra Pedley | 2.20 |
| W65 | NED Brigitte van de Kamp | 2.85 |
| W70 | GBR Sue Yeomans | 2.30 |

==== Long jump ====
| Category | Winner | Result |
| W35 | ROU Elena Alina Popescu | 5.43 |
| W40 | EST Kristi Võhmar | 5.64 |
| W45 | SUI Laura Torino Imberti | 5.69 |
| W50 | FRA Karine Blottin | 5.00 |
| W55 | CRO Renata Novosel | 4.96 |
| W60 | GER Birgit Burzlaff | 4.55 |
| W65 | ESP María Rosa Escribano checa | 3.86 |
| W70 | FRA Anne Kula | 3.72 |
| W75 | GER Hillen von Maltzahn | 3.37 |
| W80 | NOR Elise Marie Wåle | 2.60 |
| W85 | GER Ingrid Schäfer | 1.96 |

==== Triple jump ====
| Category | Winner | Result |
| W35 | ROU Elena Alina Popescu | 12.50 |
| W40 | GER Aurica Gründer | 11.89 |
| W45 | SUI Laura Torino Imberti | 11.92 |
| W50 | HUN Andrea Ildikó Szirbucz | 11.29 |
| W55 | SWE Annica Sandström | 10.42 |
| W60 | GBR Joanne Willoughby | 9.65 |
| W65 | ESP María Rosa Escribano checa | 8.72 |
| W70 | BEL Jocelyne Pater | 6.92 |
| W75 | GER Hillen von Maltzahn | 7.20 |
| W80 | FIN Varpu Holmberg | 5.66 |

==== Shot put ====
Categories W35 to W45: 4 kg, W50–W70: 3 kg, W75 and over: 2 kg.

| Category | Winner | Result |
| W35 | GBR Jo Rowland | 13.54 |
| W40 | DEN Maria Sløk Hansen | 13.89 |
| W45 | UKR Tetiana Nasonova | 14.30 |
| W50 | GBR Paula Williams | 13.63 |
| W55 | UKR Svitlana Sorochuk | 12.00 |
| W60 | GER Jana Schmidt | 12.58 |
| W65 | GER Uta Teuber | 10.72 |
| W70 | GRE Magdalini Tsitsoula | 9.39 |
| W75 | LTU Genovaite Kazlauskiene | 10.03 |
| W80 | AUT Marianne Maier | 10.12 |
| W85 | GBR Evaun Williams | 7.31 |
| W90 | GER Erna Antritter | 4.30 |
| W95 | AUT Christine Meesen | 3.88 |

==== Discus throw ====
Categories W35 to W70: 1 kg, W75 and over: 0.75 kg.

| Category | Winner | Result |
| W35 | FRA Aline Leclere | 38.78 |
| W40 | FRA Sibylle Retour | 46.07 |
| W45 | ESP Cristina Teixeira García | 38.31 |
| W50 | POL Joanna Wiśniewska | 43.79 |
| W55 | POL Marzena Wysocka | 38.31 |
| W60 | LTU Janina Lapieniene | 37.39 |
| W65 | NED Hannie Ebbekink Tukkers | 28.45 |
| W70 | SUI Elsbeth Häusler | 27.99 |
| W75 | HUN Mária Terézia Gosztolai | 26.74 |
| W80 | LAT Maija Jakobsone | 22.39 |
| W85 | GBR Evaun Williams | 18.70 |
| W90 | GER Erna Antritter | 7.52 |

==== Hammer throw ====
Categories W35 to W45: 4 kg, W50–W70: 3 kg, W75 and over: 2 kg.

| Category | Winner | Result |
| W35 | GBR Rachel Wilcockson | 55.97 |
| W40 | IRL Rachel Akers | 54.04 |
| W45 | FRA Séverine Bourgogne | 47.37 |
| W50 | UKR Nataliia Radionova | 48.93 |
| W55 | LUX Mireille Kosmala | 44.28 |
| W60 | FRA Claudine Cacaut | 41.37 |
| W65 | GER Elke Herzig | 40.98 |
| W70 | FIN Elisa Yli-Hallila | 31.68 |
| W75 | GER Eva Nohl | 35.69 |
| W80 | ITA Maria Luisa Fancello | 26.27 |
| W85 | GBR Evaun Williams | 28.87 |
| W90 | GER Erna Antritter | 12.72 |

==== Weight throw ====
Categories W35 to W45: 9.08 kg, W50–W55: 7.25 kg, W60–W70: 5.45 kg, W75 and over: 4 kg.

| Category | Winner | Result |
| W35 | GER Anja Schüppel | 14.68 |
| W40 | FIN Merja Korpela | 16.14 |
| W45 | UKR Tetiana Nasonova | 14.84 |
| W50 | GBR Andrea Jenkins | 18.59 |
| W55 | LUX Mireille Kosmala | 15.81 |
| W60 | GER Margret Klein-Raber | 17.37 |
| W65 | GER Elke Herzig | 15.68 |
| W70 | NOR Inger Marie Vingdal | 14.15 |
| W75 | LTU Genovaite Kazlauskiene | 13.67 |
| W80 | DEN Kirsten Onsberg | 9.80 |
| W85 | GBR Evaun Williams | 9.79 |
| W90 | GER Erna Antritter | 4.55 |

==== Javelin throw ====
Categories W35 to W45: 600 g, W50–W70: 500 g, W75 and over: 400 g.

| Category | Winner | Result |
| W35 | FRA Aline Leclere | 45.12 |
| W40 | FRA Sibylle Retour | 43.89 |
| W45 | ESP Cristina Teixeira García | 41.77 |
| W50 | POL Joanna Wiśniewska | 44.38 |
| W55 | POL Marzena Wysocka | 42.31 |
| W60 | LTU Janina Lapieniene | 40.39 |
| W65 | NED Hannie Ebbekink Tukkers | 38.45 |
| W70 | SUI Elsbeth Häusler | 36.99 |
| W75 | HUN Mária Terézia Gosztolai | 34.74 |
| W80 | LAT Maija Jakobsone | 32.39 |
| W85 | GBR Evaun Williams | 28.70 |
| W90 | GER Erna Antritter | 17.52 |

==== Throws pentathlon ====
| Category | Winner | Result |
| W35 | GER Anja Schüppel | 3842 |
| W40 | FIN Merja Korpela | 4087 |
| W45 | UKR Tetiana Nasonova | 3901 |
| W50 | GBR Andrea Jenkins | 4602 |
| W55 | LUX Mireille Kosmala | 4521 |
| W60 | GER Margret Klein-Raber | 4723 |
| W65 | GER Elke Herzig | 4199 |
| W70 | NOR Inger Marie Vingdal | 4376 |
| W75 | LTU Genovaite Kazlauskiene | 4412 |
| W80 | DEN Kirsten Onsberg | 4521 |
| W85 | GBR Evaun Williams | 3448 |
| W90 | GER Erna Antritter | 2710 |

==== Heptathlon ====
| Category | Winner | Result |
| W35 | GBR Jo Rowland | 5120 |
| W40 | FRA Elodie Valle | 4943 |
| W45 | GER Dana Prada | 5645 |
| W50 | SWE Malin Weiland | 5130 |
| W55 | GER Tatjana Schilling | 6420 |
| W60 | IRL Tina Gallagher | 4777 |
| W65 | ESP María Rosa Escribano checa | 5377 |
| W70 | NED Anja Akkerman - Smits | 5082 |
| W75 | ITA Ingeborg Zorzi | 3697 |
| W80 | FIN Varpu Holmberg | 2312 |

==== 5000 metres race walk ====
| Category | Winner | Result |
| W35 | NED Anne Van Andel | 25:06.82 |
| W40 | POR Vera Santos | 24:23.92 |
| W45 | ITA Rosetta La Delfa | 24:14.05 |
| W50 | GER Bianca Schenker | 26:26.45 |
| W55 | HUN Katalin Bodorkós-Horváth | 27:17.20 |
| W60 | GER Sigute Brönnecke | 28:33.46 |
| W65 | POL Janina Łuniewska | 30:51.74 |
| W70 | FRA Janine Vignat | 30:11.38 |
| W75 | GER Renate Köhler | 38:10.90 |
| W80 | ITA Teresa Aufiero | 48:25.51 |
| W85 | GER Helga Dräger | 48:31.40 |

==== 10 kilometres race walk ====
| Category | Winner | Result |
| W35 | ITA Silvia Da Re | 53:07 |
| W40 | FRA Vanessa Denisselle | 50:12 |
| W45 | ITA Rosetta La Delfa | 50:01 |
| W50 | GER Bianca Schenker | 55:13 |
| W55 | HUN Katalin Bodorkós-Horváth | 57:06 |
| W60 | GER Sigute Brönnecke | 1:00:40 |
| W65 | POL Janina Łuniewska | 1:03:38 |
| W70 | FRA Janine Vignat | 1:03:34 |
| W75 | GER Renate Köhler | 1:18:36 |
| W80 | ITA Teresa Aufiero | 1:37:59 |
| W85 | GER Helga Dräger | 1:41:24 |

==== 10 kilometres race walk – teams ====
| Category | 'Winners | Result |
| W35 | ITA Elena Cinca; ITA Rosetta La Delfa; ITA Silvia Da Re | 2:47:42 |
| W40 | FRA Elodie Varoquier; FRA Hélène Cottreau; FRA Vanessa Denisselle | 2:49:48 |
| W45 | ROU Cristina-Violeta Cimpoies; ROU Mioara Facaoaru; ROU Szekely Marinela | 3:36:40 |
| W50 | GER Bianca Schenker; GER Brit Schröter; GER Jana Keller | 2:54:18 |
| W55 | GBR Melanie Peddle; GBR Susan Payne; GBR Wendy Kane | 3:05:47 |
| W60 | ESP Antonia Royo Fabregat; ESP Carmen Garcia Frontons; ESP Isabel Ruiz-Ayucar Seifert | 3:17:52 |
| W65 | GER Brigitte Patrzalek; GER Cora Kruse; GER Maria Rita Echle | 3:37:56 |
| W70 | FRA Claudine Anxionnat; FRA Edith Brochot; FRA Janine Vignat | 3:29:16 |
| W75 | GER Heidrun Neidel; GER Helga Dräger; GER Renate Köhler | 4:27:21 |

==== 20 kilometres race walk ====
| Category | Winner | Result |
| W35 | AUT Barbara Hollinger | 2:00:59 |
| W40 | FRA Vanessa Denisselle | 1:44:58 |
| W45 | BUL Mariya Angelova | 1:57:58 |
| W50 | GER Bianca Schenker | 1:58:14 |
| W55 | HUN Katalin Bodorkós-Horváth | 1:59:46 |
| W60 | GER Sigute Brönnecke | 2:10:07 |
| W65 | GBR Susan Payne | 2:16:25 |
| W70 | POR Maria Mendes | 2:22:21 |
| W75 | GER Renate Köhler | 3:07:08 |

==== 20 kilometres race walk – teams ====
| Category | 'Winners | Result |
| W35 | GBR Aleksandra Majewska-Ani; GBR Carolyn Derbyshire; GBR Wendy Kane | 6:45:01 |
| W40 | FRA Claire Bertrand; FRA Elodie Varoquier; FRA Vanessa Denisselle | 5:44:27 |
| W50 | ESP Antonia Royo Fabregat; ESP Isabel Ruiz-Ayucar Seifert; ESP Olga Cabrera Ysas | 6:38:18 |
| W55 | FRA Claudine Anxionnat; FRA Laurence Sina; FRA Valérie Boban | 6:41:01 |
| W60 | GER Birgit Komoll; GER Maria Rita Echle; GER Sigute Brönnecke | 7:13:49 |

==== 8 km Cross country running / 6 km Cross country running ====
Categories W35 to W45: 8 km, W50 and over: 6 km.

| Category | Winner | Result |
| W35 | SWE Liduina van Sitteren | 32:13 |
| W40 | ESP Laura Cebollada Martínez | 34:13 |
| W45 | IRL Michelle Kenny | 32:46 |
| W50 | GER Karen Paysen | 34:17 |
| W55 | FRA Karine Cheron | 34:18 |
| W60 | AUT Sabine Hofer | 35:27 |
| W65 | IRL Sue Zlnay | 41:04 |
| W70 | IRL Christine Kennedy | 29:54 |
| W75 | IRL Eileen Kenny | 32:45 |
| W80 | POL Barbara Prymakowska | 39:29 |
| W85 | GBR Betty Stracey | 57:13 |

==== 8 km Cross country running / 6 km Cross country running – teams ====
Categories W35 to W45: 8 km, W50 and over: 6 km.

| Category | 'Winners | Result |
| W35 | ROU Anca Maria Iuga; ROU Bors Paraschiva; ROU Georgeta Alexandra Romanciuc | 1:48:52 |
| W40 | ESP Laura Cebollada Martínez; ESP Noelia Munoz Ramos; ESP Yurena Castrillo | 1:47:01 |
| W45 | ESP Jane Wickham; ESP Monserrat Agudo Vicente; ESP Nidia Zulma Borget Ruidiaz | 1:53:41 |
| W50 | POL Ewa Brych-Kalinowska; POL Magdalena Białorczyk; POL Magdalena Lachowska | 1:48:27 |
| W55 | IRL Annette Kealy; IRL Jacqueline McMonagle; IRL Martina Mcdonagh | 1:52:43 |
| W60 | SWE Karin Schön; SWE Katarina Loef Hagstroem; SWE Marie Olsson | 1:53:22 |
| W65 | ESP Angeles Rodríguez del Río; ESP Antonia Ruiperez Balsalobre; ESP Begoña Minayo | 2:35:16 |

==== 10K run ====
| Category | Winner | Result |
| W35 | BEL Nina Lauwaert | 37:32 |
| W40 | GBR Ellie Stevens | 34:39 |
| W45 | IRL Michelle Kenny | 38:11 |
| W50 | GER Karen Paysen | 40:32 |
| W55 | SWE Marie Dasler | 38:58 |
| W60 | GBR Clare Elms | 40:25 |
| W65 | ITA Oriana Martignago | 42:16 |
| W70 | GER Margret Goettnauer | 49:40 |
| W75 | GBR Sarah Roberts | 46:11 |
| W80 | LAT Zinaida Racenaja | 1:14:02 |

==== 10K run – teams ====
| Category | 'Winners | Result |
| W35 | POL Aneta Suwaj; POL Ewa Jagielska; POL Ewelina Brzezina | 1:57:27 |
| W40 | GBR Ellie Stevens; GBR Lisa Gawthorne; GBR Stephanie Fauset | 1:54:27 |
| W45 | GBR Clare Elms; GBR Valerie Woodland; GBR Zoe Oldfield | 2:02:51 |
| W50 | GER Anja Dircks; GER Ariane Stapusch; GER Karen Paysen | 2:09:24 |
| W55 | SWE Karin Schön; SWE Katarina Loef Hagstroem; SWE Marie Dasler | 2:07:59 |
| W60 | POR Delfina Rompante; POR Dores França; POR Graça Costa | 2:50:50 |
| W65 | GBR Fiona Bishop; GBR Sian Davies; GBR Susan Payne | 2:30:51 |
| W70 | GBR Dorothy Kesterton; GBR Louise Rowley; GBR Sara Anne Ellen | 2:34:44 |
| W75 | GBR Anne Dockery; GBR Carolyn Gale; GBR Sarah Roberts | 2:41:23 |

==== Half marathon ====
| Category | Winner | Result |
| W35 | NED Anne Van Andel | 1:30:12 |
| W40 | GBR Ellie Stevens | 1:18:12 |
| W45 | IRL Catherine O Connor | 1:28:34 |
| W50 | BEL Greet Verdonckt | 1:27:58 |
| W55 | GBR Lisa Finlay | 1:24:31 |
| W60 | AUT Sabine Hofer | 1:30:36 |
| W65 | GER Sabine Engelmann | 1:42:50 |
| W70 | IRL Christine Kennedy | 1:40:08 |
| W75 | GER Gudrun Vogl | 1:58:27 |

==== Half marathon – teams ====
| Category | 'Winners | Result |
| W35 | GER Heike Kalweit; GER Luise Dobmeier; GER Sara Wippich | 5:28:52 |
| W40 | GBR Catherine Charlton; GBR Catherine Simpson; GBR Ellie Stevens | 4:19:24 |
| W45 | IRL Anne Hegarty; IRL Catherine O Connor; IRL Kay Byrne | 4:59:22 |
| W50 | ESP Faustina María Ramos; ESP Maria Jose Pueyo Bergua; ESP Sandra Sánchez García | 4:34:27 |
| W55 | IRL Annette Kealy; IRL Donna Evans; IRL Martina Mcdonagh | 4:40:31 |
| W65 | IRL Christine Kennedy; IRL Nuala Reilly; IRL Sue Zlnay | 5:28:09 |
| W75 | GER Gudrun Vogl; GER Irene Klas-Gundel; GER Maria Brigitte Nittel | 6:56:16 |

=== Mixed ===
==== 4 × 400 metres relay ====
| Category | Winners | Result |
| MIX35 | GBR Craig Cox; GBR Kat Sutton; GBR Krystle Balogun; GBR Lewis Robson | 3:36.07 |
| MIX40 | SWE Carolina Johansson; SWE Joachim Ögren; SWE Jonna Tilgner; SWE Kit Eklöf | 3:39.33 |
| MIX45 | ITA Barbato De Stefano; ITA Francesco Nadalutti; ITA Maria de Lourde Quinonez; ITA Serena Caravelli | 3:49.72 |
| MIX50 | SWE Helen Hermundstad; SWE Jenny Åkervall; SWE Mattias Sunneborn; SWE Peter Wallin | 3:44.59 |
| MIX55 | ESP Carmen Franco San Jose; ESP Donato Ramírez; ESP Esther Colás; ESP Juan Luis López Anaya | 3:56.45 |
| MIX60 | GBR Lisa Thomas; GBR Vincent Elie; GBR Virginia Mitchell; GBR Wole Odele | 4:04.77 |
| MIX65 | SWE Bobbie Baars; SWE Gunnel Tolfes; SWE Karin Wåhlstedt; SWE Michael Cocke | 4:35.66 |
| MIX70 | GER Helga Rett; GER Margret Goettnauer; GER Reinhard Michelchen; GER Wolfgang Kreemke | 4:57.21 |
| MIX75 | GER Friedhelm Adorf; GER Gudrun Liedtke; GER Hillen von Maltzahn; GER Ulrich Becker | 6:17.84 |
| MIX80 | FIN Helinä Pihlaja; FIN Jouko Ylä-Liedenpohja; FIN Markku Juopperi; FIN Varpu Holmberg | 7:57.70 |

== Gallery ==
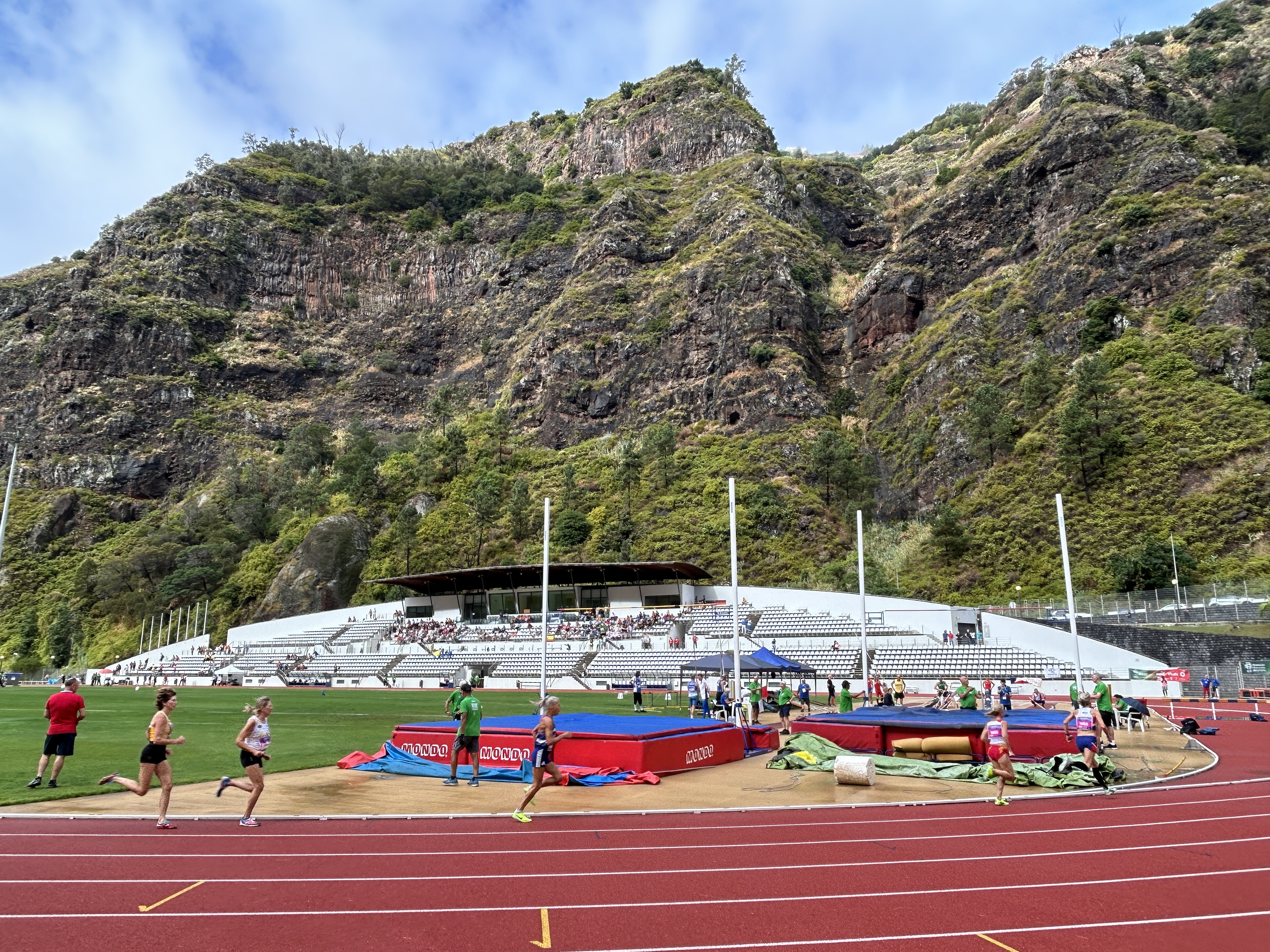
800 m woman on Centro Desportivo da Madeira in Ribeira Brava

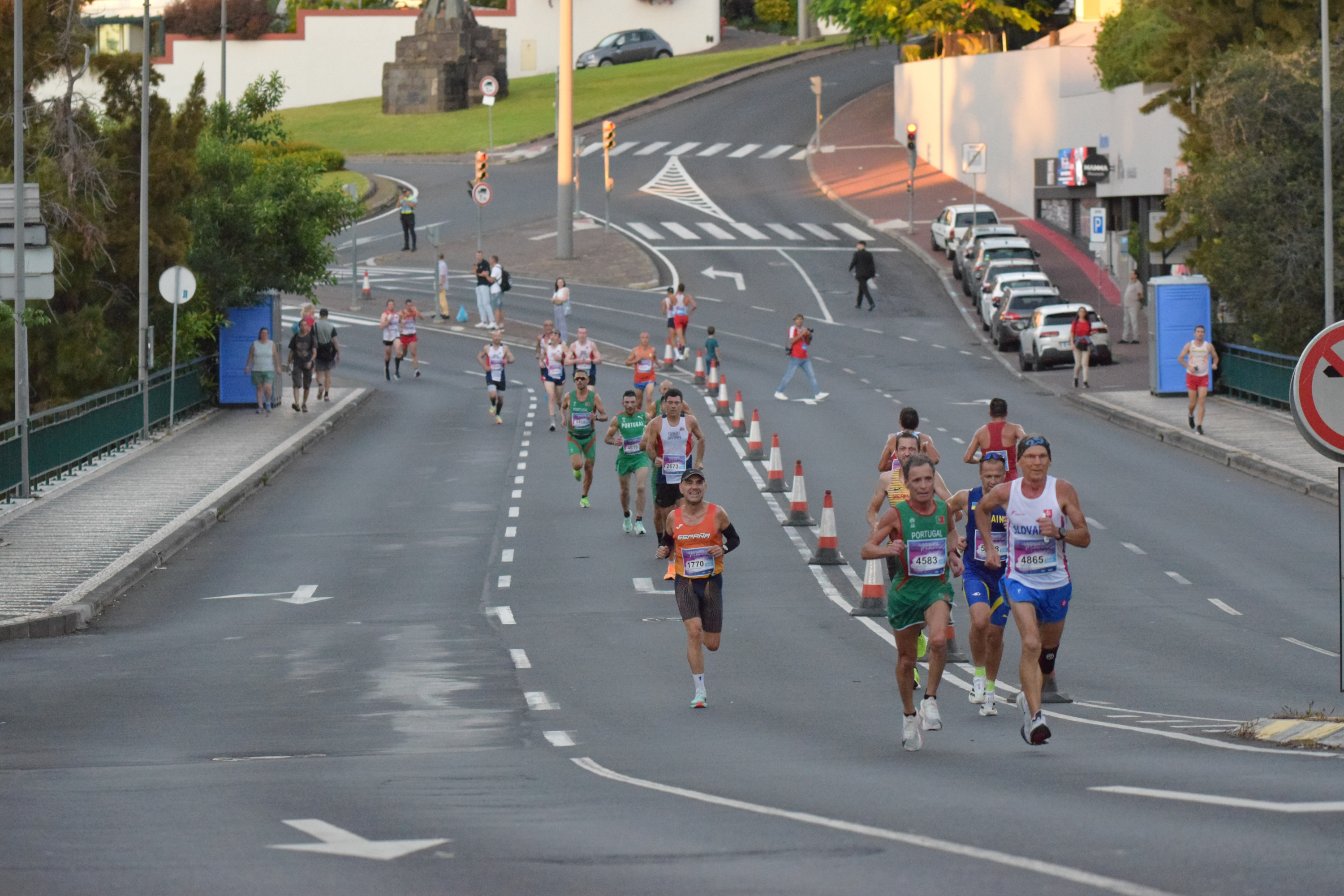
Half marathon on the streets of Funchal

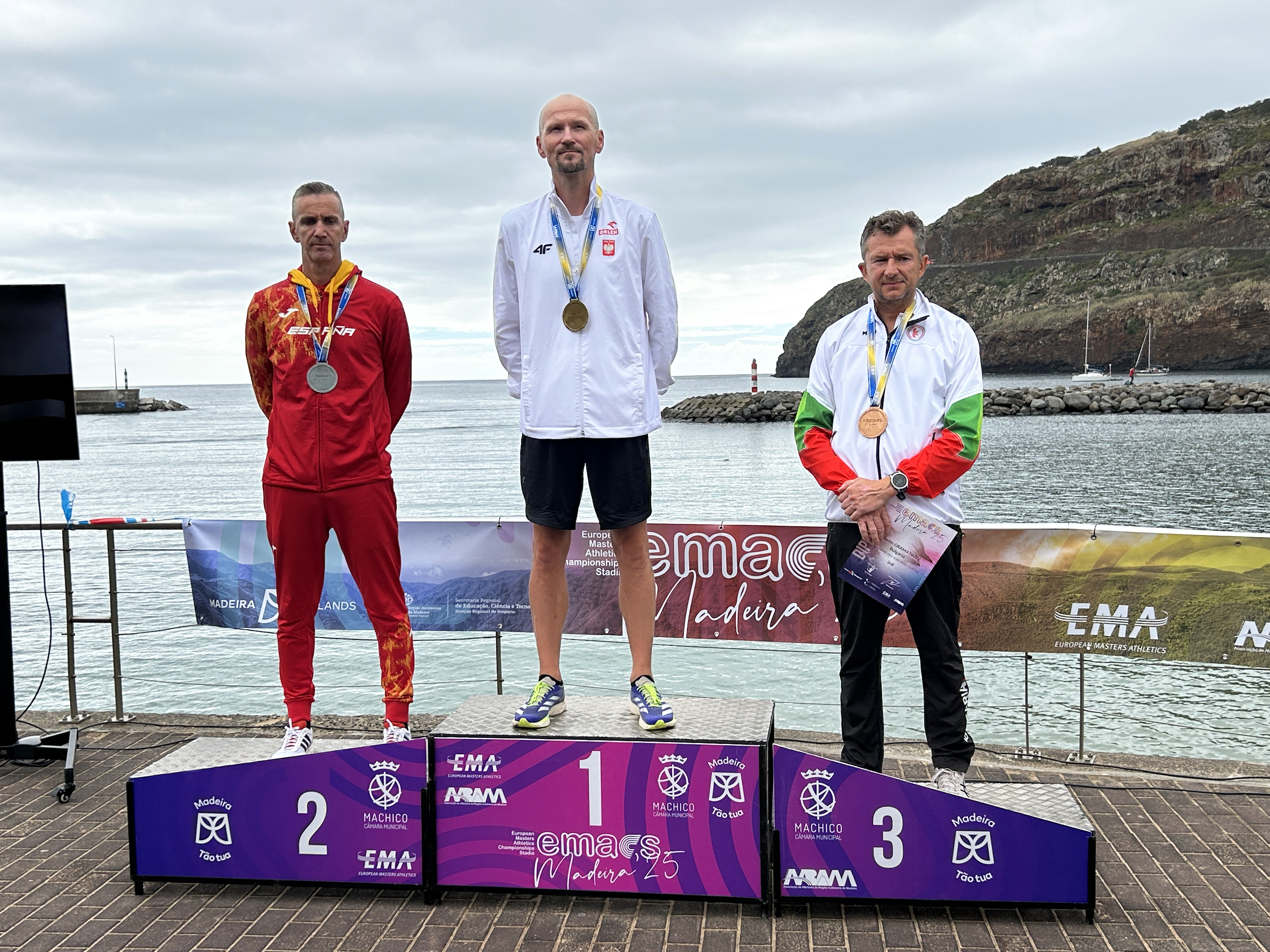
20 km walk M50 podium. From the left: Ruben Piñera Álvarez, Tomasz Lipiec and Martin Gramatikov

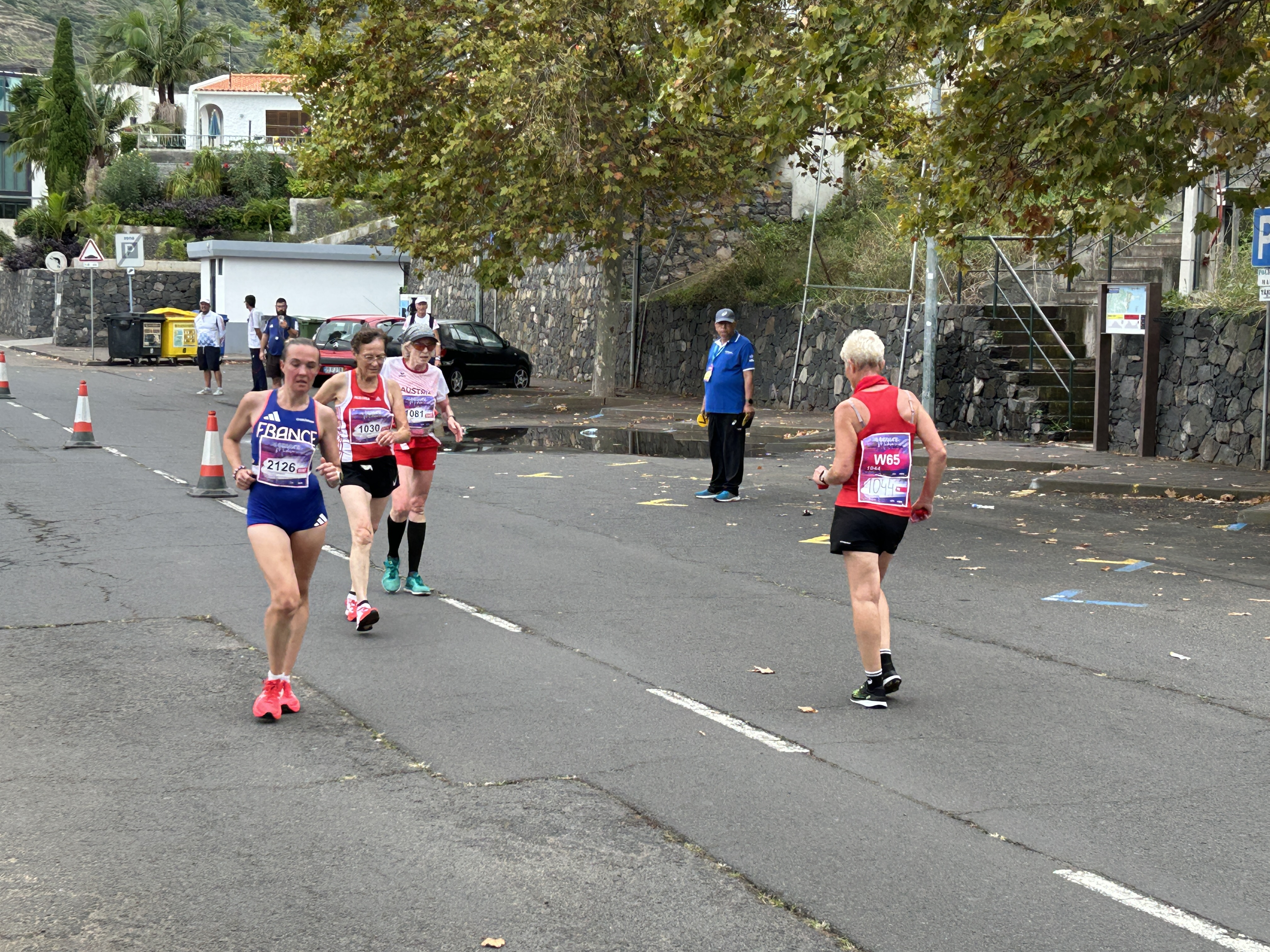
20 km walk on the streets of Machico
