= Masters M65 hammer throw world record progression =

Masters M65 hammer throw world record progression is the progression of world record improvements of the hammer throw M65 division of Masters athletics. Records must be set in properly conducted, official competitions under the standing IAAF rules unless modified by World Masters Athletics. The M65 division consists of male athletes who have reached the age of 65 but have not yet reached the age of 70, so exactly from their 65th birthday to the day before their 70th birthday. The M65 division throws a 5 kg implement.

Key

Incomplete information Pending

Distance	Athlete	Nationality	Birthdate	Location	Date
60.65	Arild Busterud	Norway	26.01.1948	Tønsberg	23.07.2013
55.74	Ed Burke	United States	04.03.1940	Sacramento	01.07.2006
55.70	Eugén Von Waltercrantz	Sweden	25.06.1939	Helsingborg	11.08.2005
53.82	Arne Lothe	Norway	22.05.1938	Hyen	26.03.2005
53.32	Karl Heinz Wendel	Germany	17.06.1930	Medelby	07.09.1997
52.56	Guy Husson	France	02.03.1931	Anzin	01.06.1996
51.94	Richard Rzehak	Germany	13.10.1929	Pfaffenhofen	28.10.1995
51.80	Pentti Saarikoski	Finland	13.01.1926	Vammala	21.09.1992
48.96	Eino Anttila	Finland	03.02.1923	San Diego	1989
