= Masters M90 hammer throw world record progression =

Masters M90 hammer throw world record progression is the progression of world record improvements of the hammer throw M90 division of Masters athletics. Records must be set in properly conducted, official competitions under the standing IAAF rules unless modified by World Masters Athletics. The M90 division consists of male athletes who have reached the age of 90 but have not yet reached the age of 95, so exactly from their 90th birthday to the day before their 95th birthday. The M90 division throws a 3 kg implement.

Key

Incomplete information Pending

Distance	Athlete	Nationality	Birthdate	Age	Location	Date	Ref
28.97 m	Lothar Huchthausen	Germany	13 March 1935	90 years, 218 days	Madeira	17 October 2025	
28.58 m	Östen Edlund	Sweden	26 November 1934	90 years, 199 days	Tingstäde	13 June 2025	
28.48 m	Zdeněk Vašata	Czech Republic	26 May 1930	90 years, 95 days	Pacov	29 August 2020	
27.82 m	Harvey Lewellen	United States	15 February 1929	90 years, 127 days	Portland	22 June 2019	
25.82 m	Harvey Lewellen	United States	15 February 1929	90 years, 148 days	Ames	13 July 2019	
25.28 m	Curt Davison	United States	1925	91	Birmingham	7 June 2017	
25.99 m	Armas Rantala	Finland	20 May 1926	90 years, 87 days	Iisalmi	15 August 2016	
24.61 m	John Fraser	Australia	24 November 1914	90 years, 109 days	Melbourne	13 March 2005	
20.93 m	Mario Riboni	Italy	13 June 1913	90 years, 121 days	Macerata	12 October 2003	
