= Arne Lothe =

Arne Lothe (born 22 May 1938 in Sandane) is a Norwegian track and field athlete, known primarily for the hammer throw. He is a five time national champion, winning in 1967, 1968, 1972, 1973 and 1974. He continued throwing into the masters age divisions. In 1999, he set the world record in the M60 division. In 2005, he also improved the M65 world record. Professionally, he was a police officer in Bergen.
