= Masters M60 hammer throw world record progression =

Masters M60 hammer throw world record progression is the progression of world record improvements of the hammer throw M60 division of Masters athletics. Records must be set in properly conducted, official competitions under the standing IAAF rules unless modified by World Masters Athletics. The M60 division consists of male athletes who have reached the age of 60 but have not yet reached the age of 65, so exactly from their 60th birthday to the day before their 65th birthday. The M60 division throws a 5 kg implement.

Key

Incomplete information Pending

Distance	Athlete	Nationality	Birthdate	Location	Date
63.32	Arild Busterud	Norway	26.01.1948	Ljubljana	24.07.2008
61.96	Boris Zaychuk	Canada	28.08.1947	Riccione	09.09.2007
61.76	Tom Gage	United States	16.05.1943	Reading	14.08.2004
61.70	Eugen Von Waltercrantz	Sweden	25.06.1939	Helsingborg	25.09.1999
61.19	Arne Lothe	Norway	22.05.1938	Knarvik	13.03.1999
59.72	Hans Pötsch	Austria	02.03.1933	Szombathely	31.07.1993
58.00	Pentti Saarikoski	Finland	13.01.1926	Rauma	26.08.1987
