= Arild Busterud =

Norwegian track and field athlete

Personal information
- Nationality: Norwegian
- Born: January 26, 1948 Løten, Norway

Sport
- Sport: Track and field
- Event: Hammer throw

Arild Busterud (born 26 January 1948 in Løten) is a Norwegian track and field athlete known for the hammer throw. He won two successive national championships in 1975 and 1976. He continued throwing into masters age groups, setting the world record in the M60 division at the time. While the Masters division throws lighter implements as competitors get older, his world record is less than half a meter less than his (nearly identical) national championship winning marks.
