= Östen Edlund =

Swedish discus thrower

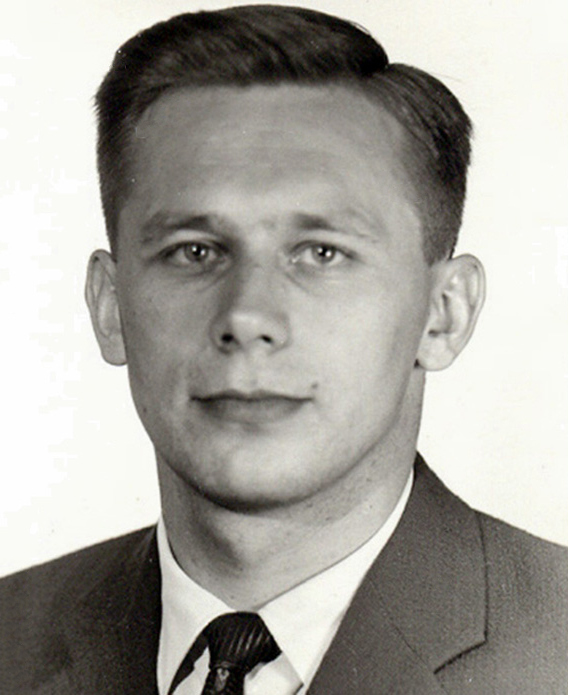

Personal information
- Born: 26 November 1934 (age 91) Ragunda, Sweden
- Height: 181 cm (5 ft 11 in)
- Weight: 84 kg (185 lb)

Sport
- Sport: Athletics
- Event: Discus throw
- Club: Kronobergs IK, Stockholm

Achievements and titles
- Personal best: 53.88 m (1960)

Rolf Östen Edlund (born 26 November 1934) is a Swedish discus thrower. He placed 17th at the 1958 European Championships and 24th at the 1960 Summer Olympics. He continues competing in his eightieth, winning the world title in the M80 age group at the 2015 World Masters Athletics Championships.
