= 2014 European Masters Athletics Championships =

Held at İzmir in Turkey

- Dates: 22–31 August
- Host city: İzmir, Turkey
- Venue: Atatürk Olympic Stadium
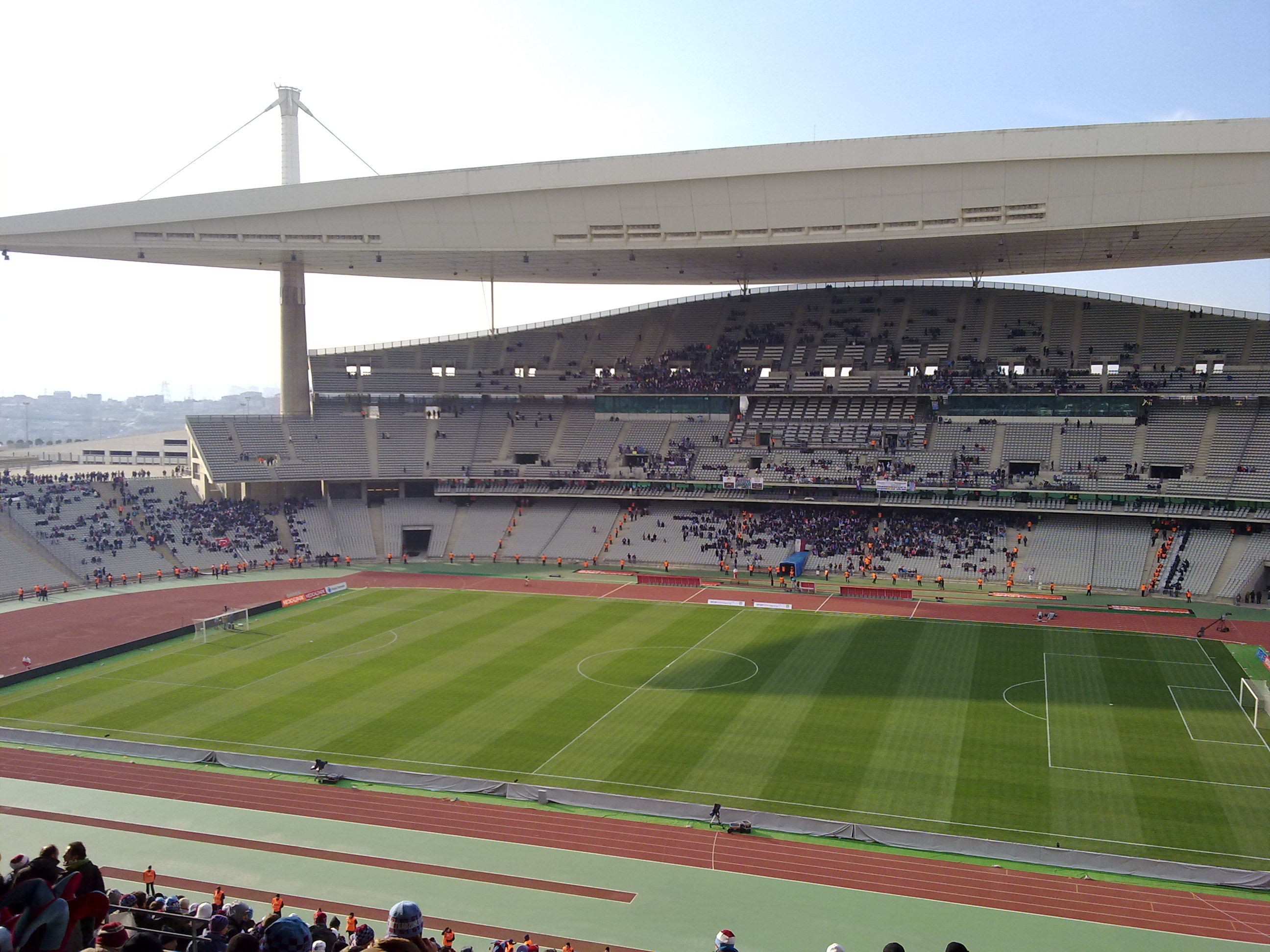
- Level: Masters
- Type: Stadia
- Participation: 2027 athletes from 41 nations

The nineteenth European Masters Athletics Championships were held in İzmir, Turkey, from August 22–31, 2014. The European Masters Athletics Championships serve the division of the sport of athletics for people over 35 years of age, referred to as masters athletics.

The event had many fewer participants than the previous edition, although three more nations took part than did previously.

== Events ==
The following events took place:

=== Men ===
Event/Age	M35	M40	M45	M50	M55	M60	M65	M70	M75	M80	M85	M90
100 metres	X	X	X	X	X	X	X	X	X	X	X	X
200 metres	X	X	X	X	X	X	X	X	X	X	X	X
400 metres	X	X	X	X	X	X	X	X	X	X	X	-
800 metres	X	X	X	X	X	X	X	X	X	X	X	-
1500 metres	X	X	X	X	X	X	X	X	X	X	-	
5000 metres	X	X	X	X	X	X	X	X	X	X	X	-
10000 metres	X	X	X	X	X	X	X	X	X	X	-	-
110 metres hurdles	X	X	X	-	-	-	-	-	-	-	-	-
100 metres hurdles	-	-	-	X	X	X	X	-	-	-	-	-
80 metres hurdles	-	-	-	-	-	-	-	X	X	X	-	-
400 metres hurdles	X	X	X	X	X	X	-	-	-	-	-	-
300 metres hurdles	-	-	-	-	-	-	X	X	X	-	-	-
200 metres hurdles	-	-	-	-	-	-	-	-	-	X	-	-
3000 metres steeplechase	X	X	X	X	X	X	-	-	-	-	-	-
2000 metres steeplechase	-	-	-	-	-	X	X	X	X	X	-	-
4×100 metres relay	X	X	X	X	X	X	X	X	X	X	X	-
4×400 metres relay	X	X	X	X	X	X	X	X	X	-	-	-
Marathon	X	X	X	X	X	X	X	X	X	X	-	-
High jump	X	X	X	X	X	X	X	X	X	X	X	-
Pole vault	X	X	X	X	X	X	X	X	X	X	-	-
Long jump	X	X	X	X	X	X	X	X	X	X	X	
Triple jump	X	X	X	X	X	X	X	X	X	X	X	-
Shot put	X	X	X	X	X	X	X	X	X	X	X	X
Discus throw	X	X	X	X	X	X	X	X	X	X	X	X
Hammer throw	X	X	X	X	X	X	X	X	X	X	X	
Javelin throw	X	X	X	X	X	X	X	X	X	X	X	X
Weight throw	X	X	X	X	X	X	X	X	X	X	X	-
Throws pentathlon	X	X	X	X	X	X	X	X	X	X	X	X
Decathlon	X	X	X	X	X	X	X	X	X	X	-	-
5000 metre track race walk	X	X	X	X	X	X	X	X	X	X	-	X
20000 metre road race walk	X	X	X	X	X	X	X	X	X	X	-	-
