= Izmir Marathon =

Annual race in Turkey since 2020

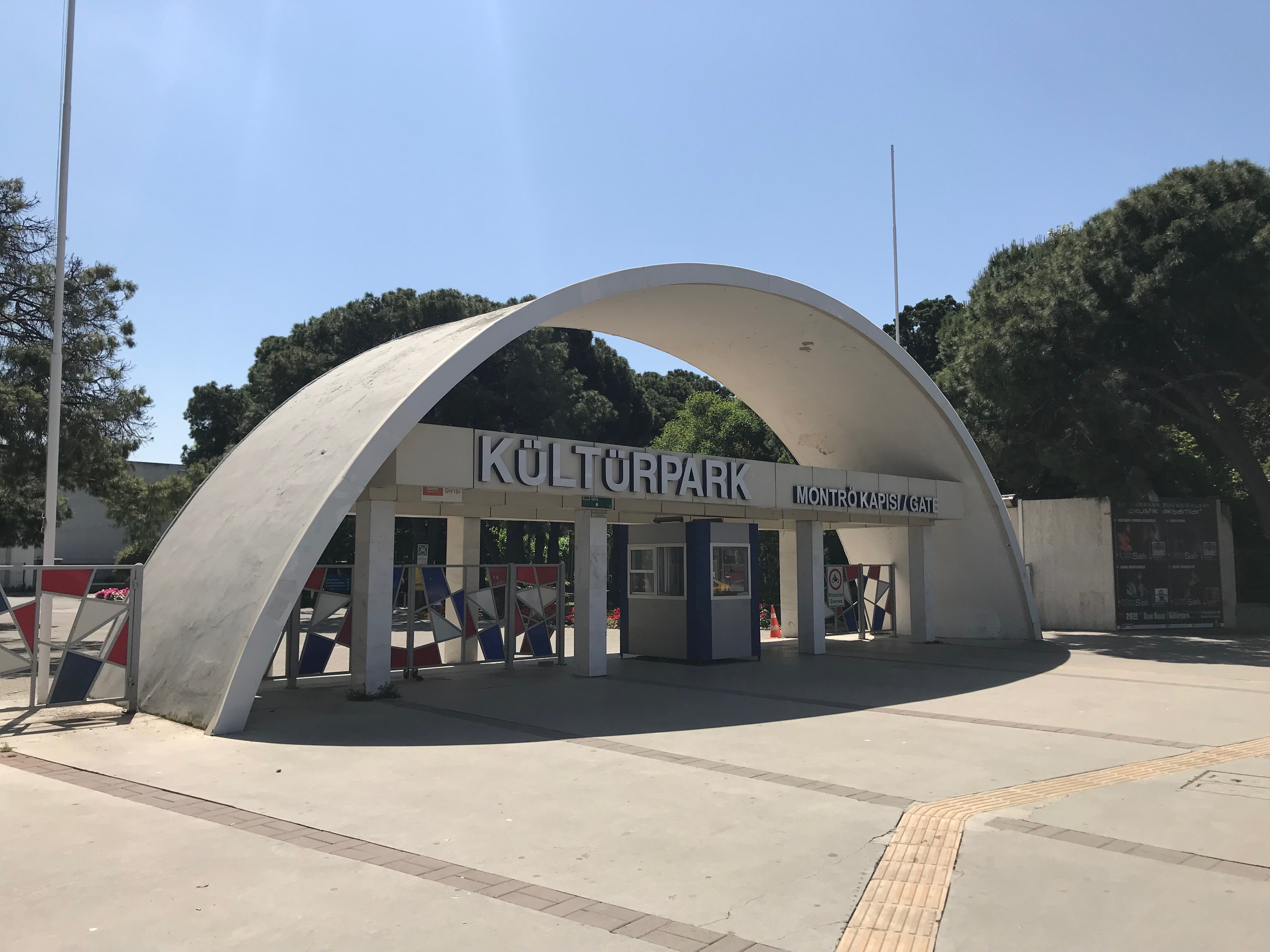
- Montreux Gate of Kültürpark, near the start and finish
- Date: April
- Location: İzmir, Turkey
- Event type: Road
- Distance: Marathon, 10K
- Established: 2020 (6 years ago)
- Course records: Men's: 2:09:27 (2022) (Kenya) Lani Rutto; Women's: 2:25:25 (2021) (Ethiopia) Betelhem Moges
- Website: Izmir Marathon

The Izmir Marathon (Turkish: Maraton İzmir) is an annual road-based marathon hosted by İzmir, Turkey, since 2020. A 10K is also held concurrently with the marathon.

The marathon is a World Athletics Label Road Race.

== History ==
The inaugural race was held on 4 October 2020 during the coronavirus pandemic.

Kenyan runner Lani Rutto set a Turkish all-comers record of 2:09:27 during the 2022 race.

== Course ==
External image
- Course map of full marathon in 2022

The marathon begins and ends on Şair Eşref Boulevard in front of Kültürpark, just north of the Montrö Gate, and runs largely along the coastline.

Marathoners first head northeast from the start and then roughly follow the coastline until a turnaround point near Bostanlı Pier in Karşıyaka about 12.5 km (7.8 mi) into the race. The course then heads in the other direction while continuing to keep mostly to the coastline until a second turnaround point around the 33 km (21 mi) mark, on Haydar Aliyev Boulevard near the Çakalburnu Lagoon. Runners then follow the same path back to the city center before turning east onto Gazi Boulevard about 1 km (0.6 mi) from the finish, and then northeast back onto Şair Eşref Boulevard for the final stretch.

== Winners ==
Key: Course record

Edition	Year	Men's winner	Time (min:sec)	Women's winner	Time (h:m:s)
1st	2020	Bernard Sang (KEN)	2:18:16	Judith Korir (KEN)	2:33:59
2nd	2021	Tsegaye Getachew (ETH)	2:09:35	Betelhem Moges (ETH)	2:25:25
3rd	2022	Lani Rutto (KEN)	2:09:27	Letebrhan Gebreslasea (ETH)	2:27:35
4th	2023	Benard Kipkorir (KEN)	2:10:25	Shewarge Alene (ETH)	2:32:43
5th	2024	Vitalis Kibiwott (KEN)	2:11:08	Aamelmal Tagel (ETH)	2:37:26

=== Wins by country ===
Country	Men's	Women's	Total
Ethiopia	4	1	5
Kenya	1	4	5

== Other marathons ==
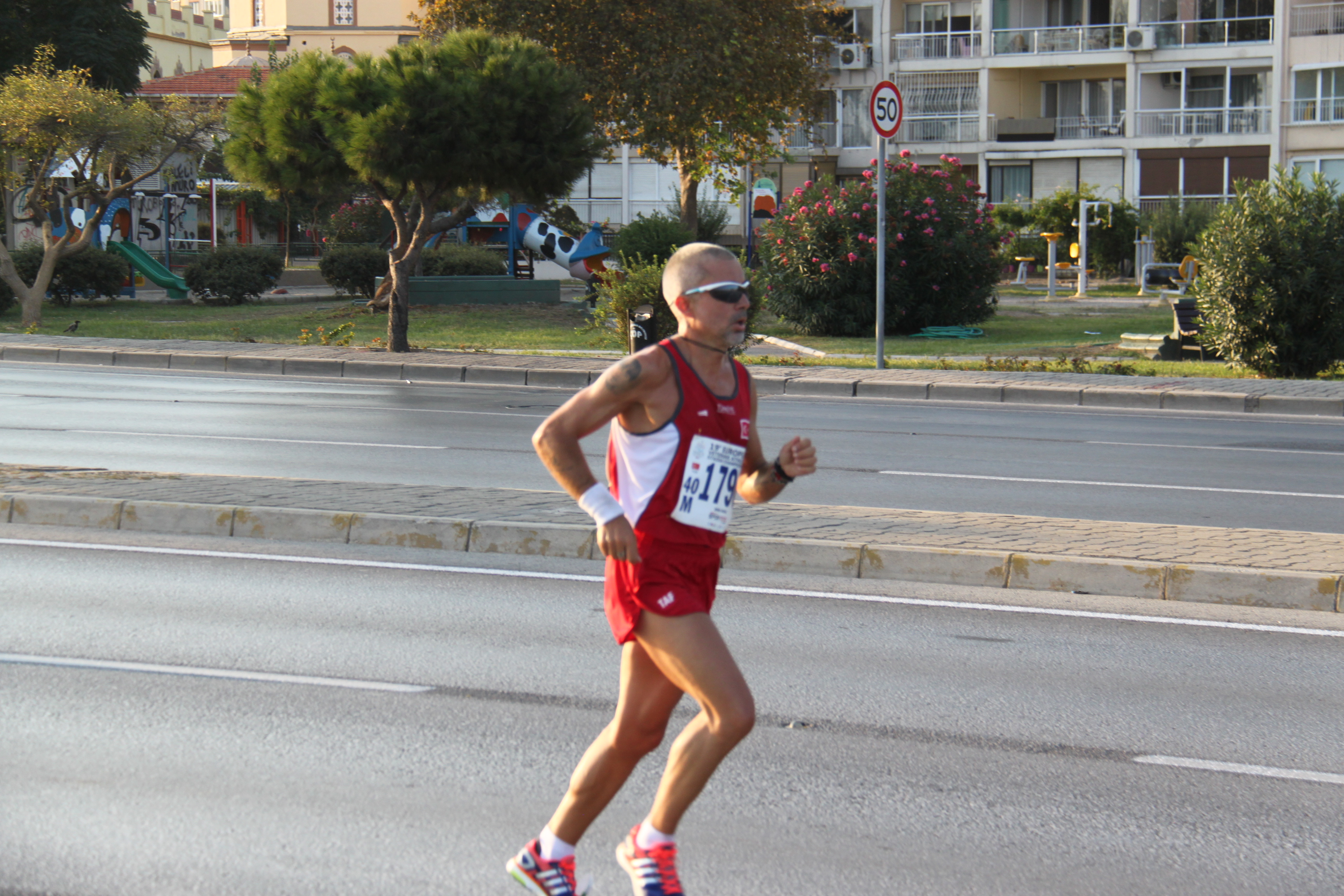
Participant during the marathon event of the 2014 European Masters Athletics Championships

İzmir has previously hosted other marathons, including the marathon event of the 2014 European Masters Athletics Championships, held on 30 August 2014.
