= Deso Gelmisa =

Ethiopian long-distance runner

Chalu Deso Gelmisa
Personal information
- Nationality: Ethiopian
- Born: 14 December 1997 (age 28)

Sport
- Sport: Athletics
- Event: Marathon

Achievements and titles
- Personal best(s): Marathon: 2:04:53 (Valencia 2020)
Medal record
World Marathon Majors
Gold medal – first place	2023 Tokyo	Marathon

External videos
- Sprint finish at Tokyo Marathon in 2023

Chalu Deso Gelmisa (born 14 December 1997) is a long-distance runner from Ethiopia. He won the 2022 Paris Marathon and the 2023 Tokyo Marathon.

== Career ==
In 2017, Deso took part in the Route du Vin Half Marathon in Luxembourg, finishing in twelfth place with a time of 1:08:06.

In 2019, Deso placed second in the Castellón Marathon. He finished with a time of 2:13:12, nearly five minutes behind his compatriot Andualem Belay, who won the marathon. Eight months later, Deso won the 2019 Porto Marathon with a finish time of 2:09:08, nearly two minutes ahead of the second-place finisher. He broke away from the other runners about 4 km (2.5 mi) from the finish, and set a personal best by more than three minutes, though he missed breaking the course record by three seconds.

Deso set his personal best at the 2020 Valencia Marathon, which was held during the coronavirus pandemic and restricted to elite athletes. His finish time of 2:04:53 placed him sixth on the list of finishers. Deso returned to Valencia in later years, finishing second in 2021 with a time of 2:05:16. He lost by four seconds in a sprint finish to Kenyan Lawrence Cherono, who passed both Deso and third-place finisher Philemon Kacheran in the last 500 m (1,600 ft) of the race. Deso also ran the 2022 Valencia Marathon, placing sixth with a time of 2:04:56, three seconds slower than his personal record. He ran with the lead pack for most of the race, which was won by Kenyan Kelvin Kiptum in 2:01:53, the fastest debut marathon time ever.

In 2022, Deso won the Paris Marathon with a time of 2:05:07, sprinting to finish just three seconds ahead of compatriot Seifu Tura, who took second place. He ran the Sydney Marathon later that year, taking third place with a time of 2:07:09. That year, all three podium finishers had broken the previous Australian all-comers marathon record of 2:07:50.

Deso won the 2023 Tokyo Marathon with a sprint finish, beating compatriot Mohamed Esa by less than a second. Both Deso and Esa recorded a time of 2:05:22, and were closely followed by Ethiopian Tsegaye Getachew, whose time of 2:05:25 rounded out an Ethiopian podium sweep.
