= M60 at the 2014 European Masters Athletics Championships =

The nineteenth European Masters Athletics Championships were held in Izmir, Turkey, from August 22–31, 2014. The European Masters Athletics Championships serve the division of the sport of athletics for people over 35 years of age, referred to as masters athletics.

== Results ==
=== 100 metres ===
Pos	Athlete	Country	Results
1st place, gold medalist(s)	Steve Peters	Great Britain	12.01
2nd place, silver medalist(s)	Gojko Banjevic	Montenegro	12.27
3rd place, bronze medalist(s)	Reinhard Michelchen	Germany	12.40

=== 200 metres ===
Pos	Athlete	Country	Results
1st place, gold medalist(s)	Steve Peters	Great Britain	24.53
2nd place, silver medalist(s)	Rudolf Koenig	Germany	25.74
3rd place, bronze medalist(s)	Reinhard Michelchen	Germany	25.80

=== 400 metres ===
Pos	Athlete	Country	Results
1st place, gold medalist(s)	Steve Peters	Great Britain	56.72
2nd place, silver medalist(s)	Reinhard Michelchen	Germany	57.54
3rd place, bronze medalist(s)	Drago Nikolic	Slovenia	59.29

=== 800 metres ===
Pos	Athlete	Country	Results
1st place, gold medalist(s)	Joe Gough	Ireland	2:20.89
2nd place, silver medalist(s)	Walter Rentsch	Germany	2:22.35
3rd place, bronze medalist(s)	Yves Levasseur	France	2:25.37

=== 1500 metres ===
Pos	Athlete	Country	Results
1st place, gold medalist(s)	Martien van der Hoorn	Netherlands	4:42.36
2nd place, silver medalist(s)	Walter Rentsch	Germany	4:44.82
3rd place, bronze medalist(s)	Yves Levasseur	France	4:45.72

=== 5000 metres ===
Pos	Athlete	Country	Results
1st place, gold medalist(s)	Martien van der Hoorn	Netherlands	17:40.66
2nd place, silver medalist(s)	Justin Gloden	Luxembourg	17:46.19
3rd place, bronze medalist(s)	Igor Vakin	Russia	18:11.09

=== 10000 metres ===
Pos	Athlete	Country	Results
1st place, gold medalist(s)	Justin Gloden	Luxembourg	38:11.52
2nd place, silver medalist(s)	Oystein Syversen	Norway	38:15.58
3rd place, bronze medalist(s)	Xose Luis Otero	Spain	38:36.42

=== 100 metres hurdles ===
Pos	Athlete	Country	Results
1st place, gold medalist(s)	Wolfgang Ritte	Germany	15.69
2nd place, silver medalist(s)	Jouko Nikula	Finland	16.14
3rd place, bronze medalist(s)	Sylwester Lorenz	Poland	17.43

=== 300 metres hurdles ===
Pos	Athlete	Country	Results
1st place, gold medalist(s)	Drago Nikolic	Slovenia	46.19
2nd place, silver medalist(s)	Vasilios Andreadis	Greece	48.34
3rd place, bronze medalist(s)	Heinz Baseda	Germany	49.83

=== 2000 metres steeplechase ===
Pos	Athlete	Country	Results
1st place, gold medalist(s)	Marten van der Hoorn	Netherlands	6:53.94
2nd place, silver medalist(s)	Henning Steffan Jensen	Denmark	8:02.06
3rd place, bronze medalist(s)	Valeriy Aristov	Russia	8:03.92

=== 4×100 metres relay ===
Pos	Athletes	Country	Results
1st place, gold medalist(s)	Walwyn Franklyn	Great Britain	48.68
1st place, gold medalist(s)	John Browne	Great Britain	48.68
1st place, gold medalist(s)	Simon Barret	Great Britain	48.68
1st place, gold medalist(s)	Steve Peters	Great Britain	48.68
2nd place, silver medalist(s)	Winfried Weires	Germany	51.24
2nd place, silver medalist(s)	Rudolf Koenig	Germany	51.24
2nd place, silver medalist(s)	Reinhard Michelchen	Germany	51.24
2nd place, silver medalist(s)	Winfried Heckner	Germany	51.24
3rd place, bronze medalist(s)	Alexander Kornazhitskiy	Russia	55.37
3rd place, bronze medalist(s)	Evgenii Mikeev	Russia	55.37
3rd place, bronze medalist(s)	Evgeny Pudovnikov	Russia	55.37
3rd place, bronze medalist(s)	Ippolit Lobanov	Russia	55.37

=== 4×400 metres relay ===
Pos	Athletes	Country	Results
1st place, gold medalist(s)	Walwyn Franklyn	Great Britain	4:01.24
1st place, gold medalist(s)	Simon Barrett	Great Britain	4:01.24
1st place, gold medalist(s)	Bob Douglas	Great Britain	4:01.24
1st place, gold medalist(s)	Steve Peters	Great Britain	4:01.24
2nd place, silver medalist(s)	Wolfgang Thate	Germany	4:01.93
2nd place, silver medalist(s)	Rudolf Koenig	Germany	4:01.93
2nd place, silver medalist(s)	Heinz Baseda	Germany	4:01.93
2nd place, silver medalist(s)	Reinhard Michelchen	Germany	4:01.93
3rd place, bronze medalist(s)	Joao Travessa	Portugal	4:32.48
3rd place, bronze medalist(s)	Fernando Bento Baptista	Portugal	4:32.48
3rd place, bronze medalist(s)	Alfredo Mateus	Portugal	4:32.48
3rd place, bronze medalist(s)	Fernando Pestana Teles	Portugal	4:32.48

=== Marathon ===
Pos	Athlete	Country	Results
1st place, gold medalist(s)	Leonid Petrov	Russia	3:18:46
2nd place, silver medalist(s)	Huseyin Polat	Turkey	3:22:07
3rd place, bronze medalist(s)	Boris Bansemer	Germany	3:29:25

=== High jump ===
Pos	Athlete	Country	Results
1st place, gold medalist(s)	Dariusz Bednarski	Poland	1.68
2nd place, silver medalist(s)	Matti Nieminen	Finland	1.65
3rd place, bronze medalist(s)	Jaroslav Lorenc	Czech Republic	1.62

=== Pole vault ===
Pos	Athlete	Country	Results
1st place, gold medalist(s)	Wolfgang Ritte	Germany	4.00
2nd place, silver medalist(s)	Antonin Hadinger	Czech Republic	3.50
3rd place, bronze medalist(s)	Nikolaos Karatasos	Greece	3.10

=== Long jump ===
Pos	Athlete	Country	Results
1st place, gold medalist(s)	Adrian Neagu	Romania	5.65
2nd place, silver medalist(s)	Jouko Nikula	Finland	5.48
3rd place, bronze medalist(s)	Evgeny Pudovnikov	Russia	5.44

=== Triple jump ===
Pos	Athlete	Country	Results
1st place, gold medalist(s)	Alexander Kornazhitskiy	Russia	11.67
2nd place, silver medalist(s)	Evgeny Pudovnikov	Russia	11.58
3rd place, bronze medalist(s)	Temel Erbek	Turkey	11.03

=== Shot put ===
Pos	Athlete	Country	Results
1st place, gold medalist(s)	Vasileios Manganas	Greece	14.33
2nd place, silver medalist(s)	Rauno Mottonen	Finland	13.56
3rd place, bronze medalist(s)	Waclaw Krankowski	Poland	13.56

=== Discus throw ===
Pos	Athlete	Country	Results
1st place, gold medalist(s)	Rauno Mottonen	Finland	48.93
2nd place, silver medalist(s)	Jan Voigt	Germany	46.49
3rd place, bronze medalist(s)	Jorma Liikala	Finland	45.15

=== Hammer throw ===
Pos	Athlete	Country	Results
1st place, gold medalist(s)	Vasileios Manganas	Greece	55.66
2nd place, silver medalist(s)	Mehmedalija Bajric	Bosnia and Herzegovina	53.62
3rd place, bronze medalist(s)	Heikki Kangas	Finland	53.43

=== Javelin throw ===
Pos	Athlete	Country	Results
1st place, gold medalist(s)	Walter Kuehndel	Germany	54.11
2nd place, silver medalist(s)	Teuvo Kemppainen	Finland	50.73
3rd place, bronze medalist(s)	Hannu Kortesluoma	Finland	45.63

=== Weight throw ===
Pos	Athlete	Country	Results
1st place, gold medalist(s)	Heikki Kangas	Finland	19.75
2nd place, silver medalist(s)	Mehmedalija Bajric	Bosnia and Herzegovina	18.41
3rd place, bronze medalist(s)	Vasileios Manganas	Greece	18.26

=== Throws pentathlon ===
Pos	Athlete	Country	Results
1st place, gold medalist(s)	Vasileios Manganas	Greece	4052
2nd place, silver medalist(s)	Anatolii Vlasov	Ukraine	3874
3rd place, bronze medalist(s)	Lembit Talpsepp	Estonia	3778

=== Decathlon ===
Pos	Athlete	Country	Results
1st place, gold medalist(s)	Klaus-Peter Neuendorf	Germany	6725
2nd place, silver medalist(s)	Heinz Baseda	Germany	6550
3rd place, bronze medalist(s)	Sylwester Lorenz	Poland	5943

=== 5000 metre track race walk ===
Pos	Athlete	Country	Results
1st place, gold medalist(s)	Anatolii Shipitsin	Russia	25:48.60
2nd place, silver medalist(s)	Fabio Ruzzier	Slovenia	27:55.34
3rd place, bronze medalist(s)	Alfons Schwarz	Germany	28:45.34

=== 20000 metre road race walk ===
Pos	Athlete	Country	Results
1st place, gold medalist(s)	Anatolii Shipitsin	Russia	1:48:30
2nd place, silver medalist(s)	Fabio Ruzzier	Slovenia	2:05:38
3rd place, bronze medalist(s)	Alfons Schwarz	Germany	2:11:01
