= 2023 Tokyo Marathon =

42.195 km (26.2 mi) race in Japan

16th Tokyo Marathon
- Location: Tokyo, Japan
- Dates: 5 March 2023

Champions
- Men: Deso Gelmisa (2:05:22)
- Women: Rosemary Wanjiru (2:16:28)
- Wheelchair men: Marcel Hug (1:20:57)
- Wheelchair women: Manuela Schär (1:36:43)

The 2023 Tokyo Marathon was the 16th edition of the annual marathon race in Tokyo, held on Sunday, 5 March 2023. A Platinum Label marathon, it was the first of six annual World Marathon Majors events to be held in 2023, and the only one of the six that did not announce the inclusion of a non-binary division for the year. The field for the marathon was limited to 37,500 runners.

== Results ==
=== Men ===
Elite men's top 10 finishers
Position	Athlete	Nationality	Time
1st place, gold medalist(s)	Deso Gelmisa	Ethiopia	02:05:22
2nd place, silver medalist(s)	Mohamed Esa	Ethiopia	02:05:22
3rd place, bronze medalist(s)	Tsegaye Getachew	Ethiopia	02:05:25
4	Titus Kipruto	Kenya	02:05:32
5	Cameron Levins	Canada	02:05:36
6	Tadu Abate	Ethiopia	02:05:38
7	Ichitaka Yamashita	Japan	02:05:51
8	Kenya Sonota	Japan	02:05:59
9	Suguru Osako	Japan	02:06:13
10	Hiroto Inoue	Japan	02:07:09

=== Women ===
Elite women's top 10 finishers
Position	Athlete	Nationality	Time
1st place, gold medalist(s)	Rosemary Wanjiru	Kenya	02:16:28
2nd place, silver medalist(s)	Tsehay Gemechu	Ethiopia	02:16:56
3rd place, bronze medalist(s)	Ashete Bekere	Ethiopia	02:19:11
4	Workenesh Edesa	Ethiopia	02:20:13
5	Betsy Saina	United States	02:21:40
6	Mizuki Matsuda	Japan	02:21:44
7	Ai Hosoda	Japan	02:22:08
8	Lindsay Flanagan	United States	02:26:08
9	Kaori Morita	Japan	02:26:31
10	Yukari Abe	Japan	02:28:20
