= Steve Peters (psychiatrist) =

English psychiatrist (born 1953)

Medal record

Athletics

Representing United Kingdom

World Masters Athletics Championships (M50)
| Gold medal – first place | 2005 San Sebastian | 100 m |
| Gold medal – first place | 2005 San Sebastian | 200 m |
| Gold medal – first place | 2005 San Sebastian | 400 m |
| Gold medal – first place | 2007 Riccione | 200 m |
| Silver medal – second place | 2007 Riccione | 100 m |
| Bronze medal – third place | 2007 Riccione | 400 m |

World Masters Athletics Championships (M55)
| Gold medal – first place | 2009 Lahti | 200 m |
| Gold medal – first place | 2009 Lahti | 400 m |

World Masters Athletics Championships (M60)
| Gold medal – first place | 2013 Porto Alegre | 100 m |
| Gold medal – first place | 2013 Porto Alegre | 200 m |
| Gold medal – first place | 2013 Porto Alegre | 400 m |
| Gold medal – first place | 2015 Lyon | 100 m |
| Gold medal – first place | 2015 Lyon | 200 m |
| Gold medal – first place | 2015 Lyon | 400 m |

European Masters Athletics Championships (M50)
| Gold medal – first place | 2006 Poznan | 100m |
| Gold medal – first place | 2006 Poznan | 200m |
| Gold medal – first place | 2006 Poznan | 400m |

European Masters Athletics Championships (M55)
| Gold medal – first place | 2010 Nyiregyhaza | 100m |
| Gold medal – first place | 2010 Nyiregyhaza | 200m |
| Gold medal – first place | 2010 Nyiregyhaza | 400m |
| Gold medal – first place | 2011 Gent | 200m |

European Masters Athletics Championships (M60)
| Gold medal – first place | 2014 Izmir | 100m |
| Gold medal – first place | 2014 Izmir | 200m |
| Gold medal – first place | 2014 Izmir | 400m |

European Masters Indoor Athletics Championships (M50)
| Gold medal – first place | 2007 Helsinki | 60m |
| Gold medal – first place | 2007 Helsinki | 200m |
| Gold medal – first place | 2007 Helsinki | 400m |

European Masters Indoor Athletics Championships (M55)
| Gold medal – first place | 2009 Ancona | 200m |
| Gold medal – first place | 2009 Ancona | 400m |
| Silver medal – second place | 2009 Ancona | 60m |

Stephen Peters (born 5 July 1953) is an English psychiatrist who works in elite sport. He is best known for his work with British Cycling. He has published four books, A Path Through the Jungle in 2021, The Chimp Paradox in 2012, My Hidden Chimp in 2018 and The Silent Guides in 2018.

== Early life ==
Peters was born in Middlesbrough. His father worked on Tees Dock as a stevedore and his mother worked as an insurance agent. He was the middle child of three boys. He attended grammar school, having passed the scholarship entrance exams. He was not academically inclined and by self-admission would pass each academic hurdle throughout his entire career by achieving only what was necessary. He achieved eight ordinary levels and then took four Advanced level subjects in mathematics, physics, chemistry and biology, the first pupil at his school to take four 'A' level subjects.

After leaving school he went to Stirling University to study mathematics and then went on to take a Post Graduate Certificate of Education at Sheffield University, where he gained a distinction in teaching practice. He taught mathematics for several years in secondary schools and colleges.

He ran for Holbeach AC throughout the whole of the 1980s, and 1990s and early 2000s. At Boston High School, deputy head Beryl Clay had persuaded him to take up athletics at Holbeach. He had a car accident on the A1, and damaged his knee cap in late April 1988. In August 1991 he took part in the World Medical Championships in Crete, and in Italy in July 1992.

During his teaching career he undertook extensive voluntary work that spanned across organisations such as 'Help the Aged', the NSPCC (working with educationally and socially disadvantaged children), the RSPCA and he also took classes at North Sea Camp for young offenders alongside work in the probation service. Peters' interest in the support for victims of crime led him to help start a victim support scheme in his town of Boston. This movement spread and resulted in the National Victims Support Scheme.

Peters re-entered University to study medicine at St Mary's Medical School, part of the University of London. During his time as an undergraduate, he was the year representative in his first year, the secretary of the students' union in his second year and became president in his third year. He won the prize for medical statistics. Whilst at St Mary's he also directed the medical school opera and became the president of London University Athletics. He represented London University at the British University Championships, where he made the final in the 200 metres. Peters was awarded colours for outstanding service to the University of London.

== Work ==
=== Medical and academic career ===
After graduating as a doctor, he undertook several positions within hospitals and institutions across the UK in disciplines of surgery, medicine, general practice and various branches of psychiatry. He gained his membership exams for the Royal College of Psychiatrists and became a consultant psychiatrist within the National Health Service, where he worked for twenty years. During this time he was clinical director of Bassetlaw District General Hospital and worked at the Special Hospital at Rampton working with patients with personality disorders.

In parallel to his hospital clinical work, he worked at Sheffield University as a senior clinical lecturer in medicine, where he became undergraduate dean and professor of psychiatry (positions which he still currently holds as of 2015).

During his time at the university, he gained a master's degree in medical education, a post-graduate diploma in sports medicine and was awarded a doctorate in medicine. Peters set a precedent by being bestowed the Senate award for teaching excellence on two occasions, still a unique achievement, and represented the university at a meeting to celebrate teaching excellence at Downing Street. Peters set up the mentoring system for student support within the medical school and led on this for several years.

=== Work in elite sport ===
In 2001 a former student at Sheffield recommended Peters to the British Cycling team, and he moved from part-time to full-time work with the team in 2005. Peters has been recognised by Olympic cyclists Sir Chris Hoy and Victoria Pendleton as having helped them in their careers. Sir Dave Brailsford has described Peters as "the best appointment I've ever made." Peters stepped down from his role with British Cycling in April 2014 when Brailsford left his position as Performance Director.

Peters has worked with Ronnie O'Sullivan since 2011, working with him when he won his 4th and 5th World Snooker Championships in 2012 and 2013. O'Sullivan has acknowledged Peters' influence and help in his continued success.

After the 2012 Olympics Peters was appointed by UK Athletics to work with the country's high performance athletes. Sprinter Adam Gemili, who won gold at the 2014 European Athletics Championships in the 200 metres and silver at the 2014 Commonwealth Games in the 100 metres, attributed his ability to perform under pressure at major championships to his work with Peters.

In November 2012 Peters started to work with Liverpool F.C. In March 2014 he was recruited to help the England football team.

== Books ==
=== The Chimp Paradox (2012) ===
Peters' first book, The Chimp Paradox, was published in January 2012 and has since gone on to sell 615,000 copies in the UK (as of 31 March 2019). In the book Peters uses his 'Chimp Model' to depict the irrational, emotional areas of the brain as a chimp and the logical areas as a human.

=== My Hidden Chimp (2018) ===
Released in November 2018, My Hidden Chimp is an educational children's book written to help children understand and manage their emotions. It has sold more than 50,000 copies (as of 24 February 2019).

=== The Silent Guides (2018) ===
Released in November 2018 as a companion book to My Hidden Chimp, the book is aimed at adults, to help them understand their own mind and to support their children reading My Hidden Chimp.

=== A Path through the Jungle (2021) ===
A Path through the Jungle is a structured, practical self-development programme to help the reader attain psychological health and wellbeing. Professor Peters explains complex neuroscience in straightforward terms with his Chimp Management Mind Model.

== Chimp Management ==
Peters established Chimp Management Ltd, a company which delivers consultancy and training services. He presents a video programme every two weeks on The Troop, a membership platform set up by Chimp Management Ltd.

== Athletics career ==
Peters competes in masters athletics and has held multiple World Masters Champion titles and world records over the 100, 200 and 400 metres. He currently competes in the M70 age group.

== See also ==
- Sports psychology
