= Riyadh Marathon =

Annual race in Saudi Arabia since 2022

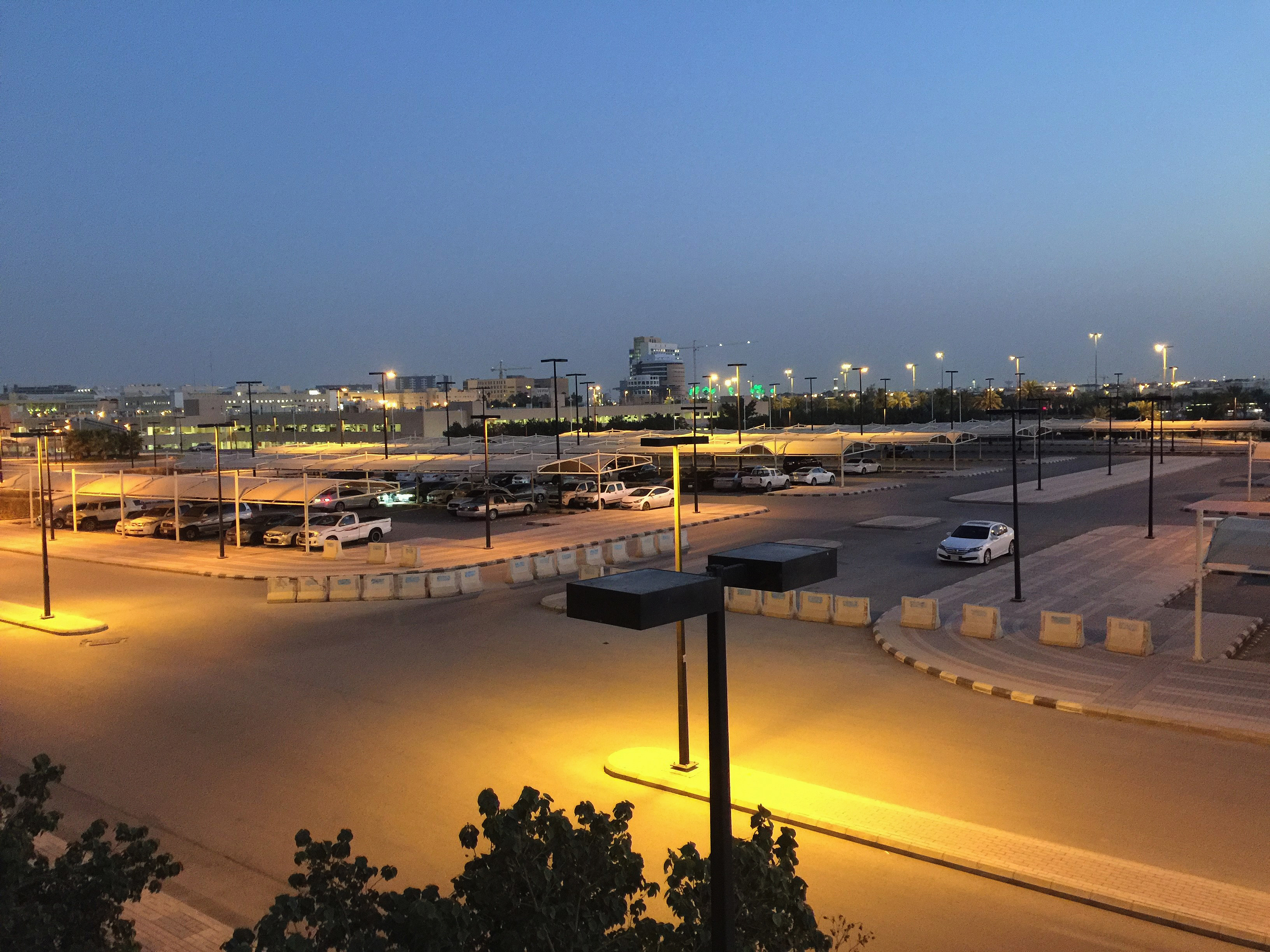
- The parking lot of the College of Law and Political Science at King Saud University, which marathoners pass near the race's end
- Date: February or March
- Location: Riyadh, Saudi Arabia
- Event type: Road
- Distance: Marathon, half marathon, 10K, 4K
- Established: 2022 (4 years ago)
- Website: Official website
- Participants: 392 finishers (2022)

The Riyadh Marathon is an annual road-based marathon hosted by Riyadh, Saudi Arabia, since 2022. The organizers state that is the "first official full marathon to be held in the Kingdom". The marathon has been a World Athletics Elite Label Road Race since its inaugural race. During the race weekend, a half marathon, a 10K race, and a 4K race are also offered.

== History ==
A half marathon had been held in Saudi Arabia in 2018.

The inaugural marathon race was held on 5 March 2022. More than 10,000 people took part in the event.

== Course ==
All the races start and finish Princess Nourah University. The marathon is run on a loop course, although the start and finish lines are a few hundred metres (yards) apart. The loop is roughly a half marathon in length, and marathoners run the loop twice.

== Winners ==
Key: Course record

Edition	Year	Men's winner	Time (min:sec)	Women's winner	Time (h:m:s)
1st	2022	Tsegaye Getachew (ETH)	2:06:27	Tadu Teshome (ETH)	2:26:38
2nd	2023	Samir Jouaher (MAR)	2:08:42	Meseret Abebayahau (ETH)	2:24:30
3rd	2024	Wilfred Kigen (KEN)	2:08:39	Bedatu Hirpa (ETH)	2:27:20
4th	2025	Abe Gashahun (ETH)	2:08:35	Netsanet Gudeta (ETH)	2:27:24
