= M65 at the 2014 European Masters Athletics Championships =

The nineteenth European Masters Athletics Championships were held in İzmir, Turkey, from August 22–31, 2014. The European Masters Athletics Championships serve the division of the sport of athletics for people over 35 years of age, referred to as masters athletics.

== Results ==
=== 100 metres ===
Pos	Athlete	Country	Results
1st place, gold medalist(s)	Vincenzo Barisciano	Italy	13.01
2nd place, silver medalist(s)	Vladimir Vybostok	Slovakia	13.32
3rd place, bronze medalist(s)	Debonnaire Daniel	France	13.40

=== 200 metres ===
Pos	Athlete	Country	Results
1st place, gold medalist(s)	Rudolf Frei	Italy	26.87
2nd place, silver medalist(s)	Hans-Juergen Fruehauf	Germany	27.59
3rd place, bronze medalist(s)	Paul Anthony	Great Britain	27.64

=== 400 metres ===
Pos	Athlete	Country	Results
1st place, gold medalist(s)	Rudolf Frei	Italy	59.21
2nd place, silver medalist(s)	Hans-Juergen Fruehauf	Germany	1:00.72
3rd place, bronze medalist(s)	Paul Anthony	Great Britain	1:02.78

=== 800 metres ===
Pos	Athlete	Country	Results
1st place, gold medalist(s)	Bruce Hendrie	Great Britain	2:36.63
2nd place, silver medalist(s)	Ahti Finning	Finland	2:37.13
3rd place, bronze medalist(s)	Thomas Partzsch	Germany	2:38.28

=== 1500 metres ===
Pos	Athlete	Country	Results
1st place, gold medalist(s)	Alfred Hermes	Germany	5:20.45
2nd place, silver medalist(s)	Aleksei Gavrilov	Russia	5:24.97
3rd place, bronze medalist(s)	Viktor Soloviov	Ukraine	5:31.38

=== 5000 metres ===
Pos	Athlete	Country	Results
1st place, gold medalist(s)	Steran Lytkin	Russia	19:11.02
2nd place, silver medalist(s)	Vladimir Sporykhin	Russia	19:47.00
3rd place, bronze medalist(s)	Aleksei Gavrilov	Russia	19:58.47

=== 10000 metres ===
Pos	Athlete	Country	Results
1st place, gold medalist(s)	Steran Lytkin	Russia	40:26.38
2nd place, silver medalist(s)	Vladimir Sporykhin	Russia	41:54.05
3rd place, bronze medalist(s)	Alexey Dolgikh	Russia	42:08.97

=== 100 metres hurdles ===
Pos	Athlete	Country	Results
1st place, gold medalist(s)	Dieter Langenbach	Germany	16.40
2nd place, silver medalist(s)	Antonio Montaruli	Italy	18.16
3rd place, bronze medalist(s)	Mehmet Murat Kacar	Turkey	18.33

=== 300 metres hurdles ===
Pos	Athlete	Country	Results
1st place, gold medalist(s)	Hans-Juergen Fruehauf	Germany	49.24
2nd place, silver medalist(s)	Antonio Montaruli	Italy	50.03
3rd place, bronze medalist(s)	Thomas Partzsch	Germany	51.31

=== 2000 metres steeplechase ===
Pos	Athlete	Country	Results
1st place, gold medalist(s)	Martin McEvilly	Ireland	7:49.25
2nd place, silver medalist(s)	Rais Khabibullin	Russia	9:13.39
3rd place, bronze medalist(s)	Thomas Partzsch	Germany	10:01.96

=== 4×100 metres relay ===
Pos	Athletes	Country	Results
1st place, gold medalist(s)	Esko Huttunen	Finland	55.85
1st place, gold medalist(s)	Ahti Finning	Finland	55.85
1st place, gold medalist(s)	Lasse Kyro	Finland	55.85
1st place, gold medalist(s)	Markku Penttila	Finland	55.85
2nd place, silver medalist(s)	Guenter Hartung	Germany	56.49
2nd place, silver medalist(s)	Hans-Juergen Fruehauf	Germany	56.49
2nd place, silver medalist(s)	Thomas Partzsch	Germany	56.49
2nd place, silver medalist(s)	Dieter Langenbach	Germany	56.49
3rd place, bronze medalist(s)	Oleg Neumolotov	Russia	56.66
3rd place, bronze medalist(s)	Valentin Stabrovskiy	Russia	56.66
3rd place, bronze medalist(s)	Leonid Kryazhkov	Russia	56.66
3rd place, bronze medalist(s)	Victor Melnikov	Russia	56.66

=== 4×400 metres relay ===
Pos	Athletes	Country	Results
1st place, gold medalist(s)	Guenter Hartung	Germany	4:30.58
1st place, gold medalist(s)	Thomas Partzsch	Germany	4:30.58
1st place, gold medalist(s)	Alfred Hermes	Germany	4:30.58
1st place, gold medalist(s)	Hans-Juergen Fruehauf	Germany	4:30.58
2nd place, silver medalist(s)	Rais Khabibullin	Russia	4:31.97
2nd place, silver medalist(s)	Oleg Neumolotov	Russia	4:31.97
2nd place, silver medalist(s)	Aleksei Gavrilov	Russia	4:31.97
2nd place, silver medalist(s)	Victor Melnikov	Russia	4:31.97

=== Marathon ===
Pos	Athlete	Country	Results
1st place, gold medalist(s)	Urpo Naumanen	Finland	3:13:25
2nd place, silver medalist(s)	Steran Lytkin	Russia	3:18:17
3rd place, bronze medalist(s)	William Willmitt	Great Britain	3:53:17

=== High jump ===
Pos	Athlete	Country	Results
1st place, gold medalist(s)	Dusan Prezelj	Slovenia	1.67 WR
2nd place, silver medalist(s)	Valdis Cela	Latvia	1.48
3rd place, bronze medalist(s)	Jorma Lipasti	Finland	1.48

=== Pole vault ===
Pos	Athlete	Country	Results
1st place, gold medalist(s)	Jorma Lipasti	Finland	3.10
2nd place, silver medalist(s)	Valdis Cela	Latvia	3.00
3rd place, bronze medalist(s)	Verner Friberg	Estonia	2.70

=== Long jump ===
Pos	Athlete	Country	Results
1st place, gold medalist(s)	Joao Travessa	Portugal	5.03
2nd place, silver medalist(s)	Giuliano Costantini	Italy	5.00
3rd place, bronze medalist(s)	Vladimir Vybostok	Russia	4.66

=== Triple jump ===
Pos	Athlete	Country	Results
1st place, gold medalist(s)	Giuliano Constantini	Italy	11.12
2nd place, silver medalist(s)	Leonid Kryazhkov	Russia	11.06
3rd place, bronze medalist(s)	Valentin Stabrovskiy	Russia	10.96

=== Shot put ===
Pos	Athlete	Country	Results
1st place, gold medalist(s)	Arild Busterud	Norway	14.32
2nd place, silver medalist(s)	Arvo Nurm	Estonia	13.39
3rd place, bronze medalist(s)	Stanislav Kukota	Ukraine	13.38

=== Discus throw ===
Pos	Athlete	Country	Results
1st place, gold medalist(s)	Arild Busterud	Norway	48.32
2nd place, silver medalist(s)	Milos Gryc	Czech Republic	46.78
3rd place, bronze medalist(s)	Tadeusz Laska	Poland	46.65

=== Hammer throw ===
Pos	Athlete	Country	Results
1st place, gold medalist(s)	Arild Busterud	Norway	53.73
2nd place, silver medalist(s)	Antti Orn	Finland	45.52
3rd place, bronze medalist(s)	Finn Malchau	Denmark	40.25

=== Javelin throw ===
Pos	Athlete	Country	Results
1st place, gold medalist(s)	Helmut Hessert	Germany	44.46
2nd place, silver medalist(s)	Juergen Dannenberg	Germany	42.36
3rd place, bronze medalist(s)	Rais Khabibullin	Russia	41.31

=== Weight throw ===
Pos	Athlete	Country	Results
1st place, gold medalist(s)	Arild Busterud	Norway	19.31
2nd place, silver medalist(s)	Milos Gryc	Czech Republic	16.34
3rd place, bronze medalist(s)	Arvo Nurm	Estonia	15.75

=== Throws pentathlon ===
Pos	Athlete	Country	Results
1st place, gold medalist(s)	Arvo Nurm	Estonia	4215
2nd place, silver medalist(s)	Milos Gryc	Czech Republic	3930
3rd place, bronze medalist(s)	Thomas Farragher	Ireland	3542

=== Decathlon ===
Pos	Athlete	Country	Results
1st place, gold medalist(s)	Valdis Cela	Latvia	6965
2nd place, silver medalist(s)	Rais Khabibullin	Russia	6045
3rd place, bronze medalist(s)	Lasse Kyro	Finland	6010

=== 5000 metre track race walk ===
Pos	Athlete	Country	Results
1st place, gold medalist(s)	Ian Richards	Great Britain	24:44.06
2nd place, silver medalist(s)	Roger Michell	Great Britain	28:13.87
3rd place, bronze medalist(s)	Peter Boszko	Great Britain	28:21.68

=== 20000 metre road race walk ===
Pos	Athlete	Country	Results
1st place, gold medalist(s)	Ian Richards	Great Britain	1:55:36
2nd place, silver medalist(s)	Roby Ponzio	Switzerland	2:11:10
3rd place, bronze medalist(s)	Roger Michell	Great Britain	2:14:02
