= M80 at the 2014 European Masters Athletics Championships =

The nineteenth European Masters Athletics Championships were held in Izmir, Turkey, from August 22–31, 2014. The European Masters Athletics Championships serve the division of the sport of athletics for people over 35 years of age, referred to as masters athletics.

== Results ==
=== 100 metres ===
Pos	Athlete	Country	Results
1st place, gold medalist(s)	Armando Roca	Spain	15.15
2nd place, silver medalist(s)	Kosmas Kapasakalis	Greece	16.21
3rd place, bronze medalist(s)	Josef Zecha	Germany	16.38

=== 200 metres ===
Pos	Athlete	Country	Results
1st place, gold medalist(s)	Anatoly Zorin	Russia	32.05
2nd place, silver medalist(s)	Kosmas Kapasakalis	Greece	33.34
3rd place, bronze medalist(s)	Herbert E. Mueller	Germany	34.81

=== 400 metres ===
Pos	Athlete	Country	Results
1st place, gold medalist(s)	Kosmas Kapasakalis	Greece	1:21.79
2nd place, silver medalist(s)	Herbert E. Mueller	Germany	1:21.90
3rd place, bronze medalist(s)	Ivan Viuzhanin	Russia	1:23.08

=== 800 metres ===
Pos	Athlete	Country	Results
1st place, gold medalist(s)	Francisco Vicente	Portugal	3:25.22
2nd place, silver medalist(s)	Christian Vetsch	Switzerland	3:54.01

=== 1500 metres ===
Pos	Athlete	Country	Results
1st place, gold medalist(s)	Vladimir Khripunov	Russia	6:56.48
2nd place, silver medalist(s)	Francisco Vicente	Portugal	6:59.06
3rd place, bronze medalist(s)	Christian Vetsch	Switzerland	7:15.24

=== 5000 metres ===
Pos	Athlete	Country	Results
1st place, gold medalist(s)	Vladimir Khripunov	Russia	24:07.33
2nd place, silver medalist(s)	Francisco Vicente	Portugal	25:49.97
3rd place, bronze medalist(s)	Christian Vetsch	Switzerland	27:10.04

=== 10000 metres ===
Pos	Athlete	Country	Results
1st place, gold medalist(s)	Vladimir Khripunov	Russia	52:09.00
2nd place, silver medalist(s)	Christian Vetsch	Switzerland	52:21.26
3rd place, bronze medalist(s)	Mikhail Solovev	Russia	1:01:34.51

=== 80 metres hurdles ===
Pos	Athlete	Country	Results
1st place, gold medalist(s)	Symeon Symeonidis	Greece	18.18
2nd place, silver medalist(s)	Hikmet Kandeydi	Turkey	19.12
3rd place, bronze medalist(s)	Victor Klypin	Russia	19.66

=== 200 metres hurdles ===
Pos	Athlete	Country	Results
1st place, gold medalist(s)	Francisco Vicente	Portugal	45.62
2nd place, silver medalist(s)	Nurettin Sabuncu	Turkey	47.87
3rd place, bronze medalist(s)	Hikmet Kandeydi	Turkey	48.02

=== 2000 metres steeplechase ===
Pos	Athlete	Country	Results
1st place, gold medalist(s)	Francisco Vicente	Portugal	11:12.00

=== 4×100 metres relay ===
Pos	Athletes	Country	Results
1st place, gold medalist(s)	Josef Zecha	Germany	1:09.03
1st place, gold medalist(s)	Manfred Konopka	Germany	1:09.03
1st place, gold medalist(s)	Felix Hoppe	Germany	1:09.03
1st place, gold medalist(s)	Herbert E. Mueller	Germany	1:09.03

=== Marathon ===
Pos	Athlete	Country	Results
1st place, gold medalist(s)	Vladimir Khripunov	Russia	4:58:20
2nd place, silver medalist(s)	Stylianos Prassas	Greece	5:38:38

=== High jump ===
Pos	Athlete	Country	Results
1st place, gold medalist(s)	Henry Andersen	Denmark	1.25
2nd place, silver medalist(s)	Hikmet Kandeydi	Turkey	1.14
3rd place, bronze medalist(s)	Nurettin Sabuncu	Turkey	1.02

=== Pole vault ===
Pos	Athlete	Country	Results
1st place, gold medalist(s)	Symeon Symeonidis	Greece	2.40
2nd place, silver medalist(s)	Manfred Konopka	Germany	1.90
2nd place, silver medalist(s)	Hikmet Kandeydi	Turkey	1.90

=== Long jump ===
Pos	Athlete	Country	Results
1st place, gold medalist(s)	Antti Kanerva	Finland	3.67
2nd place, silver medalist(s)	Symeon Symeonidis	Greece	3.43
3rd place, bronze medalist(s)	Heinrich Amort	Italy	3.09

=== Triple jump ===
Pos	Athlete	Country	Results
1st place, gold medalist(s)	Henry Andersen	Denmark	8.00
2nd place, silver medalist(s)	Antti Kanerva	Finland	7.85
3rd place, bronze medalist(s)	Symeon Symeonidis	Greece	7.60

=== Shot put ===
Pos	Athlete	Country	Results
1st place, gold medalist(s)	Anton Laus	Estonia	11.06
2nd place, silver medalist(s)	Esa Vuorinen	Finland	10.31
3rd place, bronze medalist(s)	Victor Klypin	Russia	9.55

=== Discus throw ===
Pos	Athlete	Country	Results
1st place, gold medalist(s)	Antanas Cerniauskas	Lithuania	29.23
2nd place, silver medalist(s)	Anton Laus	Estonia	28.58
3rd place, bronze medalist(s)	Arnost Boldan	Czech Republic	27.82

=== Hammer throw ===
Pos	Athlete	Country	Results
1st place, gold medalist(s)	Antanas Cerniauskas	Lithuania	39.25
2nd place, silver medalist(s)	Arnost Boldan	Czech Republic	36.51
3rd place, bronze medalist(s)	Henryk Plukarz	Sweden	34.38

=== Javelin throw ===
Pos	Athlete	Country	Results
1st place, gold medalist(s)	Antanas Cerniauskas	Lithuania	33.48
2nd place, silver medalist(s)	Victor Klypin	Russia	27.26
3rd place, bronze medalist(s)	Matti Halme	Finland	24.76

=== Weight throw ===
Pos	Athlete	Country	Results
1st place, gold medalist(s)	Henryk Plukarz	Sweden	15.74
2nd place, silver medalist(s)	Antanas Cerniauskas	Lithuania	13.79
3rd place, bronze medalist(s)	Anton Laus	Estonia	13.10

=== Throws pentathlon ===
Pos	Athlete	Country	Results
1st place, gold medalist(s)	Antanas Cerniauskas	Lithuania	4260
2nd place, silver medalist(s)	Arnost Boldan	Czech Republic	3778
3rd place, bronze medalist(s)	Anton Laus	Estonia	3762

=== Decathlon ===
Pos	Athlete	Country	Results
1st place, gold medalist(s)	Nurettin Sabuncu	Turkey	3024

=== 5000 metre track race walk ===
Pos	Athlete	Country	Results
1st place, gold medalist(s)	Ivan Pushkin	Ukraine	35:26.64
2nd place, silver medalist(s)	Jose Bom	Portugal	47:38.37

=== 20000 metre road race walk ===
Pos	Athlete	Country	Results
1st place, gold medalist(s)	Ivan Pushkin	Ukraine	2:34:11
