= M45 at the 2014 European Masters Athletics Championships =

The nineteenth European Masters Athletics Championships were held in Izmir, Turkey, from August 22–31, 2014. The European Masters Athletics Championships serve the division of the sport of athletics for people over 35 years of age, referred to as masters athletics.

== Results ==
=== 100 metres ===
Pos	Athlete	Country	Results
1st place, gold medalist(s)	Bernd Schauwecker	Germany	11.50
2nd place, silver medalist(s)	Will Macgee	Great Britain	11.57
3rd place, bronze medalist(s)	Dionisis Argiropoulos	Greece	11.84

=== 200 metres ===
Pos	Athlete	Country	Results
1st place, gold medalist(s)	Bernd Schauwecker	Germany	22.80
2nd place, silver medalist(s)	Henk van Dijk	Netherlands	23.33
3rd place, bronze medalist(s)	Roberto Barontini	Italy	23.73

=== 400 metres ===
Pos	Athlete	Country	Results
1st place, gold medalist(s)	Henk van Dijk	Netherlands	51.97
2nd place, silver medalist(s)	Robin Rich	Denmark	53.15
3rd place, bronze medalist(s)	Peter Benedickter	Great Britain	54.11

=== 800 metres ===
Pos	Athlete	Country	Results
1st place, gold medalist(s)	Ugo Piccioli Cappelli	Italy	2:02.05
2nd place, silver medalist(s)	Joaquin Rosello	Spain	2:02.83
3rd place, bronze medalist(s)	Robert Cepek	Czech Republic	2:03.87

=== 1500 metres ===
Pos	Athlete	Country	Results
1st place, gold medalist(s)	Milan Serafin	Czech Republic	4:18.34
2nd place, silver medalist(s)	Koen Joosse	Netherlands	4:19.40
3rd place, bronze medalist(s)	Ugo Piccioli Cappelli	Italy	4:20.26

=== 5000 metres ===
Pos	Athlete	Country	Results
1st place, gold medalist(s)	Manuel Ferreira	Portugal	15:49.96
2nd place, silver medalist(s)	Valerio Brignone	Italy	15:59.67
3rd place, bronze medalist(s)	Rinat Avzelitdinov	Russia	17:33.63

=== 10000 metres ===
Pos	Athlete	Country	Results
1st place, gold medalist(s)	Manuel Ferreira	Portugal	33:48.65
2nd place, silver medalist(s)	Valerio Brignone	Italy	34:40.00
3rd place, bronze medalist(s)	Gerardo Selce	Italy	36:02.28

=== 110 metres hurdles ===
Pos	Athlete	Country	Results
1st place, gold medalist(s)	Slaven Zimbrek	Croatia	16.11
2nd place, silver medalist(s)	Donato Ramirez	Spain	18.26
3rd place, bronze medalist(s)	Vladimir Trushnikov	Russia	22.53

=== 400 metres hurdles ===
Pos	Athlete	Country	Results
1st place, gold medalist(s)	Peter Benedickter	Great Britain	58.77
2nd place, silver medalist(s)	Donato Ramirez	Spain	59.33
3rd place, bronze medalist(s)	Sante Galassi	Italy	59.39

=== 3000 metres steeplechase ===
Pos	Athlete	Country	Results
1st place, gold medalist(s)	Juan Prieto	Spain	10:34.49
2nd place, silver medalist(s)	Rinat Avzelitdinov	Russia	10:41.19
3rd place, bronze medalist(s)	Memet Mustafa Buldum	Turkey	10:44.61

=== 4×100 metres relay ===
Pos	Athletes	Country	Results
1st place, gold medalist(s)	Martin Baranzke	Germany	46.41
1st place, gold medalist(s)	Bernd Schauwecker	Germany	46.41
1st place, gold medalist(s)	Andreas Contag	Germany	46.41
1st place, gold medalist(s)	Roland Groeger	Germany	46.41
2nd place, silver medalist(s)	Antonio Nencini	Italy	47.15
2nd place, silver medalist(s)	Roberto Barontini	Italy	47.15
2nd place, silver medalist(s)	Alberto Zanelli	Italy	47.15
2nd place, silver medalist(s)	Paolo Bertaccini	Italy	47.15
3rd place, bronze medalist(s)	Keith Newton	Great Britain	47.43
3rd place, bronze medalist(s)	Donald Brown	Great Britain	47.43
3rd place, bronze medalist(s)	Michael Olu Osunsami	Great Britain	47.43
3rd place, bronze medalist(s)	Leeroy Golding	Great Britain	47.43

=== 4×400 metres relay ===
Pos	Athletes	Country	Results
1st place, gold medalist(s)	Alberto Zanelli	Italy	3:40.70
1st place, gold medalist(s)	Ugo Piccioli Cappelli	Italy	3:40.70
1st place, gold medalist(s)	Roberto Barontini	Italy	3:40.70
1st place, gold medalist(s)	Paolo Bertaccini	Italy	3:40.70
2nd place, silver medalist(s)	Andreas Contag	Germany	3:44.51
2nd place, silver medalist(s)	Roland Groeger	Germany	3:44.51
2nd place, silver medalist(s)	Karsten Vinzelberg	Germany	3:44.51
2nd place, silver medalist(s)	Bernd Schauwecker	Germany	3:44.51
3rd place, bronze medalist(s)	Michael Olu Osunsami	Great Britain	3:54.18
3rd place, bronze medalist(s)	Donald Brown	Great Britain	3:54.18
3rd place, bronze medalist(s)	Eddie Mckenzie	Great Britain	3:54.18
3rd place, bronze medalist(s)	Leeroy Golding	Great Britain	3:54.18

=== Marathon ===
Pos	Athlete	Country	Results
1st place, gold medalist(s)	Ioan Pavel Moisa	Romania	2:50:09
2nd place, silver medalist(s)	Selami Celik	Turkey	3:03:35
3rd place, bronze medalist(s)	Javier Polo	Spain	3:17:19

=== High jump ===
Pos	Athlete	Country	Results
1st place, gold medalist(s)	Oleg Kramar	Ukraine	1.87
2nd place, silver medalist(s)	Vitalii Romanovich	Russia	1.84
3rd place, bronze medalist(s)	Oleg Korotchenko	Ukraine	1.84

=== Pole vault ===
Pos	Athlete	Country	Results
1st place, gold medalist(s)	David Gordon	Great Britain	3.80
2nd place, silver medalist(s)	Jiri Burda	Czech Republic	3.70
3rd place, bronze medalist(s)	Jozef Vasina	Slovakia	3.60

=== Long jump ===
Pos	Athlete	Country	Results
1st place, gold medalist(s)	Evgeniy Ivanov	Russia	6.41
2nd place, silver medalist(s)	Vladimir Pankratov	Russia	6.31
3rd place, bronze medalist(s)	Philippe Poulain	Belgium	5.87

=== Triple jump ===
Pos	Athlete	Country	Results
1st place, gold medalist(s)	Dmitry Byzov	Russia	14.61
2nd place, silver medalist(s)	Vladimir Pankratov	Russia	13.72
3rd place, bronze medalist(s)	Vasiliy Sokov	Russia	12.70

=== Shot put ===
Pos	Athlete	Country	Results
1st place, gold medalist(s)	John Nicholls	Great Britain	14.27
2nd place, silver medalist(s)	Helmut Maryniak	Germany	13.39
3rd place, bronze medalist(s)	Rysardas Malachovskis	Lithuania	12.47

=== Discus throw ===
Pos	Athlete	Country	Results
1st place, gold medalist(s)	Helmut Maryniak	Germany	47.54
2nd place, silver medalist(s)	Pavel Penaz	Czech Republic	46.86
3rd place, bronze medalist(s)	Alejandro Irache	Spain	39.62

=== Hammer throw ===
Pos	Athlete	Country	Results
1st place, gold medalist(s)	Zoltán Fábián	Hungary	57.30
2nd place, silver medalist(s)	Nikolaos Gentekos	Greece	52.87
3rd place, bronze medalist(s)	Pavel Penaz	Czech Republic	48.45

=== Javelin throw ===
Pos	Athlete	Country	Results
1st place, gold medalist(s)	Grzegorz Pawelski	Poland	55.88
2nd place, silver medalist(s)	Bengt Rilegard	Sweden	54.64
3rd place, bronze medalist(s)	Timo Tikka	Finland	50.97

=== Weight throw ===
Pos	Athlete	Country	Results
1st place, gold medalist(s)	Pavel Penaz	Czech Republic	15.85
2nd place, silver medalist(s)	Matura Jiri	Czech Republic	12.20
3rd place, bronze medalist(s)	Alejandro Irache	Spain	11.11

=== Throws pentathlon ===
Pos	Athlete	Country	Results
1st place, gold medalist(s)	Pavel Penaz	Czech Republic	4311
2nd place, silver medalist(s)	Grzegorz Pawelski	Poland	3964
3rd place, bronze medalist(s)	Matura Jiri	Czech Republic	3138

=== Decathlon ===
Pos	Athlete	Country	Results
1st place, gold medalist(s)	Christoph Schiefermayer	Austria	7271
2nd place, silver medalist(s)	Stephan Andres	Germany	6036
3rd place, bronze medalist(s)	Andre Wort	Netherlands	5272

=== 5000 metre track race walk ===
Pos	Athlete	Country	Results
1st place, gold medalist(s)	Steffen Meyer	Germany	24:40.42
2nd place, silver medalist(s)	Hakan Caliskan	Turkey	25:59.88
3rd place, bronze medalist(s)	Madars Breide	Latvia	26:54.04

=== 20000 metre road race walk ===
Pos	Athlete	Country	Results
1st place, gold medalist(s)	Steffen Meyer	Germany	1:52:50
2nd place, silver medalist(s)	Hakan Caliskan	Turkey	1:58:09
3rd place, bronze medalist(s)	Franz Kropik	Austria	2:01:27
