= M35 at the 2014 European Masters Athletics Championships =

Athletics competition age class

The nineteenth European Masters Athletics Championships were held in Izmir, Turkey, from August 22–31, 2014. The European Masters Athletics Championships serve the division of the sport of athletics for people over 35 years of age, referred to as masters athletics.

== Results ==
=== 100 metres ===
Pos	Athlete	Country	Results
1st place, gold medalist(s)	Silviu Adrian Nisu	Romania	10.89
2nd place, silver medalist(s)	Ivan Zaitcev	Russia	10.96
3rd place, bronze medalist(s)	Pavel Bubnov	Russia	11.07

=== 200 metres ===
Pos	Athlete	Country	Results
1st place, gold medalist(s)	Silviu Adrian Nisu	Romania	21.79
2nd place, silver medalist(s)	Lawrence Baird	Great Britain	22.71
3rd place, bronze medalist(s)	Adam Bellis	Great Britain	22.97

=== 400 metres ===
Pos	Athlete	Country	Results
1st place, gold medalist(s)	Lawrence Baird	Great Britain	49.94
2nd place, silver medalist(s)	Delroy Mitchell	Great Britain	50.70
3rd place, bronze medalist(s)	Adam Bellis	Great Britain	50.74

=== 800 metres ===
Pos	Athlete	Country	Results
1st place, gold medalist(s)	Marijn van der Putten	Netherlands	1:57.00
2nd place, silver medalist(s)	Christophe Chevaux	France	1:57.27
3rd place, bronze medalist(s)	Juan Antonio Gil	Spain	1:57.73

=== 1500 metres ===
Pos	Athlete	Country	Results
1st place, gold medalist(s)	Christophe Chevaux	France	4:18.05
2nd place, silver medalist(s)	Marijn van der Putten	Netherlands	4:18.14
3rd place, bronze medalist(s)	Faig Baghirov	Azerbaijan	4:22.11

=== 5000 metres ===
Pos	Athlete	Country	Results
1st place, gold medalist(s)	Kristian Nedregaard	Norway	15:52.50
2nd place, silver medalist(s)	Vladimir Srb	Czech Republic	16:02.21
3rd place, bronze medalist(s)	Anders Herrmann	Sweden	16:08.17

=== 10000 metres ===
Pos	Athlete	Country	Results
1st place, gold medalist(s)	Vladimir Srb	Czech Republic	34:47.34
2nd place, silver medalist(s)	Israel Garcia	Spain	35:05.70
3rd place, bronze medalist(s)	Jiri Mirejovsky	Czech Republic	35:12.66

=== 110 metres hurdles ===
Pos	Athlete	Country	Results
1st place, gold medalist(s)	Liam Collins	Great Britain	14.69
2nd place, silver medalist(s)	Sergi Matas	Spain	14.78
3rd place, bronze medalist(s)	Thomas Ritte	Germany	15.97

=== 400 metres hurdles ===
Pos	Athlete	Country	Results
1st place, gold medalist(s)	Liam Collins	Great Britain	54.82
2nd place, silver medalist(s)	Quinten Stern	Netherlands	55.35
3rd place, bronze medalist(s)	Jan Carly	Belgium	55.99

=== 3000 metres steeplechase ===
Pos	Athlete	Country	Results
1st place, gold medalist(s)	Luigi del Buono	Italy	9:52.58
2nd place, silver medalist(s)	Javier Sanz	Spain	10:25.32
3rd place, bronze medalist(s)	Jiri Mirejovsky	Czech Republic	10:43.45

=== 4×100 metres relay ===
Pos	Athletes	Country	Results
1st place, gold medalist(s)	Andrew Flint	Great Britain	43.92
1st place, gold medalist(s)	Lawrence Baird	Great Britain	43.92
1st place, gold medalist(s)	Liam Collins	Great Britain	43.92
1st place, gold medalist(s)	Delroy Mitchell	Great Britain	43.92
2nd place, silver medalist(s)	Stanislav Lepik	Russia	44.74
2nd place, silver medalist(s)	Evgeniy Ivanov	Russia	44.74
2nd place, silver medalist(s)	Nikolai Aptekarev	Russia	44.74
2nd place, silver medalist(s)	Pavel Bubnov	Russia	44.74
3rd place, bronze medalist(s)	Jean Luc Baralle	France	45.03
3rd place, bronze medalist(s)	Frederic Barillet	France	45.03
3rd place, bronze medalist(s)	Jean-Maurice Premont	France	45.03
3rd place, bronze medalist(s)	Christophe Chevaux	France	45.03

=== 4×400 metres relay ===
Pos	Athletes	Country	Results
1st place, gold medalist(s)	Lawrence Baird	Great Britain	3:22.61
1st place, gold medalist(s)	Liam Collins	Great Britain	3:22.61
1st place, gold medalist(s)	Adam Bellis	Great Britain	3:22.61
1st place, gold medalist(s)	Delroy Mitchell	Great Britain	3:22.61
2nd place, silver medalist(s)	Jean-Maurice Premont	France	3:32.48
2nd place, silver medalist(s)	Christophe Chevaux	France	3:32.48
2nd place, silver medalist(s)	Frederic Tremblay	France	3:32.48
2nd place, silver medalist(s)	Frederic Barillet	France	3:32.48
3rd place, bronze medalist(s)	Marcos Venteo	Spain	3:40.41
3rd place, bronze medalist(s)	Sergi Matas	Spain	3:40.41
3rd place, bronze medalist(s)	Javier Portoles	Spain	3:40.41
3rd place, bronze medalist(s)	Juan Antonio Gil	Spain	3:40.41

=== Marathon ===
Pos	Athlete	Country	Results
1st place, gold medalist(s)	Szabolcs Beda	Hungary	2:40:44
2nd place, silver medalist(s)	Oliver Sebrantke	Germany	2:45:11
3rd place, bronze medalist(s)	Gabor Treso	Hungary	3:13:00

=== High jump ===
Pos	Athlete	Country	Results
1st place, gold medalist(s)	Ola Jorgen Karlsson	Sweden	2.06
2nd place, silver medalist(s)	Laurent Jobard	France	1.97
3rd place, bronze medalist(s)	Ivan Ugrinovic	Serbia	1.75

=== Pole vault ===
Pos	Athlete	Country	Results
1st place, gold medalist(s)	Thomas Ritte	Germany	4.50

=== Long jump ===
Pos	Athlete	Country	Results
1st place, gold medalist(s)	Nicolae Dumitrache	Romania	6.71
2nd place, silver medalist(s)	Pierluigi Putzu	Italy	6.65
3rd place, bronze medalist(s)	Pavel Bubnov	Russia	6.58

=== Triple jump ===
Pos	Athlete	Country	Results
1st place, gold medalist(s)	Andreas Beraz	Germany	14.22
2nd place, silver medalist(s)	Krzysztof Ratajczyk	Poland	13.27
3rd place, bronze medalist(s)	Miguel Stucchi	Switzerland	11.24

=== Shot put ===
Pos	Athlete	Country	Results
1st place, gold medalist(s)	Petros Mitsides	Cyprus	15.74
2nd place, silver medalist(s)	Sven Haumacher	Germany	12.16

=== Discus throw ===
Pos	Athlete	Country	Results
1st place, gold medalist(s)	Petros Mitsides	Cyprus	52.30
2nd place, silver medalist(s)	David Erard	Switzerland	41.76
3rd place, bronze medalist(s)	Sven Haumacher	Germany	39.43

=== Hammer throw ===
Pos	Athlete	Country	Results
1st place, gold medalist(s)	Petros Mitsides	Cyprus	50.38
2nd place, silver medalist(s)	Mark Robertson	Great Britain	50.16
3rd place, bronze medalist(s)	Sven Haumacher	Germany	33.37

=== Javelin throw ===
Pos	Athlete	Country	Results
1st place, gold medalist(s)	Lubos Novacek	Czech Republic	62.04
2nd place, silver medalist(s)	Carsten Wollensah	Germany	44.61

=== Weight throw ===
Pos	Athlete	Country	Results
1st place, gold medalist(s)	Stuart Thurgood	Great Britain	16.03

=== Throws pentathlon ===
Pos	Athlete	Country	Results
1st place, gold medalist(s)	Petros Mitsides	Cyprus	3445
2nd place, silver medalist(s)	Sven Haumacher	Germany	2626
3rd place, bronze medalist(s)	Dimitrios Gazis	Greece	2241

=== Decathlon ===
Pos	Athlete	Country	Results
1st place, gold medalist(s)	Branislav Puvak	Slovakia	6579
2nd place, silver medalist(s)	Eric Roso	France	6046
3rd place, bronze medalist(s)	Gavin Fordham	Great Britain	5943

=== 5000 metre track race walk ===
Pos	Athlete	Country	Results
1st place, gold medalist(s)	Francisco Julio Carmona	Spain	24:26.92
2nd place, silver medalist(s)	Jose Manuel Rodriguez	Spain	25:13.74
3rd place, bronze medalist(s)	Igor Sapunov	Italy	25:37.24

=== 20000 metre road race walk ===
Pos	Athlete	Country	Results
1st place, gold medalist(s)	Francisco Julio Carmona	Spain	1:50:47
2nd place, silver medalist(s)	Igor Sapunov	Italy	1:58:21
3rd place, bronze medalist(s)	Gennaro De Lello	Italy	2:01:31
