= Tsegaye Getachew =

Ethiopian long-distance runner

Personal information
- Nationality: Ethiopian
- Born: Tsegaye Getachew; 30 November 1996 (age 29) Ethiopia
- Occupation: Long-distance runner
- Years active: 2017–present

Sport
- Country: Ethiopia
- Sport: Athletics
- Events: Marathon, Half marathon, 10K road

Achievements and titles
- Personal bests: Marathon: 2:04:49 (2022); Half marathon: 1:01:25 (2021); 10 km road: 28:40 (2017)
Medal record
World Marathon Majors
| Bronze medal – third place | 2023 Tokyo | Marathon |

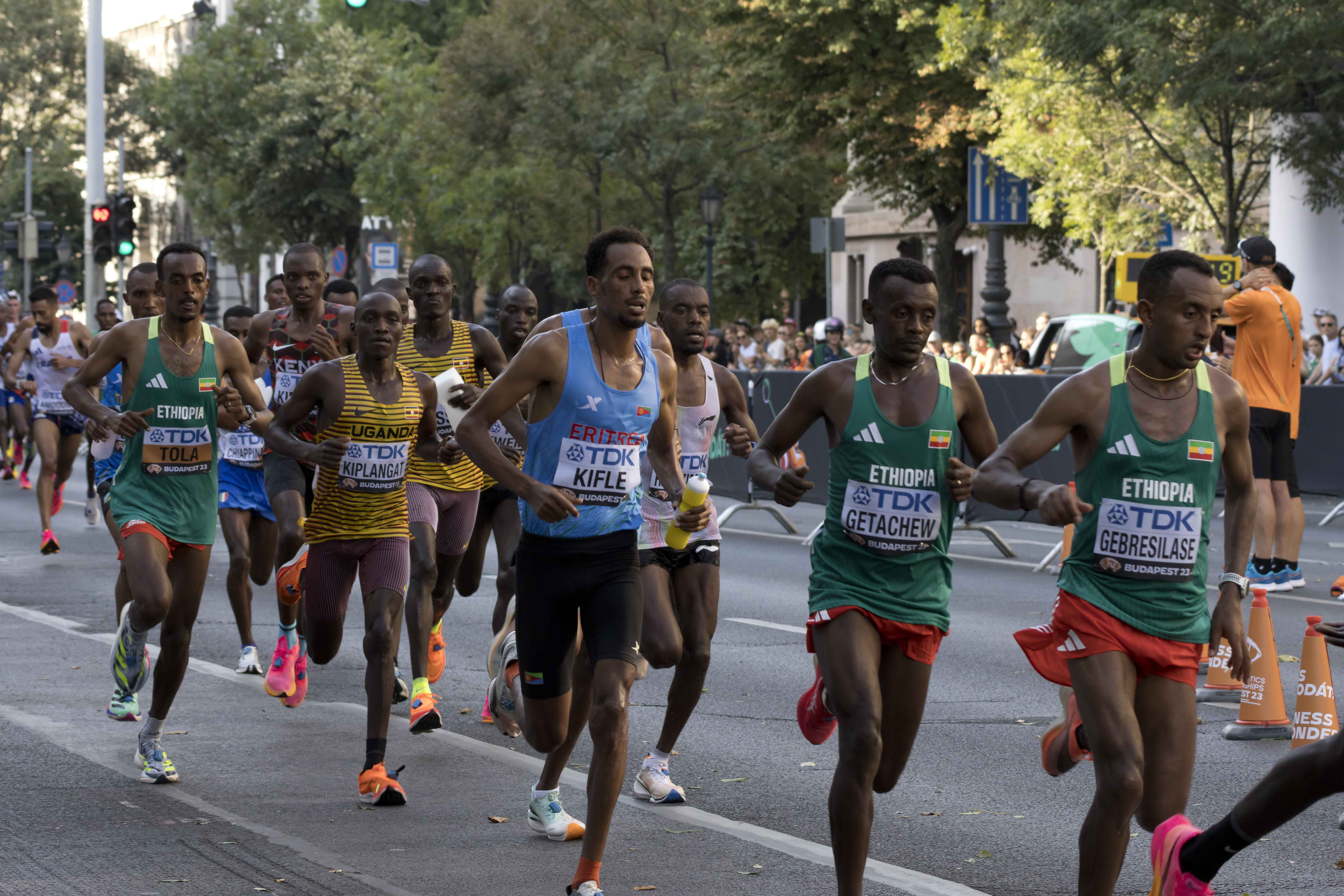

Tsegaye Getachew (born 30 November 1996) is an Ethiopian long-distance runner who specializes in the marathon and half marathon. He has achieved major results at international road running events, including multiple marathon victories and a podium finish at a World Marathon Major.

== Career ==
Tsegaye Getachew began his professional road racing career in 2017, when he set a personal best of 28:40 over 10 kilometres at the Cooper River Bridge Run.

He progressed to the marathon in 2019, earning his first major podium with a third-place finish at the Standard Chartered Hong Kong Marathon, clocking 2:11:12. Later that year, he placed eighth at the Valencia Marathon with a time of 2:06:50.

In 2021, Getachew secured his first marathon victory at the Izmir Marathon, running 2:09:35. He followed this with an impressive seventh-place finish at the Marathon de Paris, improving his personal best to 2:05:11. That same year, he also recorded a half marathon personal best of 1:01:25 at the Ethiopian Half Marathon Championships.

Getachew's breakthrough season came in 2022. He began the year by winning the inaugural Riyadh Marathon in 2:06:22. He then captured one of the biggest victories of his career at the TCS Amsterdam Marathon, where he ran a personal best of 2:04:49 to win the title.

In 2023, Getachew reached the podium at a World Marathon Major, placing third at the Tokyo Marathon with a time of 2:05:25. He was also selected to represent Ethiopia at the 2023 World Athletics Championships in Budapest, where he finished 17th in the marathon.

In 2024, Getachew placed fifth at the Tokyo Marathon with a time of 2:06:25. He later reclaimed his title at the TCS Amsterdam Marathon, winning in 2:05:38 despite taking a wrong turn late in the race.

== Personal bests ==
- Marathon: 2:04:49 (Amsterdam, 16 October 2022)
- Half marathon: 1:01:25 (Ethiopian Half Marathon Championships, 24 April 2021)
- 10 kilometres road: 28:40 (Cooper River Bridge Run, 2 April 2017)

== Achievements ==
| Year | Race | City | Position | Time |
|---|---|---|---|---|
| 2019 | Standard Chartered Hong Kong Marathon | Hong Kong | 3rd | 2:11:12 |
| 2019 | Valencia Marathon | Valencia | 8th | 2:06:50 |
| 2021 | Izmir Marathon | İzmir | 1st | 2:09:35 |
| 2021 | Marathon de Paris | Paris | 7th | 2:05:11 |
| 2022 | Riyadh Marathon | Riyadh | 1st | 2:06:22 |
| 2022 | TCS Amsterdam Marathon | Amsterdam | 1st | 2:04:49 (PB) |
| 2023 | Tokyo Marathon | Tokyo | 3rd | 2:05:25 |
| 2023 | World Athletics Championships | Budapest | 17th | 2:11:56 |
| 2024 | Tokyo Marathon | Tokyo | 5th | 2:06:25 |
| 2024 | TCS Amsterdam Marathon | Amsterdam | 1st | 2:05:38 |
