= M75 at the 2014 European Masters Athletics Championships =

The nineteenth European Masters Athletics Championships were held in Izmir, Turkey, from August 22–31, 2014. The European Masters Athletics Championships serve the division of the sport of athletics for people over 35 years of age, referred to as masters athletics.

== Results ==
=== 100 metres ===
Pos	Athlete	Country	Results
1st place, gold medalist(s)	Guido Mueller	Germany	13.67
2nd place, silver medalist(s)	Aimo Mikkola	Finland	13.89
3rd place, bronze medalist(s)	Hermann Beckering	Germany	14.08

=== 200 metres ===
Pos	Athlete	Country	Results
1st place, gold medalist(s)	Guido Mueller	Germany	27.98
2nd place, silver medalist(s)	Aimo Mikkola	Finland	28.88
3rd place, bronze medalist(s)	Hermann Beckering	Germany	28.98

=== 400 metres ===
Pos	Athlete	Country	Results
1st place, gold medalist(s)	Guido Mueller	Germany	1:03.45
2nd place, silver medalist(s)	Anthony Treacher	Great Britain	1:11.59
3rd place, bronze medalist(s)	Willi Klaus	Germany	1:12.45

=== 800 metres ===
Pos	Athlete	Country	Results
1st place, gold medalist(s)	Klemens Wittig	Germany	2:52.43
2nd place, silver medalist(s)	Yurii Savenkov	Russia	2:52.64
3rd place, bronze medalist(s)	Willi Klaus	Germany	2:53.31

=== 1500 metres ===
Pos	Athlete	Country	Results
1st place, gold medalist(s)	Klemens Wittig	Germany	5:53.99
2nd place, silver medalist(s)	Yurii Savenkov	Russia	6:01.31
3rd place, bronze medalist(s)	Angel Cano	Spain	6:04.91

=== 5000 metres ===
Pos	Athlete	Country	Results
1st place, gold medalist(s)	Klemens Wittig	Germany	21:01.80
2nd place, silver medalist(s)	Bernardino Pereira	Portugal	21:14.94
3rd place, bronze medalist(s)	Tarverdy Aliev	Azerbaijan	21:29.69

=== 10000 metres ===
Pos	Athlete	Country	Results
1st place, gold medalist(s)	Bernardino Pereira	Portugal	46:06.88
2nd place, silver medalist(s)	Henryk Urtnowski	Poland	47:12.09
3rd place, bronze medalist(s)	Jiri Libra	Czech Republic	51:08.99

=== 80 metres hurdles ===
Pos	Athlete	Country	Results
1st place, gold medalist(s)	Guido Mueller	Germany	14.66
2nd place, silver medalist(s)	Kjartan Solvberg	Norway	15.98
3rd place, bronze medalist(s)	Klaus Heidinger	Germany	17.90

=== 300 metres hurdles ===
Pos	Athlete	Country	Results
1st place, gold medalist(s)	Guido Mueller	Germany	49.93
2nd place, silver medalist(s)	Willi Klaus	Germany	56.54
3rd place, bronze medalist(s)	Vladimir Lushchikov	Russia	56.89

=== 2000 metres steeplechase ===
Pos	Athlete	Country	Results
1st place, gold medalist(s)	Klemens Wittig	Germany	9:01.12
2nd place, silver medalist(s)	Yurii Savenkov	Russia	9:46.21
3rd place, bronze medalist(s)	Erguder Yont	Turkey	11:56.05

=== 4×100 metres relay ===
Pos	Athletes	Country	Results
1st place, gold medalist(s)	Hermann Beckering	Germany	55.44 WR
1st place, gold medalist(s)	Klaus Dieter Lange	Germany	55.44 WR
1st place, gold medalist(s)	Karl Schmid	Germany	55.44 WR
1st place, gold medalist(s)	Guido Mueller	Germany	55.44 WR
2nd place, silver medalist(s)	Antti Kanerva	Finland	1:02.53
2nd place, silver medalist(s)	Kauno Anttila	Finland	1:02.53
2nd place, silver medalist(s)	Jouni Tenhu	Finland	1:02.53
2nd place, silver medalist(s)	Aimo Mikkola	Finland	1:02.53
3rd place, bronze medalist(s)	Yurii Savenkov	Russia	1:04.43
3rd place, bronze medalist(s)	Anatolii Romanov	Russia	1:04.43
3rd place, bronze medalist(s)	Ramir Kuramshin	Russia	1:04.43
3rd place, bronze medalist(s)	Iurii Saraev	Russia	1:04.43

=== 4×400 metres relay ===
Pos	Athletes	Country	Results
1st place, gold medalist(s)	Willi Klaus	Germany	5:24.82
1st place, gold medalist(s)	Siegfried Ritter	Germany	5:24.82
1st place, gold medalist(s)	Gerhard Klauder	Germany	5:24.82
1st place, gold medalist(s)	Guido Mueller	Germany	5:24.82
2nd place, silver medalist(s)	Iurii Saraev	Russia	5:39.17
2nd place, silver medalist(s)	Anatolii Romanov	Russia	5:39.17
2nd place, silver medalist(s)	Yurii Savenkov	Russia	5:39.17
2nd place, silver medalist(s)	Ramir Kuramshin	Russia	5:39.17

=== Marathon ===
Pos	Athlete	Country	Results
1st place, gold medalist(s)	Tarverdy Aliev	Azerbaijan	4:10:03

=== High jump ===
Pos	Athlete	Country	Results
1st place, gold medalist(s)	Hans Miekautsch	Austria	1.35
2nd place, silver medalist(s)	Willi Klaus	Germany	1.32
3rd place, bronze medalist(s)	Giorgio Mari Bortolozzi	Italy	1.26

=== Pole vault ===
Pos	Athlete	Country	Results
1st place, gold medalist(s)	Zoltan Kurunczi	Hungary	2.60
2nd place, silver medalist(s)	Lars Wennblom	Sweden	2.50
3rd place, bronze medalist(s)	Knut Henrik Skramstad	Norway	2.20

=== Long jump ===
Pos	Athlete	Country	Results
1st place, gold medalist(s)	Giorgio Mari Bortolozzi	Italy	4.37
2nd place, silver medalist(s)	Anthony Treacher	Great Britain	4.19
3rd place, bronze medalist(s)	Wolfgang Tuchen	Germany	4.11

=== Triple jump ===
Pos	Athlete	Country	Results
1st place, gold medalist(s)	Giorgio Mari Bortolozzi	Italy	9.55
2nd place, silver medalist(s)	Muzaffer Guven	Turkey	8.65
3rd place, bronze medalist(s)	Karl-Heinz Nitschke	Germany	8.03

=== Shot put ===
Pos	Athlete	Country	Results
1st place, gold medalist(s)	Roland Heiler	Germany	12.61
2nd place, silver medalist(s)	Lothar Huchthausen	Germany	12.09
3rd place, bronze medalist(s)	Kjartan Solvberg	Norway	11.56

=== Discus throw ===
Pos	Athlete	Country	Results
1st place, gold medalist(s)	Roland Heiler	Germany	40.79
2nd place, silver medalist(s)	John Watts	Great Britain	37.76
3rd place, bronze medalist(s)	Peter Speckens	Germany	35.63

=== Hammer throw ===
Pos	Athlete	Country	Results
1st place, gold medalist(s)	Antoni Kargol	Poland	39.43
2nd place, silver medalist(s)	Alsaker Alf	Norway	37.43
3rd place, bronze medalist(s)	Lothar Huchthausen	Germany	36.64

=== Javelin throw ===
Pos	Athlete	Country	Results
1st place, gold medalist(s)	Jouni Tenhu	Finland	42.86
2nd place, silver medalist(s)	Lothar Huchthausen	Germany	42.68
3rd place, bronze medalist(s)	Dietrich Hoffmann	Germany	37.27

=== Weight throw ===
Pos	Athlete	Country	Results
1st place, gold medalist(s)	Eero Jarvenpaa	Finland	14.18
2nd place, silver medalist(s)	Peter Speckens	Germany	14.14
3rd place, bronze medalist(s)	Antoni Kargol	Poland	13.98

=== Throws pentathlon ===
Pos	Athlete	Country	Results
1st place, gold medalist(s)	Eero Jarvenpaa	Finland	3728
2nd place, silver medalist(s)	Kjartan Solvberg	Norway	3706
3rd place, bronze medalist(s)	Lothar Huchthausen	Germany	3680

=== Decathlon ===
Pos	Athlete	Country	Results
1st place, gold medalist(s)	Willi Klaus	Germany	6855
2nd place, silver medalist(s)	Vladimir Lushchikov	Russia	6384
3rd place, bronze medalist(s)	Hans Miekautsch	Austria	5450

=== 5000 metre track race walk ===
Pos	Athlete	Country	Results
1st place, gold medalist(s)	Romolo Pelliccia	Italy	30:50.51
2nd place, silver medalist(s)	Edmund Shillabeer	Great Britain	33:08.39
3rd place, bronze medalist(s)	Alexis de Coppet	Switzerland	33:26.49

=== 20000 metre road race walk ===
Pos	Athlete	Country	Results
1st place, gold medalist(s)	Romolo Pelliccia	Italy	2:20:06
2nd place, silver medalist(s)	Edmund Shillabeer	Great Britain	2:21:29
3rd place, bronze medalist(s)	Horst Lenz	Germany	2:37:27
