= M55 at the 2014 European Masters Athletics Championships =

The nineteenth European Masters Athletics Championships were held in Izmir, Turkey, from August 22–31, 2014. The European Masters Athletics Championships serve the division of the sport of athletics for people over 35 years of age, referred to as masters athletics.

== Results ==
=== 100 metres ===
Pos	Athlete	Country	Results
1st place, gold medalist(s)	John Wright	Great Britain	12.07
2nd place, silver medalist(s)	Jeff Battista	Great Britain	12.21
3rd place, bronze medalist(s)	Mykhailo Ostashevskyi	Ukraine	12.25

=== 200 metres ===
Pos	Athlete	Country	Results
1st place, gold medalist(s)	John Wright	Great Britain	24.31
2nd place, silver medalist(s)	Jeff Battista	Great Britain	24.64
3rd place, bronze medalist(s)	Gerhard Zorn	Germany	24.91

=== 400 metres ===
Pos	Athlete	Country	Results
1st place, gold medalist(s)	Gerhard Zorn	Germany	54.38
2nd place, silver medalist(s)	Stephan Zulauf	Switzerland	55.95
3rd place, bronze medalist(s)	Anthony Martin	Ireland	56.09

=== 800 metres ===
Pos	Athlete	Country	Results
1st place, gold medalist(s)	Keith McGhie	Great Britain	2:11.27
2nd place, silver medalist(s)	Alfredo Bonetti	Italy	2:12.27
3rd place, bronze medalist(s)	Franco Maffei	Italy	2:14.37

=== 1500 metres ===
Pos	Athlete	Country	Results
1st place, gold medalist(s)	John Thomson	Great Britain	4:31.82
2nd place, silver medalist(s)	Franco Maffei	Italy	4:36.60
3rd place, bronze medalist(s)	Ryszard Dryps	Poland	4:36.97

=== 5000 metres ===
Pos	Athlete	Country	Results
1st place, gold medalist(s)	Tore Axelsson	Sweden	17:09.24
2nd place, silver medalist(s)	Cesar Perez	Spain	17:13.47
3rd place, bronze medalist(s)	Ihar Dolbik	Belarus	17:19.42

=== 10000 metres ===
Pos	Athlete	Country	Results
1st place, gold medalist(s)	Ihar Dolbik	Belarus	35:12.44
2nd place, silver medalist(s)	Necat Hummet	Turkey	39:15.74
3rd place, bronze medalist(s)	Raffaele Colantuono	Italy	39:36.34

=== 100 metres hurdles ===
Pos	Athlete	Country	Results
1st place, gold medalist(s)	Tennyson James	Great Britain	15.01
2nd place, silver medalist(s)	Timo Rajamaki	Finland	15.20
3rd place, bronze medalist(s)	John Mayor	Great Britain	15.20

=== 400 metres hurdles ===
Pos	Athlete	Country	Results
1st place, gold medalist(s)	Heiner Lueers	Germany	1:03.58
2nd place, silver medalist(s)	David Moles	Great Britain	1:04.86
3rd place, bronze medalist(s)	Albert Soba	Slovenia	1:05.09

=== 3000 metres steeplechase ===
Pos	Athlete	Country	Results
1st place, gold medalist(s)	Cesar Perez	Spain	10:38.38
2nd place, silver medalist(s)	Stanislaw Lancucki	Poland	10:54.36
3rd place, bronze medalist(s)	Hristo Kolev	Bulgaria	11:52.39

=== 4×100 metres relay ===
Pos	Athletes	Country	Results
1st place, gold medalist(s)	Jeff Battista	Great Britain	47.45
1st place, gold medalist(s)	Tennyson James	Great Britain	47.45
1st place, gold medalist(s)	John Mayor	Great Britain	47.45
1st place, gold medalist(s)	John Wright	Great Britain	47.45
2nd place, silver medalist(s)	Ernst Becker	Germany	49.72
2nd place, silver medalist(s)	Gerhard Zorn	Germany	49.72
2nd place, silver medalist(s)	Gunter Langenbach	Germany	49.72
2nd place, silver medalist(s)	Heiner Lueers	Germany	49.72
3rd place, bronze medalist(s)	Fikret Nec Ozisikyilmaz	Turkey	50.33
3rd place, bronze medalist(s)	Ali Kara	Turkey	50.33
3rd place, bronze medalist(s)	Armagan Akgul	Turkey	50.33
3rd place, bronze medalist(s)	Guner Gungor	Turkey	50.33

=== 4×400 metres relay ===
Pos	Athletes	Country	Results
1st place, gold medalist(s)	John Wright	Great Britain	3:52.75
1st place, gold medalist(s)	Jeff Battista	Great Britain	3:52.75
1st place, gold medalist(s)	John Mayor	Great Britain	3:52.75
1st place, gold medalist(s)	Keith McGhie	Great Britain	3:52.75
2nd place, silver medalist(s)	Reinhard Hofner	Germany	3:59.79
2nd place, silver medalist(s)	Gunter Langenbach	Germany	3:59.79
2nd place, silver medalist(s)	Heiner Lueers	Germany	3:59.79
2nd place, silver medalist(s)	Gerhard Zorn	Germany	3:59.79
3rd place, bronze medalist(s)	Claudio Rapaccioni	Italy	4:12.88
3rd place, bronze medalist(s)	Rudolf Frei	Italy	4:12.88
3rd place, bronze medalist(s)	Mauro Bianchi	Italy	4:12.88
3rd place, bronze medalist(s)	Adel Salama	Italy	4:12.88

=== Marathon ===
Pos	Athlete	Country	Results
1st place, gold medalist(s)	Ihar Dolbik	Belarus	2:48:04
2nd place, silver medalist(s)	Alvaro Diez	Spain	3:01:54
3rd place, bronze medalist(s)	Necat Hummet	Turkey	3:22:41

=== High jump ===
Pos	Athlete	Country	Results
1st place, gold medalist(s)	Maksym Yehorov	Ukraine	1.75
2nd place, silver medalist(s)	Ruslan Chebakov	Russia	1.75
3rd place, bronze medalist(s)	Alexey Puzakov	Russia	1.69

=== Pole vault ===
Pos	Athlete	Country	Results
1st place, gold medalist(s)	Risto Jarvi	Finland	3.60
2nd place, silver medalist(s)	Daniel Schuetz	Switzerland	3.50
3rd place, bronze medalist(s)	Miroslav Bajner	Slovakia	3.30

=== Long jump ===
Pos	Athlete	Country	Results
1st place, gold medalist(s)	Joel Pluton	France	5.81
2nd place, silver medalist(s)	Timo Rajamaki	Finland	5.51
3rd place, bronze medalist(s)	Wieslaw Musial	Poland	5.50

=== Triple jump ===
Pos	Athlete	Country	Results
1st place, gold medalist(s)	Wolfgang Knabe	Germany	14.13 WR
2nd place, silver medalist(s)	Giancarlo Ciceri	Italy	11.99
3rd place, bronze medalist(s)	Michael Pagels	Germany	11.99

=== Shot put ===
Pos	Athlete	Country	Results
1st place, gold medalist(s)	Alexandr Medvedev	Russia	14.45
2nd place, silver medalist(s)	Mikhail Kostin	Russia	14.17
3rd place, bronze medalist(s)	Henryk Radzikowski	Poland	13.83

=== Discus throw ===
Pos	Athlete	Country	Results
1st place, gold medalist(s)	Bob Broadridge	Great Britain	44.66
2nd place, silver medalist(s)	John Moreland	Great Britain	44.58
3rd place, bronze medalist(s)	Saulius Svilainis	Lithuania	43.97

=== Hammer throw ===
Pos	Athlete	Country	Results
1st place, gold medalist(s)	Victor Bobryshev	Russia	57.71
2nd place, silver medalist(s)	Johann Lindner	Austria	53.85
3rd place, bronze medalist(s)	Sergei Vasenko	Russia	52.25

=== Javelin throw ===
Pos	Athlete	Country	Results
1st place, gold medalist(s)	Reinhold Paul	Germany	54.02
2nd place, silver medalist(s)	Dainis Kula	Latvia	52.77
3rd place, bronze medalist(s)	Josef Schaffarzik	Germany	50.67

=== Weight throw ===
Pos	Athlete	Country	Results
1st place, gold medalist(s)	Johann Lindner	Austria	18.93
2nd place, silver medalist(s)	Sergei Vasenko	Russia	17.76
3rd place, bronze medalist(s)	Victor Bobryshev	Russia	17.56

=== Throws pentathlon ===
Pos	Athlete	Country	Results
1st place, gold medalist(s)	Karl Hoff	Norway	3977
2nd place, silver medalist(s)	Sergei Vasenko	Russia	3961
3rd place, bronze medalist(s)	Saulius Svilainis	Lithuania	3955

=== Decathlon ===
Pos	Athlete	Country	Results
1st place, gold medalist(s)	Timo Rajamaki	Finland	7137
2nd place, silver medalist(s)	Brian Slaughter	Great Britain	6780
3rd place, bronze medalist(s)	Saulius Svilainis	Lithuania	6775

=== 5000 metre track race walk ===
Pos	Athlete	Country	Results
1st place, gold medalist(s)	Gabriele Caldarelli	Italy	25:58.20
2nd place, silver medalist(s)	Helmut Prieler	Germany	27:02.03
3rd place, bronze medalist(s)	Sergey Lyzhin	Russia	27:27.77

=== 20000 metre road race walk ===
Pos	Athlete	Country	Results
1st place, gold medalist(s)	Gabriele Caldarelli	Italy	1:54:07
2nd place, silver medalist(s)	Helmut Prieler	Germany	1:55:57
3rd place, bronze medalist(s)	F. Venturi Degli Esposti	Italy	2:04:20
