= M70 at the 2014 European Masters Athletics Championships =

The nineteenth European Masters Athletics Championships were held in Izmir, Turkey, from August 22–31, 2014. The European Masters Athletics Championships serve the division of the sport of athletics for people over 35 years of age, referred to as masters athletics.

== Results ==
=== 100 metres ===
Pos	Athlete	Country	Results
1st place, gold medalist(s)	Ulf Restle	Germany	13.76
2nd place, silver medalist(s)	Terry Bissett	Great Britain	13.87
3rd place, bronze medalist(s)	Friedhelm Adorf	Germany	13.89

=== 200 metres ===
Pos	Athlete	Country	Results
1st place, gold medalist(s)	Friedhelm Adorf	Germany	28.26
2nd place, silver medalist(s)	Terry Bissett	Great Britain	28.51
3rd place, bronze medalist(s)	Ulf Restle	Germany	30.17

=== 400 metres ===
Pos	Athlete	Country	Results
1st place, gold medalist(s)	John MacDermott	Ireland	1:04.69
2nd place, silver medalist(s)	Friedhelm Adorf	Germany	1:06.85
3rd place, bronze medalist(s)	Grudi Grudev	Bulgaria	1:08.42

=== 800 metres ===
Pos	Athlete	Country	Results
1st place, gold medalist(s)	Markku Juopperi	Finland	2:53.13
2nd place, silver medalist(s)	Barrie Roberts	Great Britain	3:03.06
3rd place, bronze medalist(s)	Anatolii Onuchin	Russia	3:42.10

=== 1500 metres ===
Pos	Athlete	Country	Results
1st place, gold medalist(s)	Emilio de la Camara	Spain	5:39.83
2nd place, silver medalist(s)	Vladimir Malykh	Russia	5:40.34
3rd place, bronze medalist(s)	Apostolos Venetiadis	Greece	5:54.68

=== 5000 metres ===
Pos	Athlete	Country	Results
1st place, gold medalist(s)	Emilio de la Camara	Spain	20:19.05
2nd place, silver medalist(s)	Vladimir Malykh	Russia	21:08.99
3rd place, bronze medalist(s)	Oemer Sirin	Germany	21:12.74

=== 10000 metres ===
Pos	Athlete	Country	Results
1st place, gold medalist(s)	Emilio de la Camara	Spain	41:33.59
2nd place, silver medalist(s)	Peter Lessing	Germany	44:26.56
3rd place, bronze medalist(s)	Jose Antonio Arias	Spain	44:36.91

=== 80 metres hurdles ===
Pos	Athlete	Country	Results
1st place, gold medalist(s)	Dietmar Steiner	Austria	13.95
2nd place, silver medalist(s)	Barry Ferguson	Great Britain	14.71
3rd place, bronze medalist(s)	Valery Ukhov	Russia	14.96

=== 300 metres hurdles ===
Pos	Athlete	Country	Results
1st place, gold medalist(s)	John MacDermott	Ireland	49.77
2nd place, silver medalist(s)	Dietmar Steiner	Austria	52.20
3rd place, bronze medalist(s)	Barry Ferguson	Great Britain	55.85

=== 2000 meters steeplechase ===
Pos	Athlete	Country	Results
1st place, gold medalist(s)	Emilio de la Camara	Spain	8:10.46
2nd place, silver medalist(s)	Vladimir Malykh	Russia	8:49.07
3rd place, bronze medalist(s)	Mikhail Burkot	Russia	10:02.86

=== 4×100 metres relay ===
Pos	Athletes	Country	Results
1st place, gold medalist(s)	Theodor Lenk	Germany	58.36
1st place, gold medalist(s)	Friedhelm Adorf	Germany	58.36
1st place, gold medalist(s)	Gregor Strasshofer	Germany	58.36
1st place, gold medalist(s)	Ulf Restle	Germany	58.36
2nd place, silver medalist(s)	Alexander Vnukov	Russia	1:03.18
2nd place, silver medalist(s)	Vladimir Roytman	Russia	1:03.18
2nd place, silver medalist(s)	Yury Chirkov	Russia	1:03.18
2nd place, silver medalist(s)	Valery Ukhov	Russia	1:03.18
3rd place, bronze medalist(s)	Veikko Tolvanen	Finland	1:07.56
3rd place, bronze medalist(s)	Jorma Pirinen	Finland	1:07.56
3rd place, bronze medalist(s)	Kunto Viiru	Finland	1:07.56
3rd place, bronze medalist(s)	Kyosti Poutiainen	Finland	1:07.56

=== 4×400 metres relay ===
Pos	Athletes	Country	Results
1st place, gold medalist(s)	Franz Timmermann	Germany	5:01.05
1st place, gold medalist(s)	Hartmann Knorr	Germany	5:01.05
1st place, gold medalist(s)	Werner Kappei	Germany	5:01.05
1st place, gold medalist(s)	Friedhelm Adorf	Germany	5:01.05

=== Marathon ===
Pos	Athlete	Country	Results
1st place, gold medalist(s)	Dmytro Lebediev	Ukraine	3:40:22
2nd place, silver medalist(s)	Werner Stoecker	Germany	3:41:36
3rd place, bronze medalist(s)	Jose Antonio Arias	Spain	3:52:42

=== High jump ===
Pos	Athlete	Country	Results
1st place, gold medalist(s)	Gunnar Ekstedt	Sweden	1.42
2nd place, silver medalist(s)	Kyosti Poutiainen	Finland	1.36
3rd place, bronze medalist(s)	Jiri Mikulic	Czech Republic	1.36

=== Pole vault ===
Pos	Athlete	Country	Results
1st place, gold medalist(s)	Walter Zbinden	Switzerland	2.70
2nd place, silver medalist(s)	Josef Halder	Germany	2.60
3rd place, bronze medalist(s)	Kyosti Poutiainen	Finland	2.60

=== Long jump ===
Pos	Athlete	Country	Results
1st place, gold medalist(s)	Friedhelm Adorf	Germany	4.71
2nd place, silver medalist(s)	Jurgen Lamp	Estonia	4.63
3rd place, bronze medalist(s)	Alexander Vnukov	Russia	4.31

=== Triple jump ===
Pos	Athlete	Country	Results
1st place, gold medalist(s)	Jurgen Lamp	Estonia	10.60
2nd place, silver medalist(s)	Alexander Vnukov	Russia	9.07
3rd place, bronze medalist(s)	Fedor Shcherbina	Russia	9.04

=== Shot put ===
Pos	Athlete	Country	Results
1st place, gold medalist(s)	Czeslaw Roszczak	Poland	12.83
2nd place, silver medalist(s)	Borys Kovalskyi	Ukraine	11.93
3rd place, bronze medalist(s)	Stanko Maric	Bosnia and Herzegovina	11.19

=== Discus throw ===
Pos	Athlete	Country	Results
1st place, gold medalist(s)	Peter Hackenschmidt	Sweden	40.92
2nd place, silver medalist(s)	Czeslaw Roszczak	Poland	40.92
3rd place, bronze medalist(s)	Helmut Lang	Austria	40.73

=== Hammer throw ===
Pos	Athlete	Country	Results
1st place, gold medalist(s)	Heimo Viertbauer	Austria	54.25
2nd place, silver medalist(s)	Esko Palviainen	Finland	43.51
3rd place, bronze medalist(s)	Wilhelm Kraatz	Germany	39.77

=== Javelin throw ===
Pos	Athlete	Country	Results
1st place, gold medalist(s)	Antal Hegedus	Hungary	36.48
2nd place, silver medalist(s)	Reiner Goertz	Germany	33.51
3rd place, bronze medalist(s)	Josef Halder	Germany	32.58

=== Weight throw ===
Pos	Athlete	Country	Results
1st place, gold medalist(s)	Heimo Viertbauer	Austria	16.37
2nd place, silver medalist(s)	Wilhelm Kraatz	Germany	15.54
3rd place, bronze medalist(s)	Czeslaw Roszczak	Poland	15.32

=== Throws pentathlon ===
Pos	Athlete	Country	Results
1st place, gold medalist(s)	Bernd Hasieber	Germany	4082
2nd place, silver medalist(s)	Peter Hackenschmidt	Sweden	4072
3rd place, bronze medalist(s)	Czeslaw Roszczak	Poland	4066

=== Decathlon ===
Pos	Athlete	Country	Results
1st place, gold medalist(s)	Rolf Geese	Germany	7189
2nd place, silver medalist(s)	Gregor Strasshofer	Germany	5343
3rd place, bronze medalist(s)	Tadeusz Miasek	Poland	4141

=== 5000 metre track race walk ===
Pos	Athlete	Country	Results
1st place, gold medalist(s)	Ants Palmar	Estonia	30:08.55
2nd place, silver medalist(s)	Alexandr Sartakov	Russia	31:31.91
3rd place, bronze medalist(s)	Christoph Höhne	Germany	31:39.30

=== 20000 metre road race walk ===
Pos	Athlete	Country	Results
1st place, gold medalist(s)	Ants Palmar	Estonia	2:15:23
2nd place, silver medalist(s)	Alexandr Sartakov	Russia	2:19:26
3rd place, bronze medalist(s)	Christoph Höhne	Germany	2:19:38
