= M85 at the 2014 European Masters Athletics Championships =

The nineteenth European Masters Athletics Championships were held in Izmir, Turkey, from August 22–31, 2014. The European Masters Athletics Championships serve the division of the sport of athletics for people over 35 years of age, referred to as masters athletics.

== Results ==
=== 100 metres ===
Pos	Athlete	Country	Results
1st place, gold medalist(s)	Wolfgang Reuter	Germany	17.43
2nd place, silver medalist(s)	Suat Akgun	Turkey	18.03
3rd place, bronze medalist(s)	Konstan Chatziemmanouil	Greece	19.47

=== 200 metres ===
Pos	Athlete	Country	Results
1st place, gold medalist(s)	Wolfgang Reuter	Germany	39.61
2nd place, silver medalist(s)	Andre Strubbe	Belgium	41.13
3rd place, bronze medalist(s)	Konstan Chatziemmanouil	Greece	41.23

=== 400 metres ===
Pos	Athlete	Country	Results
1st place, gold medalist(s)	Konstan Chatziemmanouil	Greece	1:41.63
2nd place, silver medalist(s)	Eckart Maas	Germany	1:46.33

=== 800 metres ===
Pos	Athlete	Country	Results
1st place, gold medalist(s)	Eckart Maas	Germany	4:20.37
2nd place, silver medalist(s)	Alcide Magarini	Italy	5:08.90

=== 5000 metres ===
Pos	Athlete	Country	Results
1st place, gold medalist(s)	Erdogan Dulda	Turkey	33:48.14
2nd place, silver medalist(s)	Karel Matzner	Czech Republic	35:12.52

=== 4×100 metres relay ===
Pos	Athletes	Country	Results
1st place, gold medalist(s)	Gerhard Herbst	Germany	1:25.23
1st place, gold medalist(s)	Wolfgang Reuter	Germany	1:25.23
1st place, gold medalist(s)	Eckart Maas	Germany	1:25.23
1st place, gold medalist(s)	Alfred Fischer	Germany	1:25.23

=== High jump ===
Pos	Athlete	Country	Results
1st place, gold medalist(s)	Wolfgang Reuter	Germany	1.11
2nd place, silver medalist(s)	Eckart Maas	Germany	0.87

=== Long jump ===
Pos	Athlete	Country	Results
1st place, gold medalist(s)	Wolfgang Reuter	Germany	3.31
2nd place, silver medalist(s)	Suat Akgun	Turkey	2.75
3rd place, bronze medalist(s)	Eckart Maas	Germany	2.33

=== Triple jump ===
Pos	Athlete	Country	Results
1st place, gold medalist(s)	Wolfgang Reuter	Germany	6.86
2nd place, silver medalist(s)	Suat Akgun	Turkey	6.28

=== Shot put ===
Pos	Athlete	Country	Results
1st place, gold medalist(s)	Leo Saarinen	Finland	11.20
2nd place, silver medalist(s)	Sinasi Ertan	Turkey	7.56

=== Discus throw ===
Pos	Athlete	Country	Results
1st place, gold medalist(s)	Leo Saarinen	Finland	22.59

=== Hammer throw ===
Pos	Athlete	Country	Results
1st place, gold medalist(s)	Leo Saarinen	Finland	27.06
2nd place, silver medalist(s)	Sinasi Ertan	Turkey	20.97

=== Javelin throw ===
Pos	Athlete	Country	Results
1st place, gold medalist(s)	Pavel Jilek	Czech Republic	23.71

=== Weight throw ===
Pos	Athlete	Country	Results
1st place, gold medalist(s)	Leo Saarinen	Greece	10.28

=== Throws pentathlon ===
Pos	Athlete	Country	Results
1st place, gold medalist(s)	Leo Saarinen	Finland	3504
2nd place, silver medalist(s)	Pavel Jilek	Czech Republic	2641
