= M50 at the 2014 European Masters Athletics Championships =

The nineteenth European Masters Athletics Championships were held in Izmir, Turkey, from August 22–31, 2014. The European Masters Athletics Championships serve the division of the sport of athletics for people over 35 years of age, referred to as masters athletics.

== Results ==
=== 100 metres ===
Pos	Athlete	Country	Results
1st place, gold medalist(s)	Roland Groeger	Germany	11.55
2nd place, silver medalist(s)	Donald Brown	Great Britain	11.67
3rd place, bronze medalist(s)	Francois Bontemps	France	12.08

=== 200 metres ===
Pos	Athlete	Country	Results
1st place, gold medalist(s)	Roland Groeger	Germany	23.51
2nd place, silver medalist(s)	Donald Brown	Great Britain	24.28
3rd place, bronze medalist(s)	Javier Guridi	Spain	24.85

=== 400 metres ===
Pos	Athlete	Country	Results
1st place, gold medalist(s)	Carlos Jaramillo	Spain	57.40
2nd place, silver medalist(s)	Rene Pedersen	Denmark	57.54
3rd place, bronze medalist(s)	Bob Lewis	Great Britain	57.58

=== 800 metres ===
Pos	Athlete	Country	Results
1st place, gold medalist(s)	Benoit Zavattero	France	2:03.60
2nd place, silver medalist(s)	Rob Andrew	Great Britain	2:05.58
3rd place, bronze medalist(s)	Giuseppe Mario	Italy	2:05.72

=== 1500 metres ===
Pos	Athlete	Country	Results
1st place, gold medalist(s)	Habib Abdellaoui	France	4:24.71
2nd place, silver medalist(s)	Rene Pedersen	Denmark	4:25.08
3rd place, bronze medalist(s)	Jukka Kaukola	Finland	4:26.16

=== 5000 metres ===
Pos	Athlete	Country	Results
1st place, gold medalist(s)	Francisco Jav Fontaneda	Spain	16:16.57
2nd place, silver medalist(s)	Oleg Strizhakov	Russia	16:30.56
3rd place, bronze medalist(s)	Paul Cowhie	Ireland	16:36.52

=== 10000 metres ===
Pos	Athlete	Country	Results
1st place, gold medalist(s)	Francisco Jav Fontaneda	Spain	34:47.03
2nd place, silver medalist(s)	Oleg Strizhakov	Russia	35:11.62
3rd place, bronze medalist(s)	Sergey Loginov	Russia	38:10.78

=== 100 metres hurdles ===
Pos	Athlete	Country	Results
1st place, gold medalist(s)	Clarence Allen	Great Britain	14.42
2nd place, silver medalist(s)	Donald Brown	Great Britain	14.54
3rd place, bronze medalist(s)	Marko Bozicek	Slovenia	14.74

=== 400 metres hurdles ===
Pos	Athlete	Country	Results
1st place, gold medalist(s)	Frederic Peroni	Italy	1:01.17
2nd place, silver medalist(s)	Marko Bozicek	Slovenia	1:02.01
3rd place, bronze medalist(s)	Thierry Zapha	France	1:03.40

=== 3000 metres steeplechase ===
Pos	Athlete	Country	Results
1st place, gold medalist(s)	Gilles Pelletier	France	10:17.25
2nd place, silver medalist(s)	Gianfrano Belluomo	Italy	10:58.96
3rd place, bronze medalist(s)	Ersin Ata	Turkey	11:10.43

=== 4×100 metres relay ===
Pos	Athletes	Country	Results
1st place, gold medalist(s)	Ruslan Dobrynin	Russia	47.63
1st place, gold medalist(s)	Lev Shapkhaev	Russia	47.63
1st place, gold medalist(s)	Mikhail Moiseev	Russia	47.63
1st place, gold medalist(s)	Victor Martynov	Russia	47.63
2nd place, silver medalist(s)	Adel Salama	Italy	51.68
2nd place, silver medalist(s)	Claudio Rapaccioni	Italy	51.68
2nd place, silver medalist(s)	Alessandro Manfredi	Italy	51.68
2nd place, silver medalist(s)	Rudolf Frei	Italy	51.68

=== 4×400 metres relay ===
Pos	Athletes	Country	Results
1st place, gold medalist(s)	Viktor Stupnitskiy	Russia	3:59.59
1st place, gold medalist(s)	Konstantin Shestakov	Russia	3:59.59
1st place, gold medalist(s)	Vadim Ankudinov	Russia	3:59.59
1st place, gold medalist(s)	Vladislav Kutsaev	Russia	3:59.59
2nd place, silver medalist(s)	Antonio Nencini	Italy	4:04.40
2nd place, silver medalist(s)	Alessandro Manfredi	Italy	4:04.40
2nd place, silver medalist(s)	Gianfranco Belluomo	Italy	4:04.40
2nd place, silver medalist(s)	Giuseppe Romeo	Italy	4:04.40
3rd place, bronze medalist(s)	Ersin Ata	Turkey	4:31.80
3rd place, bronze medalist(s)	Ali Turan	Turkey	4:31.80
3rd place, bronze medalist(s)	Ahmet Yasar	Turkey	4:31.80
3rd place, bronze medalist(s)	Mithat Sahin	Turkey	4:31.80

=== Marathon ===
Pos	Athlete	Country	Results
1st place, gold medalist(s)	Jose Perona	Spain	2:49:56
2nd place, silver medalist(s)	Harmen de Vries	Netherlands	3:06:40
3rd place, bronze medalist(s)	Tayfun Carli	Turkey	3:10:40

=== High jump ===
Pos	Athlete	Country	Results
1st place, gold medalist(s)	Marco Cla Mastrolorenzi	Italy	1.76
2nd place, silver medalist(s)	Alexei Davydov	Russia	1.73
3rd place, bronze medalist(s)	Aleksey Urdaev	Russia	1.70

=== Pole vault ===
Pos	Athlete	Country	Results
1st place, gold medalist(s)	Jean-Jacques Michel	France	3.70
2nd place, silver medalist(s)	Iztok Dimitrijevic	Slovenia	3.60
3rd place, bronze medalist(s)	Allan Leiper	Great Britain	3.50

=== Long jump ===
Pos	Athlete	Country	Results
1st place, gold medalist(s)	Gianni Becatti	Italy	6.59
2nd place, silver medalist(s)	Thomas Straub	Germany	6.25
3rd place, bronze medalist(s)	Oddvar Viulsrod	Norway	6.14

=== Triple jump ===
Pos	Athlete	Country	Results
1st place, gold medalist(s)	Alfred Stummer	Austria	12.99
2nd place, silver medalist(s)	Oddvar Viulsrod	Norway	12.63
3rd place, bronze medalist(s)	Paul Zipperle	Italy	12.50

=== Shot put ===
Pos	Athlete	Country	Results
1st place, gold medalist(s)	Norbert Demmel	Germany	15.15
2nd place, silver medalist(s)	Saulius Kleiza	Lithuania	14.60
3rd place, bronze medalist(s)	Damir Ludvig	Croatia	13.90

=== Discus throw ===
Pos	Athlete	Country	Results
1st place, gold medalist(s)	Harri Uurainen	Finland	52.90
2nd place, silver medalist(s)	Norbert Demmel	Germany	50.93
3rd place, bronze medalist(s)	Arnaud Dupuis	France	45.05

=== Hammer throw ===
Pos	Athlete	Country	Results
1st place, gold medalist(s)	Lech Kowalski	Poland	53.33
2nd place, silver medalist(s)	Yury Kurilkin	Russia	50.31
3rd place, bronze medalist(s)	Jose Antonio Villacampa	Spain	50.06

=== Javelin throw ===
Pos	Athlete	Country	Results
1st place, gold medalist(s)	Alain Guicharrousse	France	57.36
2nd place, silver medalist(s)	Emmanuel Greber	France	57.14
3rd place, bronze medalist(s)	Sergey Lodochnikov	Russia	51.50

=== Weight throw ===
Pos	Athlete	Country	Results
1st place, gold medalist(s)	Lech Kowalski	Poland	19.38
2nd place, silver medalist(s)	Rik Demuynck	Belgium	17.81
3rd place, bronze medalist(s)	Jose Antonio Villacampa	Spain	16.18

=== Throws pentathlon ===
Pos	Athlete	Country	Results
1st place, gold medalist(s)	Stephen Whyte	Great Britain	4357
2nd place, silver medalist(s)	Norbert Demmel	Germany	3998
3rd place, bronze medalist(s)	Onno Heerlien	Netherlands	3367

=== Decathlon ===
Pos	Athlete	Country	Results
1st place, gold medalist(s)	Jerzy Krauze	Poland	7039
2nd place, silver medalist(s)	Henrik Gulbinovic	Lithuania	6663
3rd place, bronze medalist(s)	Gerd Westphal	Germany	6625

=== 5000 metre track race walk ===
Pos	Athlete	Country	Results
1st place, gold medalist(s)	Miguel Perianez	Spain	23:44.98
2nd place, silver medalist(s)	Walter Arena	Italy	25:26.27
3rd place, bronze medalist(s)	Uwe Schroeter	Germany	25:28.98

=== 20000 metre road race walk ===
Pos	Athlete	Country	Results
1st place, gold medalist(s)	Uwe Schroeter	Germany	1:49:41
2nd place, silver medalist(s)	Luis Abadias	Spain	2:02:48
3rd place, bronze medalist(s)	Igor Agishev	Russia	2:06:13
