= M40 at the 2014 European Masters Athletics Championships =

The nineteenth European Masters Athletics Championships were held in Izmir, Turkey, from August 22–31, 2014. The European Masters Athletics Championships serve the division of the sport of athletics for people over 35 years of age, referred to as masters athletics.

== Results ==
=== 100 metres ===
Pos	Athlete	Country	Results
1st place, gold medalist(s)	Ricardo Lemos	Portugal	11.22
2nd place, silver medalist(s)	Ed White	Great Britain	11.32
3rd place, bronze medalist(s)	Mark Collins	Great Britain	11.42

=== 200 metres ===
Pos	Athlete	Country	Results
1st place, gold medalist(s)	Ricardo Lemos	Portugal	22.86
2nd place, silver medalist(s)	Brian O. Joergensen	Denmark	22.95
3rd place, bronze medalist(s)	Jim Tipper	Great Britain	23.01

=== 400 metres ===
Pos	Athlete	Country	Results
1st place, gold medalist(s)	Peter Wallin	Sweden	52.93
2nd place, silver medalist(s)	Brian O. Joergensen	Denmark	53.07
3rd place, bronze medalist(s)	Richard Rubenis	Great Britain	53.08

=== 800 metres ===
Pos	Athlete	Country	Results
1st place, gold medalist(s)	Martin Aust	Czech Republic	1:59.99
2nd place, silver medalist(s)	Raul Aragon	Spain	2:00.04
3rd place, bronze medalist(s)	Mircea Mih Alexandrescu	Romania	2:02.98

=== 1500 metres ===
Pos	Athlete	Country	Results
1st place, gold medalist(s)	Martin Aust	Czech Republic	4:11.87
2nd place, silver medalist(s)	Viktor Kirsch	Germany	4:12.49
3rd place, bronze medalist(s)	Jerome Besnard	France	4:14.13

=== 5000 metres ===
Pos	Athlete	Country	Results
1st place, gold medalist(s)	Viktor Kirsch	Germany	15:55.04
2nd place, silver medalist(s)	Michele Bruzzone	Italy	15:57.18
3rd place, bronze medalist(s)	Celinski Robert	Poland	16:11.65

=== 10000 metres ===
Pos	Athlete	Country	Results
1st place, gold medalist(s)	Henadzi Zhauronak	Belarus	34:42.47
2nd place, silver medalist(s)	Dragoljub Koprivica	Montenegro	35:24.81
3rd place, bronze medalist(s)	Bernard Te Boekhorst	Netherlands	35:46.27

=== 110 metres hurdles ===
Pos	Athlete	Country	Results
1st place, gold medalist(s)	Thomas Keller	Switzerland	14.55
2nd place, silver medalist(s)	Volodymyr Dobrydniev	Ukraine	15.45
3rd place, bronze medalist(s)	Benoit Thommerel	France	15.56

=== 400 metres hurdles ===
Pos	Athlete	Country	Results
1st place, gold medalist(s)	Fabrizio Crino	Italy	56.87
2nd place, silver medalist(s)	Benoit Thommerel	France	58.80
3rd place, bronze medalist(s)	Darko Sapic	Serbia	1:03.58

=== 3000 metres steeplechase ===
Pos	Athlete	Country	Results
1st place, gold medalist(s)	Katerin Stoilov	Bulgaria	10:30.15
2nd place, silver medalist(s)	Sevgin Isik	Turkey	15:00.33

=== 4×100 metres relay ===
Pos	Athletes	Country	Results
1st place, gold medalist(s)	Richard Rubenis	Great Britain	43.85
1st place, gold medalist(s)	Will Macgee	Great Britain	43.85
1st place, gold medalist(s)	Jim Tipper	Great Britain	43.85
1st place, gold medalist(s)	Mark Collins	Great Britain	43.85
2nd place, silver medalist(s)	Riccardo Vaira	Italy	45.85
2nd place, silver medalist(s)	Giovambattist Pollicino	Italy	45.85
2nd place, silver medalist(s)	Emiliano Raspi	Italy	45.85
2nd place, silver medalist(s)	Stefano Tari	Italy	45.85
3rd place, bronze medalist(s)	Rifat Arabaci	Turkey	46.69
3rd place, bronze medalist(s)	Bunyam Bogatepe	Turkey	46.69
3rd place, bronze medalist(s)	Cuneyt Kucukbayraktar	Turkey	46.69
3rd place, bronze medalist(s)	Nuretdin Memur	Turkey	46.69

=== 4×400 metres relay ===
Pos	Athletes	Country	Results
1st place, gold medalist(s)	Emiliano Raspi	Italy	3:39.61
1st place, gold medalist(s)	Maurizio Pistillo	Italy	3:39.61
1st place, gold medalist(s)	Riccardo Vaira	Italy	3:39.61
1st place, gold medalist(s)	Giovambattist Pollicino	Italy	3:39.61
2nd place, silver medalist(s)	Richard Rubenis	Great Britain	3:42.67
2nd place, silver medalist(s)	Will Macgee	Great Britain	3:42.67
2nd place, silver medalist(s)	Mark Collins	Great Britain	3:42.67
2nd place, silver medalist(s)	Jim Tipper	Great Britain	3:42.67
3rd place, bronze medalist(s)	Joerg Schurath	Germany	3:46.55
3rd place, bronze medalist(s)	Michael Striewe	Germany	3:46.55
3rd place, bronze medalist(s)	Marcus Guenther	Germany	3:46.55
3rd place, bronze medalist(s)	Nils Benze	Germany	3:46.55

=== Marathon ===
Pos	Athlete	Country	Results
1st place, gold medalist(s)	Henadzi Zhauronak	Belarus	2:42:33
2nd place, silver medalist(s)	Michele Bruzzone	Italy	2:43:59
3rd place, bronze medalist(s)	Muharrem Ylmaz	Turkey	2:44:50

=== High jump ===
Pos	Athlete	Country	Results
1st place, gold medalist(s)	Igor Sukharev	Russia	1.81

=== Pole vault ===
Pos	Athlete	Country	Results
1st place, gold medalist(s)	Joerg Schurath	Germany	4.00
2nd place, silver medalist(s)	Kevin Byrne	Ireland	3.10

=== Long jump ===
Pos	Athlete	Country	Results
1st place, gold medalist(s)	Bakri Daroueche	France	7.29
2nd place, silver medalist(s)	Mattias Sunneborn	Sweden	7.07
3rd place, bronze medalist(s)	Maxime Mormin	France	6.68

=== Triple jump ===
Pos	Athlete	Country	Results
1st place, gold medalist(s)	Maxime Mormin	France	14.10
2nd place, silver medalist(s)	Stanislav Lepik	Russia	13.42
3rd place, bronze medalist(s)	Stephen Lake	Great Britain	11.88

=== Shot put ===
Pos	Athlete	Country	Results
1st place, gold medalist(s)	Gintas Degutis	Lithuania	15.41
2nd place, silver medalist(s)	Imvraim Fanarztis	Greece	14.86
3rd place, bronze medalist(s)	Emo Ranta	Finland	14.72

=== Discus throw ===
Pos	Athlete	Country	Results
1st place, gold medalist(s)	Mika Loikkanen	Finland	52.61
2nd place, silver medalist(s)	Alessio Donnini	Italy	45.00
3rd place, bronze medalist(s)	Huseyin Yilmaz	Turkey	42.21

=== Hammer throw ===
Pos	Athlete	Country	Results
1st place, gold medalist(s)	Mariusz Walczak	Poland	58.68
2nd place, silver medalist(s)	Walter De Wyngaert	Belgium	58.31
3rd place, bronze medalist(s)	Antonios Kontos	Germany	48.65

=== Javelin throw ===
Pos	Athlete	Country	Results
1st place, gold medalist(s)	Robert Tersek	Slovenia	58.80
2nd place, silver medalist(s)	Sami Salo	Finland	55.77
3rd place, bronze medalist(s)	Bert Beyer	Germany	52.70

=== Weight throw ===
Pos	Athlete	Country	Results
1st place, gold medalist(s)	Mariusz Walczak	Poland	19.18
2nd place, silver medalist(s)	Walter De Wyngaert	Belgium	16.92
3rd place, bronze medalist(s)	Jarkko Karstila	Finland	14.70

=== Throws pentathlon ===
Pos	Athlete	Country	Results
1st place, gold medalist(s)	Jarkko Karstila	Finland	3203
2nd place, silver medalist(s)	Sami Salo	Finland	3141
3rd place, bronze medalist(s)	Michael Galuschka	Germany	2996

=== Decathlon ===
Pos	Athlete	Country	Results
1st place, gold medalist(s)	Joerg Schurath	Germany	5757
2nd place, silver medalist(s)	Michael Striewe	Germany	5332
3rd place, bronze medalist(s)	Riccardo Vaira	Italy	5196

=== 5000 metre track race walk ===
Pos	Athlete	Country	Results
1st place, gold medalist(s)	Steffen Borsch	Germany	22:30.45
2nd place, silver medalist(s)	Normunds Ivzans	Latvia	22:52.21
3rd place, bronze medalist(s)	David Pueyo	Spain	23:38.68

=== 20000 metre road race walk ===
Pos	Athlete	Country	Results
1st place, gold medalist(s)	Normunds Ivzans	Latvia	1:42:48
2nd place, silver medalist(s)	Steffen Borsch	Germany	1:44:58
3rd place, bronze medalist(s)	Viacheslav Degtyarenko	Russia	1:46:06
