= M90 at the 2014 European Masters Athletics Championships =

The nineteenth European Masters Athletics Championships were held in Izmir, Turkey, from August 22–31, 2014. The European Masters Athletics Championships serve the division of the sport of athletics for people over 35 years of age, referred to as masters athletics.

== Results ==
=== 100 metres ===
Pos	Athlete	Country	Results
1st place, gold medalist(s)	Gerhard Herbst	Germany	23.84
2nd place, silver medalist(s)	Naci Yildizalp	Turkey	25.61
3rd place, bronze medalist(s)	Andrea Polychronopoulos	Greece	25.83

=== 200 metres ===
Pos	Athlete	Country	Results
1st place, gold medalist(s)	Gerhard Herbst	Germany	49.76
2nd place, silver medalist(s)	Andrea Polychronopoulos	Greece	1:00.72

=== Shot put ===
Pos	Athlete	Country	Results
1st place, gold medalist(s)	Gerhard Herbst	Germany	5.95

=== Discus throw ===
Pos	Athlete	Country	Results
1st place, gold medalist(s)	Gerhard Herbst	Germany	13.95
2nd place, silver medalist(s)	Axel Magnusson	Sweden	11.24

=== Javelin throw ===
Pos	Athlete	Country	Results
1st place, gold medalist(s)	Axel Magnusson	Sweden	13.54

=== Throws pentathlon ===
Pos	Athlete	Country	Results
1st place, gold medalist(s)	Axel Magnusson	Sweden	1910

=== 5000 metre track race walk ===
Pos	Athlete	Country	Results
1st place, gold medalist(s)	Gerhard Herbst	Germany	44:35.63
