= W65 at the 2014 European Masters Athletics Championships =

The nineteenth European Masters Athletics Championships were held in Izmir, Turkey, from August 22–31, 2014. The European Masters Athletics Championships serve the division of the sport of athletics for people over 35 years of age, referred to as masters athletics.

== Results ==
=== 100 metres ===
| Pos | Athlete | Country | Results |
|---|---|---|---|
| 1st place, gold medalist(s) | Moira West | Great Britain | 15.30 |
| 2nd place, silver medalist(s) | Ingrid Meier | Germany | 15.33 |
| 3rd place, bronze medalist(s) | Kristina Hanke | Germany | 16.19 |

=== 200 metres ===
| Pos | Athlete | Country | Results |
|---|---|---|---|
| 1st place, gold medalist(s) | Moira West | Great Britain | 31.90 |
| 2nd place, silver medalist(s) | Karmella Michlfeit | Austria | 34.95 |
| 3rd place, bronze medalist(s) | Ute Kappei | Germany | 38.11 |

=== 400 metres ===
| Pos | Athlete | Country | Results |
|---|---|---|---|
| 1st place, gold medalist(s) | Moira West | Great Britain | 1:14.00 |
| 2nd place, silver medalist(s) | Rosalind Tabor | Great Britain | 1:14.87 |
| 3rd place, bronze medalist(s) | Angela Copson | Great Britain | 1:15.02 |

=== 800 metres ===
| Pos | Athlete | Country | Results |
|---|---|---|---|
| 1st place, gold medalist(s) | Rosalind Tabor | Great Britain | 2:49.54 |
| 2nd place, silver medalist(s) | Angela Copson | Great Britain | 2:50.10 |
| 3rd place, bronze medalist(s) | Anne van Dijk | Netherlands | 2:51.79 |

=== 1500 metres ===
| Pos | Athlete | Country | Results |
|---|---|---|---|
| 1st place, gold medalist(s) | Angela Copson | Great Britain | 5:44.40 |
| 2nd place, silver medalist(s) | Rosalind Tabor | Great Britain | 5:46.96 |
| 3rd place, bronze medalist(s) | Anne van Dijk | Netherlands | 5:54.39 |

=== 5000 metres ===
| Pos | Athlete | Country | Results |
|---|---|---|---|
| 1st place, gold medalist(s) | Angela Copson | Great Britain | 21:32.51 |
| 2nd place, silver medalist(s) | Anne van Dijk | Netherlands | 21:56.14 |
| 3rd place, bronze medalist(s) | Olga Makarova | Russia | 22:54.78 |

=== 10000 metres ===
| Pos | Athlete | Country | Results |
|---|---|---|---|
| 1st place, gold medalist(s) | Angela Copson | Great Britain | 46:26.76 |
| 2nd place, silver medalist(s) | Emilia Vaquero | Spain | 46:32.22 |
| 3rd place, bronze medalist(s) | Anne van Dijk | Netherlands | 46:46.60 |

=== 80 metres hurdles ===
| Pos | Athlete | Country | Results |
|---|---|---|---|
| 1st place, gold medalist(s) | Margaritha Daehler-Stettler | Switzerland | 17.61 |
| 2nd place, silver medalist(s) | Patricia Oakes | Great Britain | 19.71 |
| 3rd place, bronze medalist(s) | Marja Maksimainen | Finland | 20.78 |

=== 4×100 metres relay ===
| Pos | Athletes | Country | Results |
|---|---|---|---|
| 1st place, gold medalist(s) | Lidiia Sorokina | Russia | 1:19.23 |
| 1st place, gold medalist(s) | Mariia Neustroeva | Russia | 1:19.23 |
| 1st place, gold medalist(s) | Valentina Zyryanova | Russia | 1:19.23 |
| 1st place, gold medalist(s) | Nelli Tomilova | Russia | 1:19.23 |

=== 4×400 metres relay ===
| Pos | Athletes | Country | Results |
|---|---|---|---|
| 1st place, gold medalist(s) | Moira West | Great Britain | 5:52.74 |
| 1st place, gold medalist(s) | Angela Copson | Great Britain | 5:52.74 |
| 1st place, gold medalist(s) | Patricia Stanley | Great Britain | 5:52.74 |
| 1st place, gold medalist(s) | Rosalind Tabor | Great Britain | 5:52.74 |
| 2nd place, silver medalist(s) | Lidiia Sorokina | Russia | 6:31.72 |
| 2nd place, silver medalist(s) | Mariia Neustroeva | Russia | 6:31.72 |
| 2nd place, silver medalist(s) | Valentina Zyryanova | Russia | 6:31.72 |
| 2nd place, silver medalist(s) | Nelli Tomilova | Russia | 6:31.72 |

=== Marathon ===
| Pos | Athlete | Country | Results |
|---|---|---|---|
| 1st place, gold medalist(s) | Emilia Vaquero | Spain | 3:34:37 |
| 2nd place, silver medalist(s) | Vera Nystad | Norway | 3:42:00 |
| 3rd place, bronze medalist(s) | Gabriele Rost-Brasholz | Germany | 4:16:38 |

=== High jump ===
| Pos | Athlete | Country | Results |
|---|---|---|---|
| 1st place, gold medalist(s) | Ingeborg Zorzi | Italy | 1.18 |
| 2nd place, silver medalist(s) | Helina Pihlaja | Finland | 1.12 |
| 2nd place, silver medalist(s) | Marjeta Cad | Slovenia | 1.12 |

=== Long jump ===
| Pos | Athlete | Country | Results |
|---|---|---|---|
| 1st place, gold medalist(s) | Ingrid Meier | Germany | 4.22 |
| 2nd place, silver medalist(s) | Kristina Hanke | Germany | 4.02 |
| 3rd place, bronze medalist(s) | Margaritha Daehler-Stettler | Switzerland | 3.76 |

=== Triple jump ===
| Pos | Athlete | Country | Results |
|---|---|---|---|
| 1st place, gold medalist(s) | Margaritha Daehler-Stettler | Switzerland | 7.59 |
| 2nd place, silver medalist(s) | Patricia Oakes | Great Britain | 6.83 |

=== Shot put ===
| Pos | Athlete | Country | Results |
|---|---|---|---|
| 1st place, gold medalist(s) | Birute Kersulienie | Lithuania | 10.38 |
| 2nd place, silver medalist(s) | Jarmila Klimesova | Czech Republic | 9.62 |
| 3rd place, bronze medalist(s) | Inge Faldager | Denmark | 9.16 |

=== Discus throw ===
| Pos | Athlete | Country | Results |
|---|---|---|---|
| 1st place, gold medalist(s) | Margarethe Tomanek | Belgium | 29.77 |
| 2nd place, silver medalist(s) | Inge Faldager | Denmark | 27.87 |
| 3rd place, bronze medalist(s) | Monika Hedderich | Germany | 24.42 |

=== Hammer throw ===
| Pos | Athlete | Country | Results |
|---|---|---|---|
| 1st place, gold medalist(s) | Inge Faldager | Denmark | 39.71 |
| 2nd place, silver medalist(s) | Eva Nohl | Germany | 36.84 |
| 3rd place, bronze medalist(s) | Margarethe Tomanek | Belgium | 35.45 |

=== Javelin throw ===
| Pos | Athlete | Country | Results |
|---|---|---|---|
| 1st place, gold medalist(s) | Jarmila Klimesova | Czech Republic | 31.14 |
| 2nd place, silver medalist(s) | Kristina Hanke | Germany | 28.13 |
| 3rd place, bronze medalist(s) | Ute Mackenroth | Germany | 24.90 |

=== Weight throw ===
| Pos | Athlete | Country | Results |
|---|---|---|---|
| 1st place, gold medalist(s) | Inge Faldager | Denmark | 14.81 |
| 2nd place, silver medalist(s) | Margarethe Tomanek | Belgium | 14.37 |
| 3rd place, bronze medalist(s) | Eva Nohl | Germany | 14.18 |

=== Throws pentathlon ===
| Pos | Athlete | Country | Results |
|---|---|---|---|
| 1st place, gold medalist(s) | Inge Faldager | Denmark | 4411 |
| 2nd place, silver medalist(s) | Margarethe Tomanek | Belgium | 4298 |
| 3rd place, bronze medalist(s) | Eva Nohl | Germany | 3976 |

=== Heptathlon ===
| Pos | Athlete | Country | Results |
|---|---|---|---|
| 1st place, gold medalist(s) | Ingeborg Zorzi | Italy | 5244 |
| 2nd place, silver medalist(s) | Margaritha Daehler-Stettler | Switzerland | 4784 |
| 3rd place, bronze medalist(s) | Eleni Gkouzia | Greece | 3206 |

=== 5000 metre track race walk ===
| Pos | Athlete | Country | Results |
|---|---|---|---|
| 1st place, gold medalist(s) | Antonina Tyshko | Ukraine | 32:12.56 |
| 2nd place, silver medalist(s) | Rita del Pinto | Italy | 34:34.16 |
| 3rd place, bronze medalist(s) | Heidrun Neidel | Germany | 34:43.62 |

=== 10000 metre road race walk ===
| Pos | Athlete | Country | Results |
|---|---|---|---|
| 1st place, gold medalist(s) | Antonina Tyshko | Ukraine | 1:08:11 |
| 2nd place, silver medalist(s) | Rita del Pinto | Italy | 1:13:02 |
| 3rd place, bronze medalist(s) | Heidrun Neidel | Germany | 1:14:15 |
