= W35 at the 2014 European Masters Athletics Championships =

The nineteenth European Masters Athletics Championships were held in Izmir, Turkey, from August 22–31, 2014. The European Masters Athletics Championships serve the division of the sport of athletics for people over 35 years of age, referred to as masters athletics.

== Results ==
=== 100 metres ===
Pos	Athlete	Country	Results
1st place, gold medalist(s)	Florina Marin	Romania	12.66
2nd place, silver medalist(s)	Malgorzata Gasowska	Poland	12.80
3rd place, bronze medalist(s)	Paula Owen	Great Britain	13.03

=== 200 metres ===
Pos	Athlete	Country	Results
1st place, gold medalist(s)	Florina Marin	Romania	25.57
2nd place, silver medalist(s)	Carolina Garcia	Spain	25.57
3rd place, bronze medalist(s)	Malgorzata Gasowska	Poland	26.06

=== 400 metres ===
Pos	Athlete	Country	Results
1st place, gold medalist(s)	Donatella Faedda	Italy	57.12
2nd place, silver medalist(s)	Olga Razzhigaeva	Russia	57.86
3rd place, bronze medalist(s)	Maria Sgromo	Italy	58.51

=== 800 metres ===
Pos	Athlete	Country	Results
1st place, gold medalist(s)	Ingrid Grutters	Netherlands	2:16.11
2nd place, silver medalist(s)	Katja Eravisto	Finland	2:16.57
3rd place, bronze medalist(s)	Maria Sgromo	Italy	2:17.17

=== 1500 metres ===
Pos	Athlete	Country	Results
1st place, gold medalist(s)	Joanne Locker	Great Britain	4:35.51
2nd place, silver medalist(s)	Katja Eravisto	Finland	4:37.16
3rd place, bronze medalist(s)	Vanda Ribeiro	Portugal	4:46.58

=== 5000 metres ===
Pos	Athlete	Country	Results
1st place, gold medalist(s)	Yvonne Brandecker	Germany	20:04.21
2nd place, silver medalist(s)	Selma Akgun	Turkey	23:00.52

=== 10000 metres ===
Pos	Athlete	Country	Results
1st place, gold medalist(s)	Maria Domenica Manchia	Italy	39:05.19
2nd place, silver medalist(s)	Sandra Marquez	Spain	42:11.96
3rd place, bronze medalist(s)	Elena Mizonova	Russia	47:01.39

=== 100 metres hurdles ===
Pos	Athlete	Country	Results
1st place, gold medalist(s)	Estriga Susana	Portugal	15.14
2nd place, silver medalist(s)	Mandy Schneider	Germany	16.26
3rd place, bronze medalist(s)	Irene Puchol	Spain	16.70

=== 400 metres hurdles ===
Pos	Athlete	Country	Results
1st place, gold medalist(s)	Estriga Susana	Portugal	1:06.40
2nd place, silver medalist(s)	Stephanie Hazard	France	1:06.81
3rd place, bronze medalist(s)	Paula Owen	Great Britain	1:07.15

=== 2000 metres steeplechase ===
Pos	Athlete	Country	Results
1st place, gold medalist(s)	Vanda Ribeiro	Portugal	7:16.67
2nd place, silver medalist(s)	Joanne Locker	Great Britain	7:17.87
3rd place, bronze medalist(s)	Yvonne Brandecker	Germany	7:58.59

=== 4×100 metres relay ===
Pos	Athletes	Country	Results
1st place, gold medalist(s)	Maria Sgromo	Italy	49.98
1st place, gold medalist(s)	Emanuela Baggiolini	Italy	49.98
1st place, gold medalist(s)	Cristina Sanulli	Italy	49.98
1st place, gold medalist(s)	Donatella Faedda	Italy	49.98
2nd place, silver medalist(s)	Emilia Paunica	Spain	50.52
2nd place, silver medalist(s)	Esther Colas	Spain	50.52
2nd place, silver medalist(s)	Elisabeth Ruz	Spain	50.52
2nd place, silver medalist(s)	Caroina Garcia	Spain	50.52
3rd place, bronze medalist(s)	Iuliia Iatsevich	Russia	53.86
3rd place, bronze medalist(s)	Nataliya Menshenina	Russia	53.86
3rd place, bronze medalist(s)	Svetlana Chekrygina	Russia	53.86
3rd place, bronze medalist(s)	Olga Razzhigaeva	Russia	53.86

=== 4×400 metres relay ===
Pos	Athletes	Country	Results
1st place, gold medalist(s)	Maria Sgromo	Italy	3:54.06
1st place, gold medalist(s)	Emanuela Baggiolini	Italy	3:54.06
1st place, gold medalist(s)	Cristina Sanulli	Italy	3:54.06
1st place, gold medalist(s)	Donatella Faedda	Italy	3:54.06
2nd place, silver medalist(s)	Emilia Paunica	Spain	4:07.26
2nd place, silver medalist(s)	Elisabeth Ruz	Spain	4:07.26
2nd place, silver medalist(s)	Esther Colas	Spain	4:07.26
2nd place, silver medalist(s)	Carolina Garcia	Spain	4:07.26
3rd place, bronze medalist(s)	Larisa Zhuk	Russia	4:23.71
3rd place, bronze medalist(s)	Svetlana Chekrygina	Russia	4:23.71
3rd place, bronze medalist(s)	Nataliya Menshenina	Russia	4:23.71
3rd place, bronze medalist(s)	Olga Razzhigaeva	Russia	4:23.71

=== High jump ===
Pos	Athlete	Country	Results
1st place, gold medalist(s)	Anja Wich-Heiter	Germany	1.63
2nd place, silver medalist(s)	Audrey Hustache	France	1.63
3rd place, bronze medalist(s)	Aysegul Baklaci	Turkey	1.55

=== Pole vault ===
Pos	Athlete	Country	Results
1st place, gold medalist(s)	Zuzana Sekova	Slovakia	3.00
2nd place, silver medalist(s)	Anouk Lilien	Belgium	2.70

=== Long jump ===
Pos	Athlete	Country	Results
1st place, gold medalist(s)	Helen Channon	Great Britain	5.36
2nd place, silver medalist(s)	Mandy Schneider	Germany	5.32
3rd place, bronze medalist(s)	Stephanie Hazard	France	5.29

=== Triple jump ===
Pos	Athlete	Country	Results
1st place, gold medalist(s)	Jaroslava Vaneckova	Czech Republic	11.80
2nd place, silver medalist(s)	Mandy Schneider	Germany	11.54
3rd place, bronze medalist(s)	Aysegul Baklaci	Turkey	11.44

=== Shot put ===
Pos	Athlete	Country	Results
1st place, gold medalist(s)	Eleanor Gatrell	Great Britain	15.17
2nd place, silver medalist(s)	Kirsi Koro	Finland	10.46
3rd place, bronze medalist(s)	Audrey Hustache	France	10.10

=== Discus throw ===
Pos	Athlete	Country	Results
1st place, gold medalist(s)	Eleanor Gatrell	Great Britain	42.84
2nd place, silver medalist(s)	Birgit Keller	Germany	40.14
3rd place, bronze medalist(s)	Kyriaki Singleton	Cyprus	39.88

=== Hammer throw ===
Pos	Athlete	Country	Results
1st place, gold medalist(s)	Kirsi Koro	Finland	51.88
2nd place, silver medalist(s)	Andrea Jenkins	Great Britain	48.64
3rd place, bronze medalist(s)	Birgit Keller	Germany	36.18

=== Javelin throw ===
Pos	Athlete	Country	Results
1st place, gold medalist(s)	Birgit Keller	Germany	36.76
2nd place, silver medalist(s)	Victoria Storey	Great Britain	32.93
3rd place, bronze medalist(s)	Audrey Hustache	France	31.56

=== Weight throw ===
Pos	Athlete	Country	Results
1st place, gold medalist(s)	Kirsi Koro	Finland	16.40
2nd place, silver medalist(s)	Andrea Jenkins	Great Britain	14.76
3rd place, bronze medalist(s)	Birgit Keller	Germany	11.62

=== Throws pentathlon ===
Pos	Athlete	Country	Results
1st place, gold medalist(s)	Kirsi Koro	Finland	3566
2nd place, silver medalist(s)	Andrea Jenkins	Great Britain	3366
3rd place, bronze medalist(s)	Birgit Keller	Germany	3185

=== Heptathlon ===
Pos	Athlete	Country	Results
1st place, gold medalist(s)	Olga Razzhigaeva	Russia	4460
2nd place, silver medalist(s)	Audrey Hustache	France	3980
3rd place, bronze medalist(s)	Maria-Cristina Marciuc	Romania	2923

=== 5000 metre track race walk ===
Pos	Athlete	Country	Results
1st place, gold medalist(s)	Brit Schroeter	Germany	26:03.72

=== 10000 metre road race walk ===
Pos	Athlete	Country	Results
1st place, gold medalist(s)	Brit Schroeter	Germany	59:20
