= W60 at the 2014 European Masters Athletics Championships =

The nineteenth European Masters Athletics Championships were held in Izmir, Turkey, from August 22–31, 2014. The European Masters Athletics Championships serve as the division of the sport of athletics for people over 35 years of age, referred to as masters athletics.

== Results ==
=== 100 metres ===
Pos	Athlete	Country	Results
1st place, gold medalist(s)	Helen Godsell	Great Britain	14.24
2nd place, silver medalist(s)	Ulrike Hiltscher	Germany	14.75
3rd place, bronze medalist(s)	Mariuccia Quilleri	Italy	15.40

=== 200 metres ===
Pos	Athlete	Country	Results
1st place, gold medalist(s)	Helen Godsell	Great Britain	29.55
2nd place, silver medalist(s)	Anna Micheletti	Italy	31.14
3rd place, bronze medalist(s)	Mariuccia Quilleri	Italy	32.18

=== 400 metres ===
Pos	Athlete	Country	Results
1st place, gold medalist(s)	Barbara Martinelli	Italy	1:00.58
2nd place, silver medalist(s)	Esther Colas	Spain	1:01.92
3rd place, bronze medalist(s)	Maria Dolores Jimenez	Spain	1:03.00

=== 800 metres ===
Pos	Athlete	Country	Results
1st place, gold medalist(s)	Caroline Marler	Great Britain	2:48.05
2nd place, silver medalist(s)	Ingerlise Villum Jensen	Denmark	2:51.68
3rd place, bronze medalist(s)	Anne Marie Rebray	France	2:54.92

=== 1500 metres ===
Pos	Athlete	Country	Results
1st place, gold medalist(s)	Anne Mare Rebray	France	5:47.23
2nd place, silver medalist(s)	Ingerlise Villum Jensen	Denmark	5:50.13
3rd place, bronze medalist(s)	Alison Bourgeois	Great Britain	5:55.06

=== 5000 metres ===
Pos	Athlete	Country	Results
1st place, gold medalist(s)	Alison Bourgeois	Great Britain	22:03.72
2nd place, silver medalist(s)	Eliisa Reijonen	Finland	22:37.27
3rd place, bronze medalist(s)	Elisabeth Gebauer	Germany	23:40.30

=== 10000 metres ===
Pos	Athlete	Country	Results
1st place, gold medalist(s)	Alison Bourgeois	Great Britain	46:48.81
2nd place, silver medalist(s)	Elisabeth Gebauer	Germany	49:49.40
3rd place, bronze medalist(s)	Irmgard Mann	Germany	51:59.04

=== 80 metres hurdles ===
Pos	Athlete	Country	Results
1st place, gold medalist(s)	Jocelyne Pater	Belgium	16.24
2nd place, silver medalist(s)	Fiona Argent	Great Britain	17.57
3rd place, bronze medalist(s)	Regina Machner	Germany	17.68

=== 300 metres hurdles ===
Pos	Athlete	Country	Results
1st place, gold medalist(s)	Ulrike Hiltscher	Germany	55.78
2nd place, silver medalist(s)	Marcela Pacrita	Romania	57.25
3rd place, bronze medalist(s)	Jocelyne Pater	Belgium	59.99

=== 2000 metres steeplechase ===
Pos	Athlete	Country	Results
1st place, gold medalist(s)	Eliisa Reijonen	Finland	9:16.95
2nd place, silver medalist(s)	Marcela Pacrita	Romania	9:20.84

=== 4×100 metres relay ===
Pos	Athletes	Country	Results
1st place, gold medalist(s)	Sue Dassie	Great Britain	1:00.07
1st place, gold medalist(s)	Sue Yeomans	Great Britain	1:00.07
1st place, gold medalist(s)	Caroline Marler	Great Britain	1:00.07
1st place, gold medalist(s)	Helen Godsell	Great Britain	1:00.07
2nd place, silver medalist(s)	Marianne Schumacher	Germany	1:05.58
2nd place, silver medalist(s)	Elisabeth Gebauer	Germany	1:05.58
2nd place, silver medalist(s)	Sigrid Schwarz	Germany	1:05.58
2nd place, silver medalist(s)	Ingrid Meier	Germany	1:05.58
3rd place, bronze medalist(s)	Elena Vereshchagina	Russia	1:15.33
3rd place, bronze medalist(s)	Galina Lapaeva	Russia	1:15.33
3rd place, bronze medalist(s)	Olga Kozyreva	Russia	1:15.33
3rd place, bronze medalist(s)	Valentina Kudriashova	Russia	1:15.33

=== 4×400 metres relay ===
Pos	Athletes	Country	Results
1st place, gold medalist(s)	Helen Godsell	Great Britain	5:18.21
1st place, gold medalist(s)	Lnda Ahmet	Great Britain	5:18.21
1st place, gold medalist(s)	Fiona Argent	Great Britain	5:18.21
1st place, gold medalist(s)	Caroline Marler	Great Britain	5:18.21
2nd place, silver medalist(s)	Elena Vereshchagina	Russia	6:08.20
2nd place, silver medalist(s)	Galina Lapaeva	Russia	6:08.20
2nd place, silver medalist(s)	Olga Kozyreva	Russia	6:08.20
2nd place, silver medalist(s)	Valentina Kudriashova	Russia	6:08.20

=== Marathon ===
Pos	Athlete	Country	Results
1st place, gold medalist(s)	Lilly Selma Jeppesen	Denmark	3:54:08
2nd place, silver medalist(s)	Boyka Ivanova	Bulgaria	5:20:10
3rd place, bronze medalist(s)	Claudine Anxionnat	France	5:21:44

=== High jump ===
Pos	Athlete	Country	Results
1st place, gold medalist(s)	Hilke Henschke	Germany	1.27
2nd place, silver medalist(s)	Sue Yeomans	Great Britain	1.27
3rd place, bronze medalist(s)	Stanka Prezelj	Slovenia	1.27

=== Pole vault ===
Pos	Athlete	Country	Results
1st place, gold medalist(s)	Sue Yeomans	Great Britain	2.60
2nd place, silver medalist(s)	Ute Ritte	Germany	2.50
3rd place, bronze medalist(s)	Sabina Plammer	Austria	1.90

=== Long jump ===
Pos	Athlete	Country	Results
1st place, gold medalist(s)	Ulrike Hiltscher	Germany	4.02
2nd place, silver medalist(s)	Sue Yeomans	Great Britain	4.02
3rd place, bronze medalist(s)	Ute Ritte	Germany	3.88

=== Triple jump ===
Pos	Athlete	Country	Results
1st place, gold medalist(s)	Linda Ahmet	Great Britain	7.26

=== Shot put ===
Pos	Athlete	Country	Results
1st place, gold medalist(s)	Hermine Bajare	Latvia	11.11
2nd place, silver medalist(s)	Anne Kirstine Jensen	Denmark	10.91
3rd place, bronze medalist(s)	Genovaite Kazlauskiene	Lithuania	10.67

=== Discus throw ===
Pos	Athlete	Country	Results
1st place, gold medalist(s)	Anne Kirstine Jensen	Denmark	32.50
2nd place, silver medalist(s)	Hermine Bajare	Latvia	29.79
3rd place, bronze medalist(s)	Claudia Vollert	Germany	27.25

=== Hammer throw ===
Pos	Athlete	Country	Results
1st place, gold medalist(s)	Magdolna Benes	Hungary	36.94
2nd place, silver medalist(s)	Jarmila Longauerova	Slovakia	35.27
3rd place, bronze medalist(s)	Sabina Plammer	Austria	33.90

=== Javelin throw ===
Pos	Athlete	Country	Results
1st place, gold medalist(s)	Anne Kirstine Jensen	Denmark	32.78
2nd place, silver medalist(s)	Marianne Schumacher	Germany	26.70
3rd place, bronze medalist(s)	Karin Schmitt	Germany	26.02

=== Weight throw ===
Pos	Athlete	Country	Results
1st place, gold medalist(s)	Magdolna Benes	Hungary	14.70
2nd place, silver medalist(s)	Anne Kirstine Jensen	Denmark	13.38
3rd place, bronze medalist(s)	Jarmila Longauerova	Slovakia	13.18

=== Throws pentathlon ===
Pos	Athlete	Country	Results
1st place, gold medalist(s)	Anne Kirstine Jensen	Denmark	4398
2nd place, silver medalist(s)	Claudia Vollert	Germany	3477
3rd place, bronze medalist(s)	Jarmila Longauerova	Slovakia	3365

=== Heptathlon ===
Pos	Athlete	Country	Results
1st place, gold medalist(s)	Ulrika Hiltscher	Germany	5458
2nd place, silver medalist(s)	Marcela Pacrita	Romania	4981
3rd place, bronze medalist(s)	Sigrid Schwarz	Germany	4578

=== 5000 metre track race walk ===
Pos	Athlete	Country	Results
1st place, gold medalist(s)	Maria Orlete Mendes	Portugal	31:24.38
2nd place, silver medalist(s)	Claudine Anxionnat	France	32:34.25
3rd place, bronze medalist(s)	Maria Jose Briz	Spain	32:52.97

=== 10000 metre road race walk ===
Pos	Athlete	Country	Results
1st place, gold medalist(s)	Maria Orlete Mendes	Portugal	1:07:08
2nd place, silver medalist(s)	Claudine Anxionnat	France	1:08:13
3rd place, bronze medalist(s)	Liudmila Nityagovskaya	Russia	1:09:21
