= W80 at the 2014 European Masters Athletics Championships =

The nineteenth European Masters Athletics Championships were held in Izmir, Turkey, from August 22–31, 2014. The European Masters Athletics Championships serve the division of the sport of athletics for people over 35 years of age, referred to as masters athletics.

== Results ==
=== 100 metres ===
Pos	Athlete	Country	Results
1st place, gold medalist(s)	Hildegund Buerkle	Germany	18.16
2nd place, silver medalist(s)	Emma Mazzenga	Italy	19.01
3rd place, bronze medalist(s)	Ase Nyland	Norway	19.80

=== 200 metres ===
Pos	Athlete	Country	Results
1st place, gold medalist(s)	Emma Mazzenga	Italy	39.12
2nd place, silver medalist(s)	Hildegund Buerkle	Germany	39.53
3rd place, bronze medalist(s)	Ase Nyland	Norway	41.86

=== 400 metres ===
Pos	Athlete	Country	Results
1st place, gold medalist(s)	Emma Mazzenga	Italy	1:33.31
2nd place, silver medalist(s)	Claudine Crippa	France	1:54.39

=== 1500 metres ===
Pos	Athlete	Country	Results
1st place, gold medalist(s)	Denise Leclerc	France	7:37.08

=== 5000 metres ===
Pos	Athlete	Country	Results
1st place, gold medalist(s)	Denise Leclerc	France	26:33.60 WR

=== High jump ===
Pos	Athlete	Country	Results
1st place, gold medalist(s)	Rosa Pedersen	Denmark	0.90

=== Long jump ===
Pos	Athlete	Country	Results
1st place, gold medalist(s)	Rosa Pedersen	Denmark	2.73
2nd place, silver medalist(s)	Rozka Stancheva	Bulgaria	2.67

=== Triple jump ===
Pos	Athlete	Country	Results
1st place, gold medalist(s)	Rozka Stancheva	Bulgaria	5.57

=== Shot put ===
Pos	Athlete	Country	Results
1st place, gold medalist(s)	Christa Winkelmann	Germany	6.75
2nd place, silver medalist(s)	Annemarie Scholten	Germany	6.10

=== Discus throw ===
Pos	Athlete	Country	Results
1st place, gold medalist(s)	Christa Winkelmann	Germany	15.84
2nd place, silver medalist(s)	Ruth Baumann	Germany	15.02

=== Hammer throw ===
Pos	Athlete	Country	Results
1st place, gold medalist(s)	Christa Winkelmann	Germany	25.26
2nd place, silver medalist(s)	Eila Mikola	Finland	23.00
3rd place, bronze medalist(s)	Annemarie Scholten	Germany	22.02

=== Javelin throw ===
Pos	Athlete	Country	Results
1st place, gold medalist(s)	Christa Winkelmann	Germany	16.37
2nd place, silver medalist(s)	Rosa Pedersen	Denmark	15.91

=== Weight throw ===
Pos	Athlete	Country	Results
1st place, gold medalist(s)	Christa Winkelmann	Germany	8.80
2nd place, silver medalist(s)	Annemarie Scholten	Germany	7.90

=== Throws pentathlon ===
Pos	Athlete	Country	Results
1st place, gold medalist(s)	Christa Winkelmann	Germany	3814
2nd place, silver medalist(s)	Eila Mikola	Finland	3574
3rd place, bronze medalist(s)	Annemarie Scholten	Germany	3082
