= Ian Richards (race walker) =

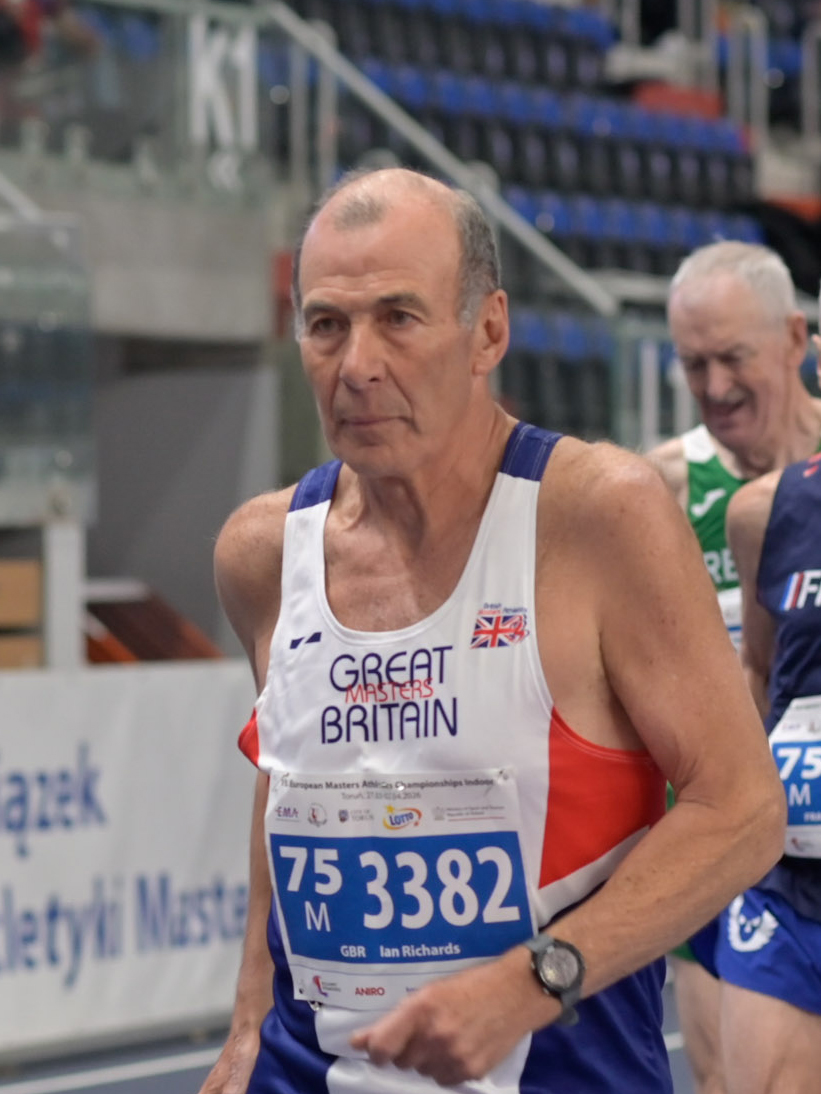
- Ian Richards (2026)

Personal information
- Nationality: British (English)
- Born: April 12, 1948 (age 77) Stockport, England
- Height: 173 cm (5 ft 8 in)
- Weight: 63 kg (139 lb)

Sport
- Sport: Athletics
- Event: Racewalking
- Club: Coventry Godiva Harriers

Ian William Richards (born April 12, 1948) is a racewalker from England, who represented Great Britain at the 1980 Summer Olympics.

== Biography ==
Richards finished third behind Steve Barry in the 3,000m walk event at the 1980 AAA Championships. Shortly afterwards at the 1980 Olympics Games in Moscow, he represented Great Britain and finished in 11th place in the men's 50 km race, clocking 4:22.57. Two years after the Olympics Richards retired from competition, before returning to competition at the age of 60.

At the 2013 World Masters Athletics Championships in Porto Alegre, Brazil, Richards set a world record in the M65 5,000 meter racewalk (the event for men aged 65–69 years), with a time of 24:13.10, and was second in the M65 10,000 meter racewalk.

Richards won the 5,000 meter racewalk at the 2015 World Masters Athletics Championships. He competed at European and World Masters Championships in 2017 (at Aarhus and Daegue) and 2018 (at Alicante and Malaga).

In 2019, Richards broke the M70 world record (the record for men aged 70–74 years) in the 3,000 meter racewalk at the World Masters Indoor Championships in Toruń, Poland. Later that year, he was named Sports Personality of the Year at the Sussex Sports Awards, for his successes in the preceding year and for being an inspiration to other athletes in Sussex.
