= W85 at the 2014 European Masters Athletics Championships =

The nineteenth European Masters Athletics Championships were held in Izmir, Turkey, from August 22–31, 2014. The European Masters Athletics Championships serve the division of the sport of athletics for people over 35 years of age, referred to as masters athletics.

== Results ==
=== 400 metres ===
Pos	Athlete	Country	Results
1st place, gold medalist(s)	Xenia Nicolaev	Moldova	3:29.69

=== Shot put ===
Pos	Athlete	Country	Results
1st place, gold medalist(s)	Rachel Hanssens	Belgium	7.86

=== Discus throw ===
Pos	Athlete	Country	Results
1st place, gold medalist(s)	Rachel Hanssens	Belgium	19.49 WR
2nd place, silver medalist(s)	Hilja Bakhoff	Estonia	15.24
3rd place, bronze medalist(s)	Anna Flaibani	Italy	11.79

=== Hammer throw ===
Pos	Athlete	Country	Results
1st place, gold medalist(s)	Rachel Hanssens	Belgium	26.80 WR
2nd place, silver medalist(s)	Anna Flaibani	Italy	21.69
3rd place, bronze medalist(s)	Hilja Bakhoff	Estonia	18.72

=== Javelin throw ===
Pos	Athlete	Country	Results
1st place, gold medalist(s)	Rachel Hanssens	Belgium	18.47 WR

=== Weight throw ===
Pos	Athlete	Country	Results
1st place, gold medalist(s)	Rachel Hanssens	Belgium	9.23
2nd place, silver medalist(s)	Hilja Bakhoff	Estonia	8.07

=== Throws pentathlon ===
Pos	Athlete	Country	Results
1st place, gold medalist(s)	Rachel Hanssens	Belgium	4846 WR
2nd place, silver medalist(s)	Hilja Bakhoff	Estonia	3613
3rd place, bronze medalist(s)	Anna Flaibani	Italy	3261
