= W45 at the 2014 European Masters Athletics Championships =

The nineteenth European Masters Athletics Championships were held in Izmir, Turkey, from August 22–31, 2014. The European Masters Athletics Championships serve the division of the sport of athletics for people over 35 years of age, referred to as masters athletics.

== Results ==
=== 100 metres ===
Pos	Athlete	Country	Results
1st place, gold medalist(s)	Maria Ruggeri	Italy	12.84
2nd place, silver medalist(s)	Renata Novosel	Croatia	13.47
3rd place, bronze medalist(s)	Marta Roccamo	Italy	13.53

=== 200 metres ===
Pos	Athlete	Country	Results
1st place, gold medalist(s)	Maria Ruggeri	Italy	25.88
2nd place, silver medalist(s)	Eva Guenther-Graeff	Germany	26.93
3rd place, bronze medalist(s)	Dace Faitusa	Latvia	27.44

=== 400 metres ===
Pos	Athlete	Country	Results
1st place, gold medalist(s)	Barbara Martinelli	Italy	1:00.58
2nd place, silver medalist(s)	Esther Colas	Spain	1:01.92
3rd place, bronze medalist(s)	Maria Dolores Jimenez	Spain	1:03.00

=== 800 metres ===
Pos	Athlete	Country	Results
1st place, gold medalist(s)	Maria Dolores Jimenez	Spain	2:19.05
2nd place, silver medalist(s)	Gigliola Giorgi	Italy	2:24.48
3rd place, bronze medalist(s)	Marina Patlasova	Russia	2:24.76

=== 1500 metres ===
Pos	Athlete	Country	Results
1st place, gold medalist(s)	Maria Dolores Jimenez	Spain	4:45.77
2nd place, silver medalist(s)	Bernadine Pritchett	Great Britain	4:47.21
3rd place, bronze medalist(s)	Marina Patlasova	Russia	5:01.71

=== 5000 metres ===
Pos	Athlete	Country	Results
1st place, gold medalist(s)	Svetlana Kolyaskina	Russia	21:01.01
2nd place, silver medalist(s)	Anne-Catherine Vouilloz	Switzerland	21:22.34
3rd place, bronze medalist(s)	Ana Vieira	Portugal	22:55.44

=== 10000 metres ===
Pos	Athlete	Country	Results
1st place, gold medalist(s)	Svetlana Kolyaskina	Russia	44:39.79
2nd place, silver medalist(s)	Anne-Catherine Vouilloz	Switzerland	44:42.24
3rd place, bronze medalist(s)	Aija Rogale	Latvia	44:54.60

=== 80 metres hurdles ===
Pos	Athlete	Country	Results
1st place, gold medalist(s)	Oxana Doronkina	Russia	12.45
2nd place, silver medalist(s)	Anja Deckers	Germany	13.91
3rd place, bronze medalist(s)	Lolita Royer Nack	France	13.92

=== 400 metres hurdles ===
Pos	Athlete	Country	Results
1st place, gold medalist(s)	Anja Deckers	Germany	1:13.17
2nd place, silver medalist(s)	Giusy Lacava	Italy	1:15.28
3rd place, bronze medalist(s)	Kornelia Wrzesniok	Germany	1:18.09

=== 2000 metres steeplechase ===
Pos	Athlete	Country	Results
1st place, gold medalist(s)	Maria Dolores Jimenez	Spain	7:26.78
2nd place, silver medalist(s)	Galina Kiseleva	Russia	8:27.56
3rd place, bronze medalist(s)	Krasimira Chahova	Bulgaria	8:28.73

=== 4×100 metres relay ===
Pos	Athletes	Country	Results
1st place, gold medalist(s)	Vittoriana Gariboldi	Italy	52.06
1st place, gold medalist(s)	Marta Roccamo	Italy	52.06
1st place, gold medalist(s)	Gigliola Giorgi	Italy	52.06
1st place, gold medalist(s)	Maria Ruggeri	Italy	52.06
2nd place, silver medalist(s)	Oxana Doronkina	Russia	54.14
2nd place, silver medalist(s)	Tamara Savidova	Russia	54.14
2nd place, silver medalist(s)	Marina Patlasova	Russia	54.14
2nd place, silver medalist(s)	Nina Arnst	Russia	54.14
3rd place, bronze medalist(s)	Dorit Stehr	Germany	56.94
3rd place, bronze medalist(s)	Kornelia Wrzesniok	Germany	56.94
3rd place, bronze medalist(s)	Anja Doerks	Germany	56.94
3rd place, bronze medalist(s)	Anja Deckers	Germany	56.94

=== 4×400 metres relay ===
Pos	Athletes	Country	Results
1st place, gold medalist(s)	Marina Patlasova	Russia	4:21.48
1st place, gold medalist(s)	Galina Kiseleva	Russia	4:21.48
1st place, gold medalist(s)	Tamara Savidova	Russia	4:21.48
1st place, gold medalist(s)	Nina Arnst	Russia	4:21.48
2nd place, silver medalist(s)	Annette Koegst	Germany	4:30.39
2nd place, silver medalist(s)	Anja Doerks	Germany	4:30.39
2nd place, silver medalist(s)	Anja Deckers	Germany	4:30.39
2nd place, silver medalist(s)	Kornelia Wrzesniok	Germany	4:30.39
3rd place, bronze medalist(s)	Clarisa Alcaire	Spain	5:07.76
3rd place, bronze medalist(s)	Dorotea Sevilla	Spain	5:07.76
3rd place, bronze medalist(s)	Azucena Lopez	Spain	5:07.76
3rd place, bronze medalist(s)	Maria Dolores Jimenez	Spain	5:07.76

=== Marathon ===
Pos	Athlete	Country	Results
1st place, gold medalist(s)	Ulrike Mayer-Tancic	Germany	3:20:31
2nd place, silver medalist(s)	Malina Vatskicheva	Bulgaria	3:54:41
3rd place, bronze medalist(s)	Ana Vieira	Poland	4:01:10

=== High jump ===
Pos	Athlete	Country	Results
1st place, gold medalist(s)	Lolita Royer Nack	France	1.54
2nd place, silver medalist(s)	Aycan Kurtcan	Turkey	1.51
3rd place, bronze medalist(s)	Daniele Denisty	Belgium	1.45

=== Pole vault ===
Pos	Athlete	Country	Results
1st place, gold medalist(s)	Irie Hill	Great Britain	3.30
2nd place, silver medalist(s)	Valentyna Krepkina	Ukraine	2.60

=== Long jump ===
Pos	Athlete	Country	Results
1st place, gold medalist(s)	Renata Novosel	Croatia	5.39
2nd place, silver medalist(s)	Oxana Doronkina	Russia	5.21
3rd place, bronze medalist(s)	Valentyna Krepkina	Ukraine	5.01

=== Triple jump ===
Pos	Athlete	Country	Results
1st place, gold medalist(s)	Ana Mrcic	Croatia	10.60
2nd place, silver medalist(s)	Valentyna Krepkina	Ukraine	10.59
3rd place, bronze medalist(s)	Kirsi Spoof-Tuomi	Finland	10.26

=== Shot put ===
Pos	Athlete	Country	Results
1st place, gold medalist(s)	Ellen Weller	Germany	10.84
2nd place, silver medalist(s)	Lena Kroon	Sweden	6.94
3rd place, bronze medalist(s)	Lesley Richardson	Great Britain	6.88

=== Discus throw ===
Pos	Athlete	Country	Results
1st place, gold medalist(s)	Silke Stolt	Germany	36.49
2nd place, silver medalist(s)	Ellen Weller	Germany	34.52
3rd place, bronze medalist(s)	Lilian Sepp	Estonia	29.12

=== Hammer throw ===
Pos	Athlete	Country	Results
1st place, gold medalist(s)	Gonny Mik	Netherlands	50.23
2nd place, silver medalist(s)	Mireille Kosmala	Luxembourg	40.54
3rd place, bronze medalist(s)	Lilian Sepp	Estonia	38.89

=== Javelin throw ===
Pos	Athlete	Country	Results
1st place, gold medalist(s)	Efi Karatopouzi	Greece	35.48
2nd place, silver medalist(s)	Ina Adam	Germany	33.82
3rd place, bronze medalist(s)	Daniela Denisty	Belgium	30.40

=== Weight throw ===
Pos	Athlete	Country	Results
1st place, gold medalist(s)	Gonny Mik	Netherlands	14.98
2nd place, silver medalist(s)	Mireille Kosmala	Luxembourg	12.68
3rd place, bronze medalist(s)	Kathleen de Wolf	Belgium	11.66

=== Throws pentathlon ===
Pos	Athlete	Country	Results
1st place, gold medalist(s)	Gonny Mik	Netherlands	4122
2nd place, silver medalist(s)	Ellen Weller	Germany	3428
3rd place, bronze medalist(s)	Kathleen de Wolf	Belgium	3047

=== Heptathlon ===
Pos	Athlete	Country	Results
1st place, gold medalist(s)	Daniele Denisty	Belgium	5043
2nd place, silver medalist(s)	Geraldine Finegan	Ireland	4806
3rd place, bronze medalist(s)	Kornelia Wrzesniok	Germany	4262

=== 5000 metre track race walk ===
Pos	Athlete	Country	Results
1st place, gold medalist(s)	Ellinor Hogrell	Sweden	28:25.03
2nd place, silver medalist(s)	Roberta Mombelli	Italy	28:35.64
3rd place, bronze medalist(s)	Andreja Poklar	Slovenia	30:47.96

=== 10000 metre road race walk ===
Pos	Athlete	Country	Results
1st place, gold medalist(s)	Roberta Mombelli	Italy	59:48
2nd place, silver medalist(s)	Ellinor Hogrell	Sweden	1:01:32
3rd place, bronze medalist(s)	Aija Rogale	Latvia	1:04:15
