= W90 at the 2014 European Masters Athletics Championships =

The nineteenth European Masters Athletics Championships were held in Izmir, Turkey, from August 22–31, 2014. The European Masters Athletics Championships serve the division of the sport of athletics for people over 35 years of age, referred to as masters athletics.

== Results ==
=== Shot put ===
Pos	Athlete	Country	Results
1st place, gold medalist(s)	Nora Kutti	Estonia	5.17
2nd place, silver medalist(s)	Elfriede Fuchs	Austria	3.61

=== Discus throw ===
Pos	Athlete	Country	Results
1st place, gold medalist(s)	Nora Kutti	Estonia	13.45

=== Hammer throw ===
Pos	Athlete	Country	Results
1st place, gold medalist(s)	Nora Kutti	Estonia	13.83

=== Javelin throw ===
Pos	Athlete	Country	Results
1st place, gold medalist(s)	Nora Kutti	Estonia	12.60

=== Weight throw ===
Pos	Athlete	Country	Results
1st place, gold medalist(s)	Nora Kutti	Estonia	6.75

=== Throws pentathlon ===
Pos	Athlete	Country	Results
1st place, gold medalist(s)	Nora Kutti	Estonia	3843
