= W75 at the 2014 European Masters Athletics Championships =

The nineteenth European Masters Athletics Championships were held in Izmir, Turkey, from August 22–31, 2014. The European Masters Athletics Championships serve the division of the sport of athletics for people over 35 years of age, referred to as masters athletics.

== Results ==
=== 100 metres ===
Pos	Athlete	Country	Results
1st place, gold medalist(s)	Irma Nieme-Pynttari	Finland	18.93
2nd place, silver medalist(s)	Marjatta Taipale	Finland	18.93
3rd place, bronze medalist(s)	Sonja Nilsson	Sweden	19.93

=== 200 metres ===
Pos	Athlete	Country	Results
1st place, gold medalist(s)	Marjatta Taipale	Finland	39.85
2nd place, silver medalist(s)	Lidia Sorokina	Russia	41.55
3rd place, bronze medalist(s)	Astrid Nilsson	Sweden	42.10

=== 400 metres ===
Pos	Athlete	Country	Results
1st place, gold medalist(s)	Lydia Ritter	Germany	1:31.36
2nd place, silver medalist(s)	Lidiia Sorokina	Russia	1:41.23
3rd place, bronze medalist(s)	Jeanne Coker	Great Britain	2:07.49

=== 800 metres ===
Pos	Athlete	Country	Results
1st place, gold medalist(s)	Lydia Ritter	Germany	3:26.46

=== 1500 metres ===
Pos	Athlete	Country	Results
1st place, gold medalist(s)	Lydia Ritter	Germany	7:00.48

=== 5000 metres ===
Pos	Athlete	Country	Results
1st place, gold medalist(s)	Zofia Turosz	Poland	29:52.84

=== 200 metres hurdles ===
Pos	Athlete	Country	Results
1st place, gold medalist(s)	Renate Schaden	Austria	45.64

=== 4×100 metres relay ===
Pos	Athletes	Country	Results
1st place, gold medalist(s)	Hildegund Buerkle	Germany	1:15.56
1st place, gold medalist(s)	Ingeborg Franke	Germany	1:15.56
1st place, gold medalist(s)	Brita Kiesheyer	Germany	1:15.56
1st place, gold medalist(s)	Lydia Ritter	Germany	1:15.56

=== High jump ===
Pos	Athlete	Country	Results
1st place, gold medalist(s)	Marjatta Taipale	Finland	1.02
2nd place, silver medalist(s)	Brita Kiesheyer	Germany	1.02
3rd place, bronze medalist(s)	Giulia Lucia Perugini	Italy	0.99

=== Long jump ===
Pos	Athlete	Country	Results
1st place, gold medalist(s)	Marjatta Taipale	Finland	3.22
2nd place, silver medalist(s)	Renate Schaden	Austria	2.97
3rd place, bronze medalist(s)	Brita Kiesheyer	Germany	2.84

=== Shot put ===
Pos	Athlete	Country	Results
1st place, gold medalist(s)	Brunhilde Ponzelar	Germany	9.19
2nd place, silver medalist(s)	Leile Kaas	Estonia	8.07
3rd place, bronze medalist(s)	Ingrid Junge	Germany	6.74

=== Discus throw ===
Pos	Athlete	Country	Results
1st place, gold medalist(s)	Brunhilde Ponzelar	Germany	22.54

=== Hammer throw ===
Pos	Athlete	Country	Results
1st place, gold medalist(s)	Irma Nieme-Pynttari	Finland	31.00
2nd place, silver medalist(s)	Brunhilde Ponzelar	Germany	27.29
3rd place, bronze medalist(s)	Brigitte Schmidt	Germany	25.25

=== Javelin throw ===
Pos	Athlete	Country	Results
1st place, gold medalist(s)	Brunhilde Ponzelar	Germany	19.10
2nd place, silver medalist(s)	Angela Minculescu	Romania	17.16

=== Weight throw ===
Pos	Athlete	Country	Results
1st place, gold medalist(s)	Brunhilde Ponzelar	Germany	10.52
2nd place, silver medalist(s)	Brigitte Schmidt	Germany	10.43
3rd place, bronze medalist(s)	Brita Kiesheyer	Germany	9.64

=== Throws pentathlon ===
Pos	Athlete	Country	Results
1st place, gold medalist(s)	Brunhilde Ponzelar	Germany	4039
2nd place, silver medalist(s)	Brita Kiesheyer	Germany	3463
3rd place, bronze medalist(s)	Irma Nieme-Pynttari	Finland	3287

=== Heptathlon ===
Pos	Athlete	Country	Results
1st place, gold medalist(s)	Brita Kiesheyer	Germany	3685
2nd place, silver medalist(s)	Dorothy Mclennan	Ireland	1946

=== 5000 metre track race walk ===
Pos	Athlete	Country	Results
1st place, gold medalist(s)	Helga Draeger	Germany	40:18.82
2nd place, silver medalist(s)	Janina Fijalkowska	Poland	41:11.47

=== 10000 metre road race walk ===
Pos	Athlete	Country	Results
1st place, gold medalist(s)	Helga Draeger	Germany	1:24:12
2nd place, silver medalist(s)	Janina Fijalkowska	Poland	1:25:09
