= W55 at the 2014 European Masters Athletics Championships =

The nineteenth European Masters Athletics Championships were held in Izmir, Turkey, from August 22–31, 2014. The European Masters Athletics Championships serve the division of the sport of athletics for people over 35 years of age, referred to as masters athletics.

== Results ==
=== 100 metres ===
Pos	Athlete	Country	Results
1st place, gold medalist(s)	Averil Mcclelland	Great Britain	13.93
2nd place, silver medalist(s)	Carole Filer	Great Britain	14.38
3rd place, bronze medalist(s)	Joan Trimble	Great Britain	14.40

=== 200 metres ===
Pos	Athlete	Country	Results
1st place, gold medalist(s)	Averil Mcclelland	Great Britain	28.60
2nd place, silver medalist(s)	Edith Caux	France	29.99
3rd place, bronze medalist(s)	Sonja Oost	Netherlands	30.25

=== 400 metres ===
Pos	Athlete	Country	Results
1st place, gold medalist(s)	Anny Undheim	Norway	1:06.98
2nd place, silver medalist(s)	Jane Horder	Great Britain	1:07.44
3rd place, bronze medalist(s)	Edith Caux	France	1:08.74

=== 800 metres ===
Pos	Athlete	Country	Results
1st place, gold medalist(s)	Lilly Wizen	Sweden	2:44.61
2nd place, silver medalist(s)	Angelika Ehebrecht	Germany	2:45.00
3rd place, bronze medalist(s)	Irina Chernykh	Russia	2:45.61

=== 1500 metres ===
Pos	Athlete	Country	Results
1st place, gold medalist(s)	Dorotea Sevilla	Spain	5:40.74
2nd place, silver medalist(s)	Lilly Wizen	Sweden	5:42.14
3rd place, bronze medalist(s)	Cinzia Barletta	Italy	5:53.19

=== 5000 metres ===
Pos	Athlete	Country	Results
1st place, gold medalist(s)	Dorotea Sevilla	Turkey	21:50.55
2nd place, silver medalist(s)	Cinzia Barletta	Italy	22:10.61
3rd place, bronze medalist(s)	Eser Handan	Turkey	22:29.66

=== 10000 metres ===
Pos	Athlete	Country	Results
1st place, gold medalist(s)	Elisaveta Kanaeva	Russia	43:28.43
2nd place, silver medalist(s)	Irina Pletneva	Russia	49:41.11

=== 80 metres hurdles ===
Pos	Athlete	Country	Results
1st place, gold medalist(s)	Jane Horder	Great Britain	13.13
2nd place, silver medalist(s)	Carole Filer	Great Britain	13.88
3rd place, bronze medalist(s)	Ruth Raaflaub	Switzerland	14.02

=== 300 metres hurdles ===
Pos	Athlete	Country	Results
1st place, gold medalist(s)	Jane Horder	Great Britain	49.58
2nd place, silver medalist(s)	Carole Filer	Great Britain	54.65
3rd place, bronze medalist(s)	Wiebke Baseda	Germany	55.42

=== 4×100 metres relay ===
Pos	Athletes	Country	Results
1st place, gold medalist(s)	Joan Trimble	Great Britain	54.95
1st place, gold medalist(s)	Carole Filer	Great Britain	54.95
1st place, gold medalist(s)	Jane Horder	Great Britain	54.95
1st place, gold medalist(s)	Averil Mcclelland	Great Britain	54.95
2nd place, silver medalist(s)	Mariuccia Quilleri	Italy	58.87
2nd place, silver medalist(s)	Anna Micheletti	Italy	58.87
2nd place, silver medalist(s)	Nadia Ruggieri	Italy	58.87
2nd place, silver medalist(s)	Daniela Fassi	Italy	58.87

=== 4×400 metres relay ===
Pos	Athletes	Country	Results
1st place, gold medalist(s)	Carole Filer	Great Britain	4:52.70
1st place, gold medalist(s)	Averil Mcclelland	Great Britain	4:52.70
1st place, gold medalist(s)	Joan Trimble	Great Britain	4:52.70
1st place, gold medalist(s)	Jane Horder	Great Britain	4:52.70
2nd place, silver medalist(s)	Daniela Fassi	Italy	5:12.89
2nd place, silver medalist(s)	Cinzia Barletta	Italy	5:12.89
2nd place, silver medalist(s)	Nadia Ruggieri	Italy	5:12.89
2nd place, silver medalist(s)	Anna Micheletti	Italy	5:12.89
3rd place, bronze medalist(s)	Elisabeth Gebauer	Germany	5:32.90
3rd place, bronze medalist(s)	Uta Kappei	Germany	5:32.90
3rd place, bronze medalist(s)	Sigrid Schwarz	Germany	5:32.90
3rd place, bronze medalist(s)	Wiebke Baseda	Germany	5:32.90

=== Marathon ===
Pos	Athlete	Country	Results
1st place, gold medalist(s)	Elisaveta Kanaeva	Russia	3:35:59
2nd place, silver medalist(s)	Angelika Hofmann	Germany	3:38:13
3rd place, bronze medalist(s)	Paivi Naumanen	Finland	3:43:16

=== High jump ===
Pos	Athlete	Country	Results
1st place, gold medalist(s)	Carole Filer	Great Britain	1.35
2nd place, silver medalist(s)	Wiebke Baseda	Germany	1.32
3rd place, bronze medalist(s)	Multane Marija	Latvia	1.32

=== Pole vault ===
Pos	Athlete	Country	Results
1st place, gold medalist(s)	Teresa Eades	Great Britain	2.50
2nd place, silver medalist(s)	Debbie Singleton	Great Britain	2.10

=== Long jump ===
Pos	Athlete	Country	Results
1st place, gold medalist(s)	Carole Filer	Great Britain	4.75
2nd place, silver medalist(s)	Averil Mcclelland	Great Britain	4.51
3rd place, bronze medalist(s)	Ruth Raaflaub	Switzerland	4.37

=== Triple jump ===
Pos	Athlete	Country	Results
1st place, gold medalist(s)	Ruth Raaflaub	Switzerland	9.41
2nd place, silver medalist(s)	Teresa Eades	Great Britain	9.29
3rd place, bronze medalist(s)	Anna-Liisa Salminen	Finland	9.29

=== Shot put ===
Pos	Athlete	Country	Results
1st place, gold medalist(s)	Alexandra Marghieva	Moldova	12.53
2nd place, silver medalist(s)	Maria Cotolupenco	Moldova	11.56
3rd place, bronze medalist(s)	Carola Petersen	Germany	11.04

=== Discus throw ===
Pos	Athlete	Country	Results
1st place, gold medalist(s)	Alexandra Marghieva	Moldova	35.46
2nd place, silver medalist(s)	Maria Cotolupenco	Moldova	35.25
3rd place, bronze medalist(s)	Claire Cameron	Great Britain	31.53

=== Hammer throw ===
Pos	Athlete	Country	Results
1st place, gold medalist(s)	Magy Duss	Switzerland	40.00
2nd place, silver medalist(s)	Liisa Makitorma	Finland	36.49
3rd place, bronze medalist(s)	Gunnevi Magnusson	Sweden	36.33

=== Javelin throw ===
Pos	Athlete	Country	Results
1st place, gold medalist(s)	Wiebke Baseda	Germany	28.72
2nd place, silver medalist(s)	Tamilla Bunyadova	Azerbaijan	28.56
3rd place, bronze medalist(s)	Ana Martinho	Portugal	28.22

=== Weight throw ===
Pos	Athlete	Country	Results
1st place, gold medalist(s)	Magy Duss	Switzerland	12.91
2nd place, silver medalist(s)	Gunnevi Magnusson	Sweden	12.38
3rd place, bronze medalist(s)	Siv Karlstrom	Finland	11.78

=== Throws pentathlon ===
Pos	Athlete	Country	Results
1st place, gold medalist(s)	Liisa Makitorma	Finland	3753
2nd place, silver medalist(s)	Magy Duss	Switzerland	3645
3rd place, bronze medalist(s)	Carola Petersen	Germany	3378

=== Heptathlon ===
Pos	Athlete	Country	Results
1st place, gold medalist(s)	Wiebke Baseda	Germany	5216
2nd place, silver medalist(s)	Anna Matusova	Slovakia	3755
3rd place, bronze medalist(s)	Hazel Barker	Great Britain	3524

=== 5000 metre track race walk ===
Pos	Athlete	Country	Results
1st place, gold medalist(s)	Daniele Ricciutelli	Italy	28:51.55
2nd place, silver medalist(s)	Natalia Marcenco	Italy	31:02.21
3rd place, bronze medalist(s)	Maria Paola Formiconi	Italy	31:15.67

=== 10000 metre road race walk ===
Pos	Athlete	Country	Results
1st place, gold medalist(s)	Daniela Ricciutelli	Italy	1:03:59
2nd place, silver medalist(s)	Maria Paola Formiconi	Italy	1:04:06
3rd place, bronze medalist(s)	Natalia Marcenco	Italy	1:05:39
