= W50 at the 2014 European Masters Athletics Championships =

The nineteenth European Masters Athletics Championships were held in Izmir, Turkey, from August 22–31, 2014. The European Masters Athletics Championships serve the division of the sport of athletics for people over 35 years of age, referred to as masters athletics.

== Results ==
=== 100 metres ===
Pos	Athlete	Country	Results
1st place, gold medalist(s)	Nicole Alexis	France	13.12
2nd place, silver medalist(s)	Jana Frabsova	Czech Republic	13.54
3rd place, bronze medalist(s)	Birgit Burzlaff	Germany	13.70

=== 200 metres ===
Pos	Athlete	Country	Results
1st place, gold medalist(s)	Nicole Alexis	France	26.83
2nd place, silver medalist(s)	Angelika Grissmer	Germany	28.88
3rd place, bronze medalist(s)	Tracy Bezance	Great Britain	29.01

=== 400 metres ===
Pos	Athlete	Country	Results
1st place, gold medalist(s)	Simone Geel	Netherlands	1:00.99
2nd place, silver medalist(s)	Elizabeth Helger	Sweden	1:03.89
3rd place, bronze medalist(s)	Tracy Bezance	Great Britain	1:04.56

=== 800 metres ===
Pos	Athlete	Country	Results
1st place, gold medalist(s)	Zofia Wieciorkowska	Poland	2:27.60
2nd place, silver medalist(s)	Sylvia Schierjott	Germany	2:34.41
3rd place, bronze medalist(s)	Luz-Mar Dominguez-Roman	Spain	2:38.53

=== 1500 metres ===
Pos	Athlete	Country	Results
1st place, gold medalist(s)	Zofia Wieciorkowska	Poland	5:06.79
2nd place, silver medalist(s)	Jane Pidgeon	Great Britain	5:21.55
3rd place, bronze medalist(s)	Yolande Patrouilleau	France	5:26.31

=== 5000 metres ===
Pos	Athlete	Country	Results
1st place, gold medalist(s)	Satu Soivanen	Finland	20:32.66
2nd place, silver medalist(s)	Nicole Loeve	Netherlands	20:57.12
3rd place, bronze medalist(s)	Regina Cistiakova	Lithuania	21:21.07

=== 10000 metres ===
Pos	Athlete	Country	Results
1st place, gold medalist(s)	Nicole Loeve	Netherlands	43:25.32
2nd place, silver medalist(s)	Valentina Dorgueva	Russia	45:48.38
3rd place, bronze medalist(s)	Krystyna Pieczulis	Poland	46:00.99

=== 80 metres hurdles ===
Pos	Athlete	Country	Results
1st place, gold medalist(s)	Gaye Clarke	Great Britain	13.97
2nd place, silver medalist(s)	Ganime Nalbantoglu	Turkey	17.59

=== 300 metres hurdles ===
Pos	Athlete	Country	Results
1st place, gold medalist(s)	Romana Schulz	Germany	52.27
2nd place, silver medalist(s)	Tracy Bezance	Great Britain	54.32
3rd place, bronze medalist(s)	Ganime Nalbantoglu	Turkey	1:12.91

=== 2000 metres steeplechase ===
Pos	Athlete	Country	Results
1st place, gold medalist(s)	Zofia Wieciorkowska	Poland	7:47.33
2nd place, silver medalist(s)	Jane Pidgeon	Great Britain	8:14.20
3rd place, bronze medalist(s)	Satu Soivanen	Finland	8:21.17

=== 4×100 metres relay ===
Pos	Athletes	Country	Results
1st place, gold medalist(s)	Wiebke Baseda	Germany	56.68
1st place, gold medalist(s)	Angelika Grissmer	Germany	56.68
1st place, gold medalist(s)	Heike Scheffler	Germany	56.68
1st place, gold medalist(s)	Brigitte Heidrich	Germany	56.68
2nd place, silver medalist(s)	Gaye Clarke	Great Britain	58.95
2nd place, silver medalist(s)	Sharyn Ramage	Great Britain	58.95
2nd place, silver medalist(s)	Janice Ellacott	Great Britain	58.95
2nd place, silver medalist(s)	Tracy Bezance	Great Britain	58.95
3rd place, bronze medalist(s)	Liubov Samotoshenkova	Russia	59.67
3rd place, bronze medalist(s)	Tatyana Lodochnikova	Russia	59.67
3rd place, bronze medalist(s)	Irina Chernykh	Russia	59.67
3rd place, bronze medalist(s)	Natalia Karpushina	Russia	59.67

=== 4×400 metres relay ===
Pos	Athletes	Country	Results
1st place, gold medalist(s)	Heike Scheffler	Germany	4:42.46
1st place, gold medalist(s)	Brigitte Heidrich	Germany	4:42.46
1st place, gold medalist(s)	Marion Hergarten	Germany	4:42.46
1st place, gold medalist(s)	Sylvia Schierjott	Germany	4:42.46
2nd place, silver medalist(s)	Jane Pidgeon	Great Britain	4:43.67
2nd place, silver medalist(s)	Sharyn Ramage	Great Britain	4:43.67
2nd place, silver medalist(s)	Janice Ellacott	Great Britain	4:43.67
2nd place, silver medalist(s)	Tracy Bezance	Great Britain	4:43.67
3rd place, bronze medalist(s)	Olga Goncharevich	Russia	4:47.66
3rd place, bronze medalist(s)	Tatiana Stupnitskaya	Russia	4:47.66
3rd place, bronze medalist(s)	Tatyana Lodochnikova	Russia	4:47.66
3rd place, bronze medalist(s)	Irina Chernykh	Russia	4:47.66

=== Marathon ===
Pos	Athlete	Country	Results
1st place, gold medalist(s)	Valentina Dorgueva	Russia	3:55:30
2nd place, silver medalist(s)	Vera Izmodenova	Russia	3:57:25
3rd place, bronze medalist(s)	Iliusa Khusnetdinova	Russia	4:15:51

=== High jump ===
Pos	Athlete	Country	Results
1st place, gold medalist(s)	Kristina Ponton	Sweden	1.48
2nd place, silver medalist(s)	Gaye Clarke	Great Britain	1.35
3rd place, bronze medalist(s)	Virginija Sniokiene	Lithuania	1.32

=== Long jump ===
Pos	Athlete	Country	Results
1st place, gold medalist(s)	Birgit Burzlaff	Germany	4.90
2nd place, silver medalist(s)	Catherine Seillac	France	4.77
3rd place, bronze medalist(s)	Carina Palmquist	Sweden	4.62

=== Triple jump ===
Pos	Athlete	Country	Results
1st place, gold medalist(s)	Dominique Beaufor	France	10.04
2nd place, silver medalist(s)	Catherine Seillac	France	9.98
3rd place, bronze medalist(s)	Hilde Bottin	Belgium	9.67

=== Shot put ===
Pos	Athlete	Country	Results
1st place, gold medalist(s)	Eha Rynne	Estonia	13.54
2nd place, silver medalist(s)	Valda Morkuniene	Lithuania	13.53
3rd place, bronze medalist(s)	Lea Vahter	Estonia	13.00

=== Discus throw ===
Pos	Athlete	Country	Results
1st place, gold medalist(s)	Eha Rynne	Estonia	45.82
2nd place, silver medalist(s)	Olga Cherniavskaia	Russia	43.13
3rd place, bronze medalist(s)	Janina Lapienienie	Lithuania	40.60

=== Hammer throw ===
Pos	Athlete	Country	Results
1st place, gold medalist(s)	Connie Hodel	Switzerland	46.23
2nd place, silver medalist(s)	Ingrid van Dijk	Netherlands	45.11
3rd place, bronze medalist(s)	Dominique Beaufour	France	42.27

=== Javelin throw ===
Pos	Athlete	Country	Results
1st place, gold medalist(s)	Olga Cogilniceanu	Moldova	38.46
2nd place, silver medalist(s)	Maria Cunha	Portugal	37.88
3rd place, bronze medalist(s)	Caroline Garratt	Great Britain	37.87

=== Weight throw ===
Pos	Athlete	Country	Results
1st place, gold medalist(s)	Ingrid van Dijk	Netherlands	14.21
2nd place, silver medalist(s)	Connie Hodel	Switzerland	13.99
3rd place, bronze medalist(s)	Dominique Beaufour	France	13.34

=== Throws pentathlon ===
Pos	Athlete	Country	Results
1st place, gold medalist(s)	Maria Cunha	Portugal	4119
2nd place, silver medalist(s)	Ingrid van Dijk	Netherlands	4005
3rd place, bronze medalist(s)	Connie Hodel	Switzerland	3949

=== Heptathlon ===
Pos	Athlete	Country	Results
1st place, gold medalist(s)	Romana Schulz	Germany	5145
2nd place, silver medalist(s)	Angela Mueller	Germany	5048
3rd place, bronze medalist(s)	Gaye Clarke	Great Britain	4074

=== 5000 metre track race walk ===
Pos	Athlete	Country	Results
1st place, gold medalist(s)	Veronique Cochereau	France	29:10.65
2nd place, silver medalist(s)	Carmen Garcia Frontons	Spain	29:39.83
3rd place, bronze medalist(s)	Olena Veremiichuk	Ukraine	30:06.32

=== 10000 metre road race walk ===
Pos	Athlete	Country	Results
1st place, gold medalist(s)	Veronique Cochereau	France	1:02:23
2nd place, silver medalist(s)	Carmen Garcia Frontons	Spain	1:04:02
3rd place, bronze medalist(s)	Olena Veremiichuk	Ukraine	1:05:32
