= 2023 European Masters Athletics Championships =

European Masters Athletics Championships 2023
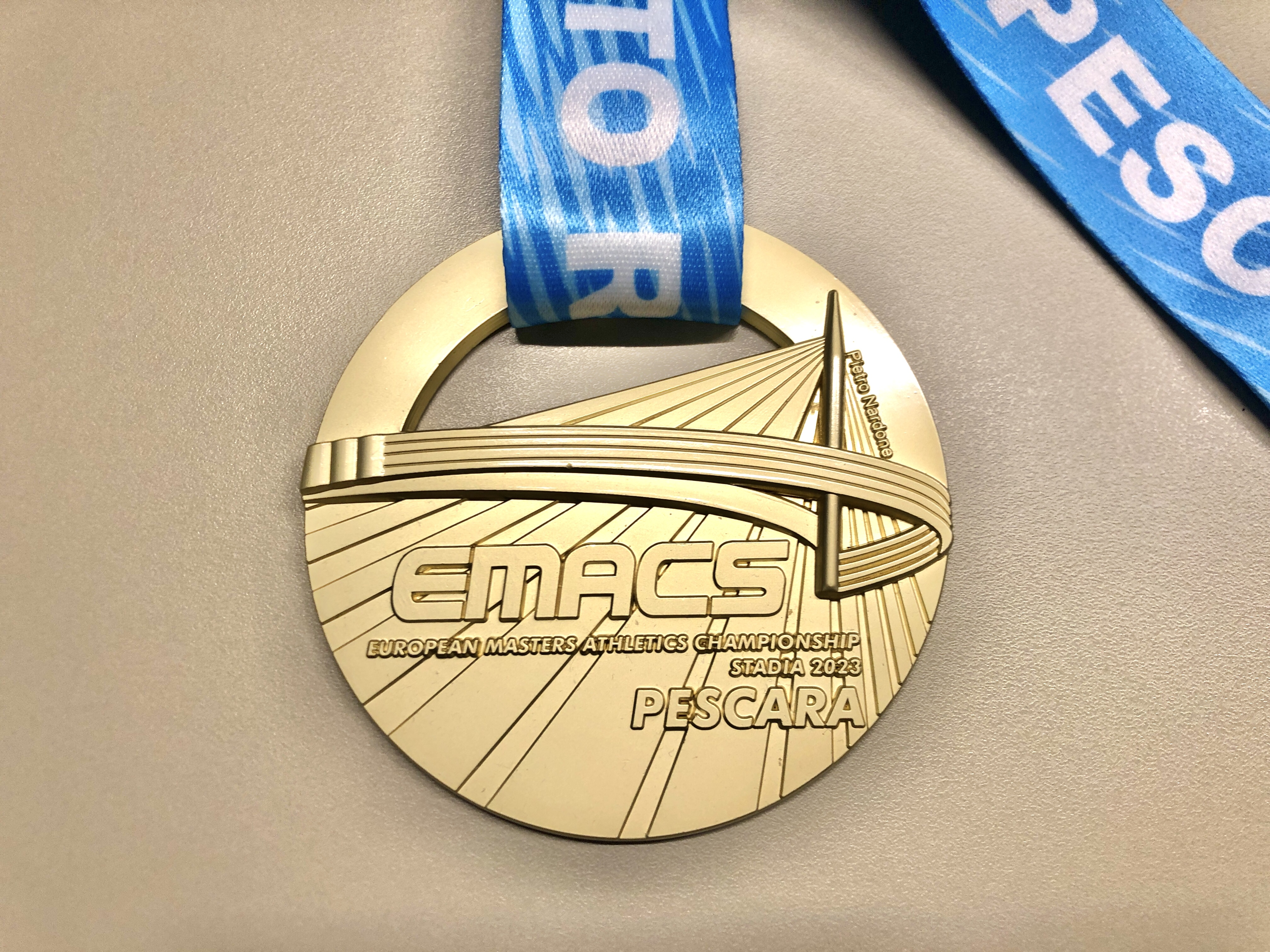
- Organisers: European Masters Athletics
- Edition: 22nd
- Dates: 21 September–1 October
- Host city: Pescara
- Level: Masters
- Type: Outdoor
- Events: 69
- Participation: 4658 athletes from 40 nations
- Official website: https://pescaraemacs2023.it/

The European Masters Athletics Championships 2023 (European Masters Athletics Championships – Stadia) were the 22nd edition of the European Masters Athletics Championships and were held in Pescara, Italy, from 21 September to 1 October 2023.

Three sports venues were used in championships: Giovanni Cornacchia Stadium, Francavilla al Mare Stadium and Montesilvano stadium. There was a total of 4658 participants from 40 countries competing – most in history to date. 69 events were held, 34 for woman, 34 for men and 1 mixed. Italy headed the medal table on 162 gold medals.

== European champions ==
According to sources

=== Men ===
==== 100 m ====
Category	Winner	Result
M35	ITA Nzelibesse Donaldson Kouassi	10.82
M40	ISR Asaf Malka	10.99
M45	SWE Lion Martinez	10.73
M50	ITA Alessandro Lassi	11.43
M55	ITA Mario Longo	11.60
M60	FRA Patrice Carnier	12.32
M65	ITA Alberto Piovani	12.87
M70	GBR Stephen Peters	12.96
M75	ITA Vincenzo Barisciano	14.04
M80	GBR Allan Long	16.60
M85	ITA Valerio Sossella	18.91
M90	FRA André Guiomar	18.93

==== 200 m ====
Category	Winner	Result
M35	ROU Constantin Andonii	22.07
M40	ISR Asaf Malka	22.78
M45	SWE Lion Martinez	22.14
M50	GBR Mike Coogan	23.28
M55	ITA Claudio Fausti	24.44
M60	SWE Jorgen Aberg	25.36
M65	ESP Juan Manuel Exposito Soler	26.87
M70	GBR Stephen Peters	26.94
M75	ITA Livio Bugiardini	28.86
M80	GBR Allan Long	31.97
M85	ITA Valerio Sossella	41.74
M90	GER Hermann Kemmler	48.59

==== 400 m ====
Category	Winner	Result
M35	ROU Constantin Andonii	48.64
M40	POL Jakub Adamczyk	49.61
M45	GRE Antonios Katantonakis	51.43
M50	IRL Carlton Haddock	52.80
M55	ITA Claudio Fausti	54.83
M60	DEN Bernardo Bengtsson	57.46
M65	POL Jan Cząstka	1:01.07
M70	GBR Simon Ralph Barrett	1:07.59
M75	ITA Livio Bugiardini	1:05.83
M80	FRA Jean-Louis Esnault	1:18.23
M85	ITA Remo Marchioni	1:49.42
M90	ITA Andrea Corvetti	2:03.87

==== 800 m ====
Category	Winner	Result
M35	GBR David Proctor	1:56.04
M40	POL Piotr Piątkowski	1:59.59
M45	EST Danel Taur	2:00.07
M50	FRA William Rudloff	2:04.02
M55	ITA Hassan El Azzouzi	2:06.23
M60	FRA Xavier Lefay	2:14.37
M65	GBR Paul Forbes	2:13.74
M70	IRL Joe Gough	2:29.85
M75	NED Hans Smeets	2:43.40
M80	GBR Victor Shirley	3:05.00
M85	ESP Ángel Cano Alcolea	3:55.34
M90	ITA Andrea Corvetti	4:58.84

==== 1500 m ====
Category	Winner	Result
M35	GBR David Proctor	3:58.73
M40	GBR Ian Williamson	4:12.31
M45	EST Indrek Tobreluts	4:08.56
M50	POL Robert Celiński	4:18.08
M55	EST Margus Kirt	4:18.85
M60	GBR David Clarke	4:30.82
M65	GBR Paul Forbes	4:44.40
M70	IRL Joe Gough	5:29.21
M75	NED Hans Smeets	5:47.57
M80	FRA Jean-Louis Esnault	6:19.35
M75	ESP Manuel Alonso Domingo	6:42.61

==== 5000 m ====
Category	Winner	Result
M35	ITA Andrea Falasca Zamponi	15:12.14
M40	ESP Jorge Andres Garcia Sansano	16:29.67
M45	EST Indrek Tobreluts	15:21.78
M50	ESP Oscar Fernandez Santamaria	15:49.06
M55	GER Miguel Molero-Eichwein	16:33.55
M60	FRA Eric Joly	17:13.57
M65	NED Jaap Stijlaart	18:37.19
M70	LUX Victor Kiessel	19:00.01
M75	ITA Araldo Viroli	20:58.20
M80	GBR Martin Ford	23:20.39
M85	ITA Oscar Iacoboni	31:55.17

==== 10000 m ====
Category	Winner	Result
M35	ITA Nicholas De Nicolo'	30:59.52
M40	GER Michael Lang	34:56.05
M45	UKR Oleksandr Sitkovskyi	33:13.38
M50	POR Davide Celestino Carvalho Figueiredo	33:23.84
M55	POR Joaquim Figueiredo	33:54.00
M60	GBR Dave Thom	36:43.62
M65	GBR Colin Feechan	38:42.89
M70	LUX Victor Kiessel	39:34.27
M75	FRA Denis Macagno	46:00.60
M80	FRA Jean-Louis Esnault	52:04.46
M85	DEN Jens Myrup Noe	57:35.23

==== 3000 metres steeplechase / 2000 metres steeplechase ====
Categories M35 to M55: 3000 m, M60 and over: 2000 m.

Category	Winner	Result
M35	GBR Daniel Eckersley	9:11.62
M40	ESP Diego De La Fuente Ibanez	9:38.12
M45	FRA Jerome Chiquet	10:04.61
M50	ESP Francisco Javier Munuera Diaz	10:42.60
M55	ESP Juan Prieto Martin	10:59.31
M60	ITA Claudio Nottolini	7:17.43
M65	ESP Cesar Perez Rodriguez	7:35.72
M70	ITA Adriano Montini	8:33.86
M75	POL Marian Leśniak	10:10.31
M80	SWE Ake Jonson	10:53.57

==== 110 metres hurdles / 100 metres hurdles / 80 metres hurdles ====
Categories M35 to M45: 110 m, M50–M65: 100 m, M70 and over: 80 m.

Category	Winner	Result
M35	ESP Victor Orduna Orduna	14.74
M40	GBR Michael Louise	15.28
M45	GBR Mensah Elliott	14.29
M50	GBR Joe Appiah	13.67
M55	FRA Marin Garrigues	14.77
M60	GBR Neil Tunstall	15.38
M65	GBR Tennyson James	16.23
M70	POL Henryk Szymura	13.32
M75	LAT Valdis Cela	14.31
M80	SWE Nils Baeck	19.38

==== 400 metres hurdles / 300 metres hurdles / 200 metres hurdles ====
Categories M35 to M55: 400 m, M60–M65: 300 m, M70 and over: 200 m.

Category	Winner	Result
M35	POL Radosław Czyż	53.39
M40	POL Jakub Adamczyk	54.12
M45	GBR Darren Towart	1:00.29
M50	GBR Neal Edwards	1:00.10
M55	UKR Oleksandr Syrmolotov	1:03.01
M60	FIN Harri Alatupa	47.25
M65	POR Antonio Beca	48.79
M70	FIN Kari Sanelma	54.31
M75	ESP Jose Luis Romero Minguez	54.31
M80	FRA Jean-Louis Esnault	41.46

==== 4 × 100 metres relay ====
Category	Winners	Result
M35	FRA Cedric Landry Kyce Kisungo; FRA Danaka Willie; FRA Imad Rahoui; FRA Antony Couffe	42.54
M40	GBR John Bowden; GBR Michael Barough; GBR Andy Flint; GBR Leroy Slue	46.65
M45	GBR Sylvester Juwe; GBR Alan Robertson; GBR Joshua Wood; GBR Mensah Elliott	44.43
M50	ITA Emiliano Raspi; ITA Alessandro Lassi; ITA Luigi Cicchetti; ITA Alessandro Garofoli	46.59
M55	FRA Igor Popov; FRA Didier Leforestier; FRA Marin Garrigues; FRA Jacelyn Launey	49.79
M60	GBR Adrian Day; GBR Malcolm Down; GBRGlen Reddington; GBR Tennyson James	49.75
M65	POL Krzysztof Zduniak; POL Stanisław Kłosowicz; POL Andrzej Sut; POL Waldemar Orłowski	52.70
M70	GBR Walwyn Franklyn; GBR David Hinds; GBR Simon Ralph Barrett; GBR Christopher Monk	53.93
M75	ITA Roberto Paesani; ITA Vicenzo La Camera; ITA Aldo Del Rio; ITA Livio Bugiardini	58.34
M80	ITA Romano Carniti; ITA Valerio Sosella; ITA Remo Marchioni; ITA Filippo Torre	1:12.77

==== 4 × 400 metres relay ====
Category	Winners	Result
M35	POL Szymon Ogonowski; POL Jakub Adamczyk; POL Karol Górny; POL Radosław Czyż	3:18.53
M40	ITA Fabrizio Lauretani; ITA Maurizio Finelli; ITA Massino Vidale; ITA Federico Fedi	3:32.52
M45	IRL Ger Cremin; IRL Jim Phelan; IRL Kevin Lynch; IRL Carlton Haddock	3:39.28
M50	FRA Aymeric Besson; FRA William Rudloff; FRA Mickaël Rincé; FRA Bruno Genteuil	3:39.47
M55	ITA Giovanni Matera; ITA Claudio Fausti; ITA Pierluigi Salibra; ITA Hassan El Azzouzi	3:46.35
M60	GBR Adrian Day; GBR Malcolm Down; GBR Glen Reddington; GBR Tennyson James	4:17.58
M65	POL Krzysztof Zduniak; POL Stanisław Kłosowicz; POL Andrzej Sut; POL Jan Cząstka	4:17.97
M70	GBR Paul Wignall; GBR Walwyn Franklyn; GBR David Hinds; GBR Simon Ralph Barrett	4:33.71
M75	ITA Luigi Valdifiori; ITA Aldo Del Rio; ITA Roberto Paesani; ITA Livio Bugiardini	4:52.57

==== High jump ====
Category	Winner	Result
M35	GBR Lloyd Powell; POL Tomasz Rysio	1.85
M40	ITA Mario Ortelli; HUN Napoleon Papp	1.75
M45	LUX Tommy Bourscheid	1.75
M50	ITA Marco De Angelis	1.70
M55	EST Marko Ulla	1.70
M60	ITA Marco Claudio Mastrolorenzi	1.70
M65	UKR Oleg Fedorko	1.60
M70	NOR Ulf Stephen Tudem	1.47
M75	LAT Valdis Cela	1.40
M80	GER Edgar Wittmann	1.29
M85	CZE Josef Vonasek	1.01
M90	FRA Andre Guiomar	1.07

==== Pole vault ====
Category	Winner	Result
M35	POL Przemysław Czerniak	4.80
M40	GER Matti Herrmann	4.30
M45	ESP Gaspar Mateu Carceller	4.20
M50	SWE Jonas Asplund	4.62
M55	FRA Thierry Moyse	4.00
M60	ITA Marco Claudio Mastrolorenzi	3.65
M65	ESP Salvador Maranges Costa	3.50
M70	GER Wolfgang Ritte	3.53
M75	LAT Valdis Cela	2.95
M80	EST Mati Tiidre	2.10
M85	NOR Knut Henrik Skramstad	1.90

==== Long jump ====
Category	Winner	Result
M35	FRA Antony Couffe	7.23
M40	POL Łukasz Sobora	6.89
M45	ITA Almicar Demetrio Bonell Mora	6.38
M50	ITA Stefano Tari'	6.25
M55	ITA Stefano Meazza	5.84
M60	FRA Patrick Barbier	5.54
M65	POL Marek Grzyb	5.02
M70	ROU Adrian Neagu	4.55
M75	SWE Olle Borg	4.37
M80	EST Juhan Tennasilm	3.80
M85	CZE Josef Vonasek	2.45
M90	ITA Aldo Luigi Zorzi	2.12

==== Triple jump ====
Category	Winner	Result
M35	POR Marcos Caldeira	14.40
M40	POL Łukasz Sobora	14.02
M45	ITA Almicar Demetrio Bonell Mora	13.26
M50	ESP Mario Quintero Estrada	12.80
M55	ITA Michele Tico'	11.79
M60	ITA Fabrizio Finetti	11.11
M65	NOR Stein Tore Klungland	10.98
M70	ITA Crescenzio Marchetti	10.22
M75	SWE Olle Borg	9.70
M80	EST Juhan Tennasilm	8.14
M85	ITA Giuseppe Miccoli	6.09

==== Shot put ====
Categories M35 to M45: 7.26 kg, M50–M55: 6 kg, M60–M65: 5 kg, M70–M75: 4 kg, M80 and over: 3 kg.

Category	Winner	Result
M35	FIN Jussi Tukeva	14.97
M40	POL Krzysztof Jacków	14.53
M45	FRA Gregory Bottier	14.00
M50	SUI Roger Strasser	16.58
M55	ITA Giovanni Tubini	14.99
M60	FIN Seppo Paavola	14.16
M65	CZE Vladislav Končický	13.54
M70	ALB Xhavit Derhemi	12.84
M75	NOR Arild Busterud	13.24
M80	GER Roland Heiler	12.62
M85	GER Lothar Huchthausen	9.63
M90	GER Wendelin Acker	7.96

==== Discus throw ====
Categories M35 to M45: 2 kg, M50–M55: 1.5 kg, M60 over: 1 kg.

Category	Winner	Result
M35	NED Stephan Dekker	54.16
M40	POL Krzysztof Jacków	45.86
M45	NOR Bjørn Terje Pay	46.19
M50	GER Ralf Mordhorst	52.01
M55	GER Helmut Maryniak	50.46
M60	GER Norbert Demmel	55.50
M65	GBR John Moreland	46.81
M70	GBR Guy Dirkin	44.17
M75	NOR Arild Busterud	42.38
M80	GER Roland Heiler	33.19
M85	NOR Herman Kristoffer Henriksen	25.86
M90	GER Wendelin Acker	14.88

==== Hammer throw ====
Categories M35 to M45: 7,26 kg, M50–M55: 6 kg, M60–M65: 5 kg, M70–M75: 4 kg, M80 and over: 3 kg.

Category	Winner	Result
M35	EST Indrek Teras	50.18
M40	FIN Petri Rautio	58.25
M45	ITA Pellegrino Delli Carri	57.01
M50	POL Mariusz Walczak	64.52
M55	HUN Balazs Lezsak	56.23
M60	ITA Raffaele Tomaino	50.90
M65	AUT Gottfried Gassenbauer	48.78
M70	GER Gerhard Hoffmann	47.00
M75	NOR Arild Busterud	51.01
M80	FRA Gerard Vignot	38.03
M85	AUT Walter Krifka	39.12
M90	GER Wendelin Acker	21.48

==== Weight throw ====
Categories M35 to M45: 15,88 kg, M50–M55: 11.34 kg, M60–M65: 9.08 kg, M70–M75: 7.26 kg, M80 and over: 5.45 kg.

Category	Winner	Result
M35	EST Indrek Teras	16.14
M40	FIN Petri Rautio	17.00
M45	ITA Pellegrino Delli Carri	18.03
M50	POL Mariusz Walczak	22.46
M55	LTU Gintautas Misevicius	20.27
M60	LTU Rimvydas Medisauskas	20.50
M65	FRA Lucien Noluveau	17.36
M70	GER Gerhard Hoffmann	18.88
M75	NOR Arild Busterud	19.84
M80	POL Czesław Roszczak	15.55
M85	AUT Walter Krifka	15.20
M90	GER Wendelin Acker	9.69

==== Javelin throw ====
Categories M35 to M45: 800 g, M50–M55: 700 g, M60–M65: 600 g, M70–M75: 500 g, M80 and over: 400 g.

Category	Winner	Result
M35	GER Jonas Baseda	59.77
M40	BEL Zacarya Aznag	57.02
M45	EST Ahti Poder	61.22
M50	FIN Petri Satto	54.63
M55	NED Eugene Lommen	55.22
M60	LAT Dainis Kūla	47.01
M65	UKR Serhii Havras	49.51
M70	FRA Jean Michel Prime	41.09
M75	SUI Jerzy Krawczyk	32.75
M80	FIN Jouni Tenhu	39.22
M85	GER Lothar Huchthausen	30.99
M90	GER Wendelin Acker	15.09

==== Throws pentathlon ====
Category	Winner	Result
M35	FIN Jussi Tukeva	3102
M40	GBR James Taylor	3705
M45	ITA Pellegrino Delli Carri	3717
M50	CZE Pavel Penaz	4194
M55	POL Grzegorz Pawelski	3938
M60	GER Norbert Demmel	4526
M65	GBR John Moreland	3804
M70	SWE Ake Ruus	3771
M75	NOR Arild Busterud	4734
M80	POL Czesław Roszczak	3701
M85	GER Ulrich Richter	2900
M90	GER Wendelin Acker	2945

==== Decathlon ====
Category	Winner	Result
M35	FRA Eddy Gouron	5992
M40	ESP David Céspedes Diaz	6616
M45	FIN Simo Piispa	6865
M50	GRE Efthymios Andreoglou	7105
M55	AUT Christopher Kurt Schiefermayer	7468
M60	LTU Vytautas Zaniauskas	7398
M65	GBR Brian Slaughter	6763
M70	EST Ivar Raig	5675
M75	LAT Valdis Cela	7085
M80	SWE Nils Baeck	4576
M85	NOR Knut Henrik Skramstad	4501

==== 5000 metres race walk ====
Category	Winner	Result
M35	ITA Ruggiero D'Ascanio	24:25.44
M40	ESP Juan Manuel Morales Del Castillo	21:31.57
M45	FRA Roland Landron	22:18.15
M50	POL Tomasz Lipiec	22:57.39
M55	ESP Miguel Angel Carvajal Ortega	23:15.10
M60	ESP Miguel Perianez Garcia	24:45.39
M65	CZE Miloslav Lapka	24:40.95
M70	ITA Alberto Pio	28:28.84
M75	GBR Ian Richards	30:24.76
M80	GER Peter Schumm	36:13.64
M85	ITA Romolo Pelliccia	36:06.36
M90	ITA Nazzareno Proietti	46:47.10

==== 10 kilometres race walk ====
Category	Winner	Result
M35	ITA Ruggiero D'Ascanio	53:49
M40	ESP Juan Manuel Morales Del Castillo	46:40
M45	ESP Juan Ruben Pinera Alvarez	49:00
M50	POL Tomasz Lipiec	48:39
M55	ESP Miguel Angel Carvajal Ortega	49:32
M60	ESP Miguel Perianez Garcia	52:03
M65	CZE Miloslav Lapka	51:51
M70	ESP Ignasi Melo Valls	59:01
M75	ITA Ettorino Formentin	1:04:45
M80	GER Peter Schumm	1:13:15
M85	ITA Romolo Pelliccia	1:12:12
M90	ITA Nazzareno Proietti	1:37:40

==== 10 kilometres race walk – teams ====
Category	Winners	Result
M35	ITA Ruggiero D'Ascanio; ITA Andrea Romanelli; ITA Roberto De Rosa	2:52:15
M40	POL Grzegorz Grinholc; POL Sebastian Karpiński; POL Tomasz Lipiec	2:39:15
M45	ITA Luca Latorre; ITA Vincenzo Pontrandolfo; ITA Fabio Mattia Saturini	2:36:35
M50	ITA Giuseppe Sapanaro; ITA Luigi Paulini; ITA Gian Mauro Pirino	2:40:17
M55	ESP Miguel Angel Carvajal Ortega; ESP Juan Manuel De Lucas Pasalodes; ESP Migueal Perinarez Garcia	2:37:07
M60	ITA Antonio Lopetuso; ITA Gabriele Caldarelli; ITA Alessandro Volpi	2:55:20
M65	ESP Pedro Jose Aranda Fenandez; ESP Ignasi Melo Valls; ESP Miguel Angel Munitxa Narbaiza	3:01:06
M70	ITA Alberto Pio; ITA Pierdomenico Tolomei; ITA Marco Cavedagni	3:12:10
M75	ITA Ettorino Formentin; ITA Roberto Piaser; ITA Corradi Carbonaro	3:22:19
M80	ITA Gianfranco De Lucia; ITA Amatore Michieletto; ITA Romolo Pelliccia	3:51:21

==== 20 kilometres race walk ====
Category	Winner	Result
M35	ESP David Sanchez Montoya	1:59:26
M40	ESP David Traid Tirado	1:48:59
M45	ITA Vincenzo Pontrandolfo	1:47:22
M50	LAT Normunds Ivzans	1:45:14
M55	ESP Miguel Angel Carvajal Ortega	1:42:24
M60	ESP Miguel Perianez Garcia	1:50:29
M65	ITA Edoardo Alfieri	1:55:48
M70	FRA Patrice Brochot	2:06:07
M75	ITA Ettorino Formentin	2:17:59

==== 20 kilometres race walk – teams ====
Category	Winners	Result
M45	ITA Vincenzo Pontrandolfo; ITA Marco Giachetti; ITAFabio Mattia Saturni	5:44:54
M50	ITA Giuseppe Messina; ITA Sebastiano Barone; ITA Bernardo Cartoni	5:52:04
M55	ITA Giancarlo Camilletti; ITA Romeo Tigre; ITA Renzo Mengoni	6:02:21
M60	ESP Miguel Perianez Garcia; ESP Pedro Jose Aranda Fernandez; ESP Ignasi Melo Valls	5:59:37
M65	ITA Edoardo Alfieri; ITA Paolo Diego Fissore; ITA Rosario Gallo	6:12:21
M70	GER Reinhard Langhammer; GER Stefan Lehmann; GER Horst Kiepert	7:09:05
M75	ITA Ettorino Formentin; ITA Corrado Carbonaro; ITA Biagio Giannone	7:31:49

==== 8 km Cross country running / 6 km Cross country running ====
Categories M35 to M65: 8 km, M70 and over: 6 km.

Category	Winner	Result
M35	ESP Cristian Benitez Sanchez	22:51
M40	ESP Miguel Del Pozo Alvarez	23:09
M45	POL Grzegorz Kujawski	22:48
M50	ESP Francisco Javier Donato Rosendo	23:38
M55	GER Miguel Molero-Eichwein	23:47
M60	SWE Håkan Eriksson (orienteer)	25:55
M65	GBR Colin Feechan	27:18
M70	ITA Luciano Moser	22:03
M75	ITA Araldo Viroli	22:26
M80	GBR Martin Ford	25:27
M85	DEN Jens Myrup Noe	30:22

==== 8 km Cross country running / 6 km Cross country running – teams ====
Categories M35 to M65: 8 km, M70 and over: 6 km.

Category	Winners	Result
M35	ITA Rafał Andrzej Nordwing; ITA Alessio Bisogno; ITA Riccardo Trovato	1:11:35
M40	ESP Miguel del Pozo Álvarez; ESP Juan Emilio Miras Costa; ESP Raul Grinan Serrano	1:12:56
M45	ESP Javier Diaz Carretero; ESP Victor Ramón Peña Martinez; ESP Javier Martin-Pozo Marchand	1:12:02
M50	ESP Francisco Javier Donato Rosendo; ESP Oscar Fernandez Santamaria; ESP Francisco Manuel Mora Arroyo	1:13:38
M55	ITA Abdelkrim Boumalik; ITA Valerio Brigone; ITA Mauro Biglione	1:13:48
M60	GBR Chris Upson; GBR Dave Thom; GBR Gregory Penn	1:19:11
M65	ITA Martino Palmieri; ITA Paolo Gatti; ITA Domenico Buccella	1:35:41
M70	ITA Luciano Moser; ITA Bruno Sarale; ITA Rolando Di Marco	1:06:64
M75	GBR Aleksander Swiecicki; GBR John Exley; GBR Alan Appleby	1:13:!6
M80	ITA Carlo Dell'Acqua; ITA Luciano Fera; ITA Leonardo Serena	1:38:38

==== 10K run ====
Category	Winner	Result
M35	ITA Umberto Persi	31:53
M40	ESP Miguel Del Pozo Alvarez	32:17
M45	GER Thomas Kotissek	32:09
M50	FRA Frédéric Gilbert	32:54
M55	GER Miguel Molero-Eichwein	32:56
M60	ESP Francisco Garcia Lopez	36:47
M65	GBR Colin Feechan	38:18
M70	ITA Luciano Moser	41:08
M75	ITA Araldo Viroli	43:30
M80	SWE Åke Jonson	52:29
M85	ITA Leonardo Serena	1:18:02
M90	ITA Angelo Squadrone	1:42:50

==== 10K run – teams ====
Category	Winners	Result
M35	ITA Umberto Pesri; ITA Italo Giancaterina; ITA Maurizio Raimond Vanotti	1:37:53
M40	ESP Miguel Del Pozo Álvarez; ESP Manuel Ángel Fernández García; ESP Adrian Vazquez Lopez	1:42:50
M45	ITA Elio Battistella; ITA Emiliano Carloni; ITA Andrea Perinato	1:41:29
M50	ESP Oscar Fernandez Santamaria; ESP Raul Carreras Galve; ESP Francisco Manuel Mora Arroyo	1:47:14
M55	ESP Victor Javier Gallego-Casilda Arranz; ESP Juan Francisco Ruiz Espinosa; ESP Oscar Carreras Galve	1:50:59
M60	ITA Ermes Marilungo; ITA Maurizio Leonardi; ITA Francesco Barletta	1:52:57
M65	ITA Mauro Grande; ITA Martino Palmieri; ITA Giammario Rossi	2:08:06
M70	ESP Pablo Fervenza Entenza; ESP Oscar Calvé San Juan; ESP Jesus Maria Turiso Pena	2:20:05
M75	ITA Araldo Viroli; ITA Antonio Paragine; ITA Fernando Gatti	2:18:29
M80	ITA Ulisse Benedetti; ITA Elpidio Cappelletti; ITA Luciano Fera	3:07:28
M85	ITA Sebastiano Caldarella; ITA Leonardo Serena; ITA Angelo Squadrone	4:12:36

==== Half marathon ====
Category	Winner	Result
M35	ITA Umberto Persi	1:08:34
M40	ITA Carlo Cangiano	1:11:47
M45	GER Thomas Kotissek	1:10:32
M50	ITA Joachim Nshimirimana	1:10:17
M55	ITA Said Boudalia	1:12:52
M60	ESP Francisco Garcia Lopez	1:19:30
M65	GBR Colin Feechan	1:21:57
M70	LUX Victor Kiessel	1:26:36
M75	NED Dirk Visser	1:39:31
M80	GBR Martin Ford	2:00:19
M85	DEN Jens Myrup Noe	2:10:56

==== Half marathon – teams ====
Category	Winners	Result
M35	ITA Umberto Persi; ITA Italo Giancaterina; ITA Mauro Gibellini	3:30:23
M40	ITA Carlo Cangiano; ITA Cristian Carboni; ITA Manuel Menna	3:41:06
M45	GER Thomas Kotissek; GER Sebastian Hoenig; GER Tobias Balthesen	3:40:25
M50	ITA Joachim Nshimirimana; ITA Francesco Duca; ITA Luca Maiorani	3:43:34
M55	ITA Said Boudalia; ITA Abdelkrim Boumalik; ITA Francesco Turano	3:41:37
M60	ESP Francisco Garcia López; ESP Jose Antonio Morales Robles; ESP Juan José Barbera Casillas	4:10:18
M65	ITA Pietro Uras; ITA Stefano Rascioni; ITA Edoardo Guidara	4:32:30
M70	ITA Lucio Floridi; ITA Romeo Bruno; ITA Gaetano Caso	4:38:44

=== Woman ===
==== 100 m ====
Category	Winner	Result
W35	GBR Hayley Mills	12.03
W40	GER Sinah Florence Haenssler-Hug	12.38
W45	ROU Adina Gheorghiu	12.54
W50	ITA Cristina Sanulli	12.66
W55	ESP Esther Colas Roman	13.41
W60	FRA Nicole Alexis	13.61
W65	GBR Caroline Powell	14.82
W70	ITA Mariuccia Quilleri	15.54
W75	ESP Maria Area Diego	17.38
W80	GBR Kathleen Stewart	18.99
W85	GBR Dorothy Fraser	24.52

==== 200 m ====
Category	Winner	Result
W35	GBR Hayley Mills	24.34
W40	GER Sinah Florence Haenssler-Hug	25.71
W45	ROU Adina Gheorghiu	26.05
W50	ITA Cristina Sanulli	26.53
W55	ESP Esther Colas Roman	27.41
W60	FRA Nicole Alexis	28.84
W65	GBR Jane Horder	30.93
W70	ITA Mariuccia Quilleri	33.38
W75	FRA Michelle Peroni	33.50
W80	DEN Menja Stapelfeld	40.93
W85	GBR Dorothy Fraser	1:00.46

==== 400 m ====
Category	Winner	Result
W35	FIN Erika Utriainen	58.72
W40	SWE Paulina Orell Sahlberg	57.97
W45	IRL Annette Quaid	57.83
W50	GER Tatjana Schilling	1:00.51
W55	ESP Esther Colas Roman	1:02.32
W60	GBR Virginia Mitchell	1:06.13
W65	SWE Gunnel Tolfes	1:11.32
W70	SUI Alison Bourgeois	1:15.92
W75	FRA Michelle Peroni	1:17.71
W80	GBR Kathleen Stewart	1:38.12
W85	GBR Anne Martin	2:29.75

==== 800 m ====
Category	Winner	Result
W35	ITA Gloria Guerrini	2:13.58
W40	POL Anna Rostkowska	2:14.62
W45	GBR Zoe Doyle	2:14.71
W50	GBR Nikki Sturzaker	2:23.55
W55	GER Eva Trost	2:26.99
W60	POR Luisa Coelho	2:27.74
W65	SWE Gunnel Tolfes	2:50.37
W70	SUI Alison Bourgeois	2:59.32
W75	GBR Angela Copson	3:17.08
W80	GBR Betty Stracey	5:11.78
W85	GBR Anne Martin	5:46.40

==== 1500 m ====
Category	Winner	Result
W35	POL Sandra Michalak	4:35.41
W40	POL Anna Rostkowska	4:31.77
W45	GBR Zoe Doyle	4:58.11
W50	ITA Mara Cerini	5:01.30
W55	GBR Lucy Elliott	4:54.25
W60	ESP Maria Esther Pedrosa Carrete	5:21.18
W65	GBR Jill Harrison	5:52.18
W70	SUI Alison Bourgeois	6:09.89
W75	GBR Angela Copson	6:33.08
W80	FIN Hannele Kivisto	8:44.82

==== 5000 m ====
Category	Winner	Result
W35	SWE Sara Trane	17:53.83
W40	ITA Lia Tavelli	18:36.48
W45	ITA Claudia Pinna	18:28.99
W50	ITA Carla Primo	17:57.52
W55	GBR Lucy Elliott	18:16.98
W60	ITA Elena Giovanna Fustella	19:55.21
W65	GBR Jill Harrison	21:31.74
W70	GER Margret Göttnauer	22:28.83
W75	GBR Angela Copson	23:38.78
W80	LAT Zinaida Racenaja	30:20.87

==== 10000 m ====
Category	Winner	Result
W35	ITA Laura Nardo	38:03.17
W40	AUT Karin Freitag	39:10.89
W45	ITA Laura Pardini	40:31.23
W50	EST Liliana Torn	40:34.35
W55	GER Ute Krause	45:39.24
W60	AUT Sabine Hofer	42:39.48
W65	GBR Jeanette Reay	46:05.79
W70	GER Margret Göttnauer	48:17.74
W75	GBR Angela Copson	51:54.22
W80	FIN Hannele Kivistö	1:03:39.50

==== 2000 metres steeplechase ====
Category	Winner	Result
W35	AUT Bettina Hötzenegger	7:03.22
W40	ESP Vanesa Pacha Urteaga	7:15.67
W45	GBR Kirstie Booth	6:58.45
W50	ESP Nuria Etxegarai Carbajo	7:58.97
W55	GER Katja Knospe	8:32.72
W65	GER Rita Schubert	10:39.39
W70	FIN Eliisa Reijonen	11:07.35
W75	CZE Miloslava Ročňáková	14:32.36

==== 100 metres hurdles / 80 metres hurdles ====
Category W35: 100 m, categories W40 and over: 80 m.

Category	Winner	Result
W35	FIN Viivi Avikainen	13.93
W40	ITA Serena Caravelli	11.47
W45	GER Jennifer Gartmann	11.78
W50	GER Tatjana Schilling	12.72
W55	TUR Hülya Figen Karadağ	13.73
W60	GER Olga Becker	12.95
W65	GBR Jane Horder	13.33
W70	GBR Emily McMahon	17.37
W75	ITA Ingeborg Zorzi	21.36

==== 400 metres hurdles / 300 metres hurdles / 200 metres hurdles ====
Categories W35 to W45: 110 m, W50–W65: 300 m, W70 and over: 200 m.

Category	Winner	Result
W35	GBR Emily Bonnett	1:01.22
W40	SWE Paulina Orell Sahlberg	1:02.50
W45	GRE Anastasia Thomaidou	1:04.18
W50	ITA Emanuela Baggiolini	47.50
W55	TUR Hulya Figen Karadag	52.14
W60	GBR Susan Frisby	52.51
W65	GBR Jane Horder	52.41
W70	SWE Ulla Karnebäck	40.01
W75	FIN Terhi Kokkonen	44.88

==== 4 × 100 metres relay ====
Category	Winners	Result
W35	GBR Joanne Ryan; GBR Roisin McBride; GBR Krystle Balogun; GBR Hayley Mills	50.30
W40	ITA Silvia Di Domenico; ITA Serena Caravelli; ITA Annachiara De Pippo; ITA Rosa Iovine	51.35
W45	ITA Ivana Fella; ITA Marta Manfrin; ITA Silke Breckenfelder; ITA Maria De Lourde Quinonez Montano	52.42
W50	ITA Agnese Claudia Rossi; ITA Cristina Sanulli; ITA Michela Borscia; ITA Denise Caroline Neumann	50.83
W55	ITA Miriam Di Iorio; ITA Stefania Baggiani; ITA Marta Roccano; ITA Cristina Sattin	55.73
W60	ITA Renate Prast; ITA Monica Dessi'; ITA Patrizia Pasini; ITA Paola Pasini	57.44
W65	GBR Carole Filer; GBR Nicola Buckwell; GBR Jane Horder; GBR Caroline Powell	1:01.02
W70	ITA Maria Spagnuolo; ITA Mara Ferrini; ITA Anna Beatrice Micheletti; ITA Mariuccia Quilleri	1:08.50

==== 4 × 400 metres relay ====
Category	Winners	Result
W35	GER Daniela Kliche; GER Yvonne Ruckert; GER Henriette Bohn; GER Marion Stedfeld	4:13.89
W40	IRL Bronwen McDonald; IRL Maria Dunne; IRL Leanne Wellings; IRL Annette Quaid	4:10.90
W45	ITA Eliana Marcela Zuniga; ITA Jessica Fantini; ITA Marta Manfrin; ITA Maria De Lourde Quinonez Montano	4:13.50
W50	ITA Maria Grazia Distatnre; ITA Gigliola Giorgi; ITA Paola Paolicchi; ITA Lara Gualtieri	4:31.26
W55	ESP María del Carmen Pérez Muñoz; ESP Antonia Ruiz Álvarez; ESP Juana Gibaja Sanchez; ESP Esther Colás Román	4:30.96
W60	GBR Christine Anthony; GBR Louise Jeffries; GBR Janice Ellacott; GBR Virginia Mitchell	4:42.99
W65	GBR Hilary West; GBR Anne Dockery; GBR Jeanette Ashton; GBR Joylyn Saunders-Mullins	5:38.67
W75	GER Elisabeth Springer; GER Gabriele Rost-Brazholz; GER Maria Brigitte Nittel; GER Gudrun Liedtke	8:33.02

==== High jump ====
Category	Winner	Result
W35	FIN Miia Lindholm	1.70
W40	AUT Chantal Duelli	1.55
W45	GER Jennifer Gartmann; FIN Tuire Maki	1.50
W50	HUN Kitty Vadasz	1.50
W55	ITA Monica Buizza	1.42
W60	IRL Edel Maguire; GER Frauke Viebahn	1.42
W65	GER Jutta Pfannkuche	1.36
W70	SLO Stanka Prezelj	1.23
W75	ITA Ingeborg Zorzi	1.10
W80	AUT Marianne Maier	1.04

==== Pole vault ====
Category	Winner	Result
W35	ESP Beatriz Viteri Bouso	3.40
W40	GBR Caroline Parkinson	3.20
W45	SWE Malin Weiland	3.41
W50	GBR Irie Hill	3.25
W55	ITA Daniela Parenti	2.60
W60	GER Petra Herrmann	2.60
W70	GER Ute Ritte	2.30

==== Long jump ====
Category	Winner	Result
W35	FIN Miia Lindholm	5.34
W40	SUI Laura Torino-Imberti	5.29
W45	BUL Magdalena Hristova	5.58
W50	NED Anja Mulder	4.88
W55	CRO Renata Novosel	5.48
W60	GER Olga Becker	4.65
W65	GBR Carole Filer	4.13
W70	GER Ute Ritte	3.67
W75	SUI Margaritha Daehler-Stettler	3.18
W80	AUT Marianne Maier	3.27
W85	GBR Anne Martin	1.83
W95	FIN Senni Sopanen	0.97

==== Triple jump ====
Category	Winner	Result
W35	FIN Miia Lindholm	11.58
W40	SUI Laura Torino-Imberti	11.46
W45	GER Sandra Kramer	12.08
W50	NED Anja Mulder	10.56
W55	SWE Annica Sandstroem	10.39
W60	GER Petra Herrmann	9.34
W65	FIN Anna-Liisa Salminen	8.90
W70	ITA Maria Grazia Rafti	7.79
W75	FIN Terhi Kokkonen	6.75
W80	GBR Iris Holder	5.00
W85	GBR Anne Martin	4.04
W95	FIN Senni Sopanen	2.53

==== Shot put ====
Categories W35 to W45: 4 kg, W50–W70: 3 kg, W75 and over: 2 kg.

Category	Winner	Result
W35	GBR Niabari Rutter	11.99
W40	DEN Maria Sloek Hansen	14.95
W45	UKR Tetyana Nasonova	13.64
W50	GBR Paula Williams	13.30
W55	GER Jana Mueller Schmidt	13.28
W60	GER Birgit Plifke	12.81
W65	GER Uta Teuber	11.22
W70	LTU Genovaite Kazlauskiene	9.74
W75	HUN Maria Terezia Gosztolai	10.20
W80	AUT Marianne Maier	10.10
W85	GBR Evaun Williams	8.93
W95	FIN Senni Sopanen	3.73

==== Discus throw ====
Categories W35 to W70: 1 kg, W75 and over: 0.75 kg.

Category	Winner	Result
W35	GBR Emma Beardmore	39.94
W40	FRA Sibylle Retour	47.57
W45	SWE Lena Björk	40.22
W50	GER Bettina Schardt	41.09
W55	POL Małgorzata Krzyżan	38.26
W60	LTU Janina Lapieniene	38.61
W65	NED Hannie G Ebbekink Tukkers	31.02
W70	ESP Merce Ribelles Buxaderas	27.24
W75	HUN Maria Terezia Gosztolai	29.17
W80	LAT Maija Jakobsone	25.91
W85	POL Ewa Frąckowiak	11.54

==== Hammer throw ====
Categories W35 to W45: 4 kg, W50–W70: 3 kg, W75 and over: 2 kg.

Category	Winner	Result
W35	ISR Evgenia Zabolotni	53.42
W40	GBR Lucy Marshall	53.88
W45	GBR Andrea Jenkins	43.02
W50	ITA Patrizia Aletta	48.38
W55	FRA Claudine Cacaut	43.36
W60	ITA Marzia Zanoboni	44.07
W65	ITA Anna Maria Camoletto	34.30
W70	GER Eva Nohl	32.58

==== Weight throw ====
Categories W35 to W45: 9.08 kg, W50–W55: 7.25 kg, W60–W70: 5.45 kg, W75 and over: 4 kg.

Category	Winner	Result
W35	GBR Emma Beardmore	15.18
W40	GBR Lucy Marshall	15.65
W45	FIN Kirsi Koro	14.41
W50	LUX Mireille Kosmala	15.36
W55	GER Margret Klein-Raber	15.59
W60	FRA Dominique Beaufour	16.85
W65	FIN Liisa Makitorma	15.14
W70	GER Eva Nohl	13.35
W75	NED Annie Van Anholt	13.47
W80	ITA Brunella Del Giudice	11.02
W85	GBR Evaun Williams	11.54

==== Javelin throw ====
Categories W35 to W45: 600 g, W50–W70: 500 g, W75 and over: 400 g.

Category	Winner	Result
W35	GBR Laurensa Britane	45.51
W40	GER Mareike Metz	40.44
W45	LTU Indrė Jakubaitytė	44.50
W50	HUN Agnes Benczenleitnerne Preisinger	41.27
W55	FIN Kristiina Peltola	35.05
W60	FIN Heli Herlevi-Malila	34.17
W65	CZE Vanda Marusova	32.31
W70	FIN Riitta Rajamäki	23.37
W75	LAT Helēna Ringa	22.89
W80	SUI Adelheid Graber-Bolliger	23.17
W85	GBR Evaun Williams	24.24

==== Throws pentathlon ====
Category	Winner	Result
W35	LUX Geraldine Davin	2702
W40	DEN Maria Sloek Hansen	3775
W45	SVK Katarina Marettova	3165
W50	ITA Patrizia Aletta	3571
W55	GER Ellen Weller Dr	3531
W60	ITA Waltraud Mattedi	3809
W65	FIN Liisa Makitorma	3949
W70	GER Eva Nohl	3701
W75	DEN Inge Faldager	3513
W80	ITA Maria Luisa Fancello	3264
W85	GBR Evaun Williams	5150

==== Heptathlon ====
Category	Winner	Result
W35	GBR Niabari Rutter	4466
W40	FIN Tessa Tillgren	5010
W45	GER Jennifer Gartmann	5294
W50	GER Tatjana Schilling	6165
W55	IRL Geraldine Finegan	5026
W60	NOR Heidi Barth	4950
W65	NED Anja Akkerman-Smits	4742
W70	SWE Ulla Karnebäck	4525
W75	ITA Ingeborg Zorzi	3713

==== 5000 metres race walk ====
Category	Winner	Result
W35	LAT Modra Liepina	26:08.58
W40	POR Vera Santos	24:57.02
W45	ITA Rosetta La Delfa	24:08.33
W50	GBR Grazia Manzotti	27:39.10
W55	HUN Kata Bodorkos Horvath	26:57.27
W60	ESP Maria Del Carmen Garcia Frontons	31:46.51
W65	FRA Marie Astrid Monmessin	29:48.03
W70	POR Maria Orlete Mendes	31:12.41
W75	UKR Antonina Tyshko	33:55.65
W80	GER Helga Dräger	46:57.28

==== 10 kilometres race walk ====
Category	Winner	Result
W35	LAT Modra Liepina	55:15
W40	POR Vera Santos	51:18
W45	ITA Rosetta La Delfa	50:41
W50	ITA Sandra Franceschini	55:38
W55	HUN Kata Bodorkos Horvath	56:17
W60	SUI Dora Briere	1:05:01
W65	FRA Marie Astrid Monmessin	1:03:03
W70	POR Maria Orlete Mendes	1:06:10
W75	UKR Antonina Tyshko	1:13:37
W80	GER Helga Dräger	1:38:20

==== 10 kilometres race walk – teams ====
Category	Winners	Result
W35	FRA Elodie Varoquiere; FRA Laurence Sina; FRA Valerie Roban	2:55:15
W40	ITA Lucia Battaglia; ITA Giulia Donato; ITA Alessandra Canuti	3:03:10
W45	ITA Rosetta La Delfa; ITA Valeria Pedetti; ITA Gloria Gueretta	2:39:58
W50	ITA Sandra Franceschini; ITA Elena Cinca; ITA Laura Meloni	2:55:24
W55	ITA Marcella Ioele; ITA Anna Bancivenga; ITA Maria Antonia Pais	3:11:48
W60	AUT ERNEJ Anna Maria Ernej; AUT Christa Triebl; AUT Andrea Zirknitzer	3:35:03
W65	ITA Daniela Ricciutelli; ITA Ivana Roggero; ITA Giuseppina Comba	3:20:48
W70	LAT Nina Jurcina; LAT Dzidra Sirve; LAT Brigita De Kope	4:23:28

==== 20 kilometres race walk ====
Category	Winner	Result
W35	FRA Elodie Varoquier	2:04:33
W40	ITA Lucia Battaglia	1:56:02
W45	HUN Valeria Molnar Dr	1:52:39
W50	GBR Grazia Manzotti	2:01:00
W55	HUN Kata Bodorkos Horvath	2:00:38
W60	GBR Maureen Elvaria Noel	2:16:16
W65	ITA Giuseppina Comba	2:21:52
W70	POR Maria Orlete Mendes	2:21:38
W75	UKR Antonina Tyshko	2:36:07

==== 20 kilometres race walk – teams ====
Category	Winners	Result
W45	GER Bianca Schenker; GER Gudrun Klose; GER Monika Mueller	6:48:31
W50	FRA Laurence Sina; FRA Valerie Boban; FRA Catherine Florentin	6:20:04
W55	ESP Myriam Clarisa Alcaire Ernst; ESP Isabel Ruiz-Ayucur Seifert; ESP Aurora Orda Alvares	6:58:13
W60	GER Antje Koehler; GER Brigitte Patrzalek; GER Maria Rita Echle	7:12:40

==== 8 km Cross country running / 6 km Cross country running ====
Categories W35 to W45: 8 km, W50 and over: 6 km.

Category	Winner	Result
W35	IRL Catherine O'Connor	26:17
W40	IRL Michelle Kenny	26:25
W45	ESP Elisa Hernandez Asensio	25:59
W50	ITA Carla Primo	25:59
W55	GBR Lucy Elliott	27:12
W60	AUT Sabine Hofer	28:53
W65	POR Rosa Mota	29:21
W70	GER Margret Göttnauer	25:22
W75	ITA Venere Sarra	28:48
W80	LAT Zinaida Racenaja	33:31

==== 8 km Cross country running / 6 km Cross country running – teams ====
Categories W35 to W45: 8 km, W50 and over: 6 km.

Category	Winners	Result
W35	GER Patricia Corinne Grewatta; GER Sonja Deiss; GER Claudia Seel	1:30:07
W40	IRL Michelle Kenny; IRL Eimear Purdue; IRL Zoe Quinn	1:23:48
W45	ESP Elisa Hernandez Asensio; ESP Sara Beltran Bascon; ESP Nidia Zulma Borget Ruidiaz	1:25:15
W50	ITA Carla Primo; ITA Marcella Municchi; ITA Cinzia Zugnoni	1:23:50
W55	ITA Paola Impedovo; ITA Rita Mascitti; ITA Giuseppina Sorrenti	1:33:10
W60	IRL Niamh O'Sullivan; IRL Irene Clements; IRL Kay Byrne	1:29:59
W65	ITA Anna Patelli; ITA Mirella Di Pietro; ITA Cinzia Barletta	1:48:47
W70	GER Margret Göttnauer; GER Marion Saras; GER Lilo Hartenberger	1:22:57
W75	GER Maria Brigitte Nittel; GER Gabriele Rost-Brasholz; GER Gabriele Rost-Brasholz	1:38:25

==== 10K run ====
Category	Winner	Result
W35	SWE Sara Trané	37:09
W40	AUT Karin Freitag	37:44
W45	ITA Elisa Comisso	37:19
W50	ESP Arancha Tejero Tejadas	38:54
W55	IRL Annette Kealy	39:50
W60	AUT Sabine Hofer	40:56
W65	GBR Jeanette Reay	43:51
W70	GER Margret Göttnauer	47:47
W75	GBR Anne Dockery	52:14
W80	FIN Hannele Kivisto	1:01:56

==== 10K run – teams ====
Category	Winners	Result
W35	ITA Nausicaa Malaccari; ITA Chiara Nash; ITA Catia Fusoni	1:58:28
W40	ESP Ana Belen Bernalte Incertis; ESP Noelia Muñoz Ramos; ESP Ana Belén Morales Ramírez	2:00:35
W45	ITA Elisa Comisso; ITA Paola Patta; ITA Chiara Gallorini	1:56:41
W50	ITA Cinzia Zugnoni; ITA Valentina Russo; ITA Barbara Cicetti	2:16:59
W55	GER Josefa Matheis; GER Ute Krause; GER Katja Knospe	2:11:37
W60	IRL Niamh O'Sullivan; IRL Irene Clements; IRL Kay Byrne	2:09:13
W65	ITA Antonella Sassi; ITA Mirella Di Pietro; ITA Marzia Frattini	2:34:38
W70	GER Margret Göttnauer; GER Marion Sarasa; GER Lilo Hartenberger	2:37:54
W75	GER Maria Brigitte Nittel; GER Gabriele Rost-Brasholz; GER Elisabeth Springer	3:29:53

==== Half marathon ====
Category	Winner	Result
W35	GRE Fotini Dagli Pagotto	1:17:46
W40	GBR Sara Green	1:17:28
W45	ITA Francesca Battacchi	1:24:28
W50	ITA Claudia Gelsomino	1:21:23
W55	IRL Annette Kealy	1:26:27
W60	AUT Sabine Hofer	1:29:04
W65	ITA Silvia Bolognesi	1:36:46
W70	GER Margret Göttnauer	1:48:20
W75	ITA Venere Sarra	2:02:01
W80	FIN Hannele Kivisto	2:20:43

==== Half marathon – teams ====
Category	Winners	Result
W35	GBR Alexis Dodd; GBR Sara Green; GBR Allie Chong	4:14:42
W40	ESP Almudena De La Ossa Yunta; ESP Tannia Elena Quirós Rodríguez; ESP Maria Tarrio Martinez	4:31:08
W45	ITA Francesca Battachi; ITA Chiara Gallorini; ITA Emanuela Varasano	4:20:05
W50	ITA Claudia Gelsomino; ITA Jlenia Stragliotto; ITA Giulia Agresta	4:33:13
W55	IRL Donna Evans; IRL Annette Kealy; IRL Irene Clements	4:35:29
W60	ITA Eva Toccafondi Grunwald; ITA Silvia Gennari; ITA Annamaria Masetti	5:21:22
W65	ITA Silvia Bolognesi; ITA Anna Maria Canarecci; ITA Mirella Di Pietro	5:19:56
W75	GER Maria Brigitte Nittel; GER Maria-Luise Kluge; GER Gabriele Rost-Brasholz	6:47:07

=== Mixed ===
==== 4 × 400 metres relay ====
Category	Winners	Result
MIX35	ESP Alejandro Rimmer Linan; ESP Amanda Vazquez Doncel Moriano; ESP Udomsinachi Onyemachi Erete Umechuruba; ESP Teresa Torres Gutierez	3:42.08
MIX40	POL Karol Górny; POL Agnieszka Olczyk; POL Jakub Adamczyk; POL Aneta Grot	3:48.08
MIX45	IRL Ger Cremin; IRL Leanne Wellings; IRL Carlton Haddock; IRL Annette Quaid	3:49.52
MIX50	ITA Luigi Cicchetti; ITA Agnese Claudia Rossi; ITA Giovambattista Pollicino; ITA Cristina Sanulli	3:52.97
MIX55	ITA Giovanni Matera; ITA Cristina Galli'; ITA Hassan El Azzouzi; ITA Paola Lorena Pascon	4:06.76
MIX60	GER Wolfgang Schmidt; GER Christiane Contag; GER Ted Spitzer; GER Brigitte Heindrich	4:23.90
MIX65	GBR Adrian Day; GBR Caroline Powell; GBR Tennyson James; GBR Jane Horder	4:32.51
MIX70	GER Heinz Baseda; GER Margret Göttnauer; GER Wolfgang Custodis; GER Marion Ertl	5:43.66
MIX75	GBR Victor Shirley; GBR Anne Dockery; GBR Bruce Hendrie; GBR Angela Copson	5:40.92

== Medals table ==
* Host nation (Italy)

Rank	Nation	Gold	Silver	Bronze	Total
1	Italy (ITA)*	162	105	124	391
2	Great Britain (GBR)	108	93	77	278
3	Germany (GER)	83	82	72	237
4	Spain (ESP)	62	64	53	179
5	France (FRA)	39	61	53	153
6	Finland (FIN)	34	26	16	76
7	Poland (POL)	33	43	35	111
8	Sweden (SWE)	23	21	22	66
9	Ireland (IRL)	17	24	12	53
10	Austria (AUT)	16	14	5	35
11	Latvia (LAT)	13	12	11	36
12	Estonia (EST)	13	6	9	28
13	Norway (NOR)	12	10	9	31
14	Netherlands (NED)	11	12	13	36
15	Portugal (POR)	11	6	11	28
16	Switzerland (SUI)	10	9	5	24
17	Hungary (HUN)	10	6	10	26
18	Denmark (DEN)	9	7	8	24
19	Ukraine (UKR)	8	16	9	33
20	Czech Republic (CZE)	8	14	14	36
21	Lithuania (LTU)	6	3	6	15
22	Luxembourg (LUX)	6	1	1	8
23	Romania (ROU)	5	4	6	15
24	Greece (GRE)	4	6	5	15
25	Israel (ISR)	3	0	0	3
26	Turkey (TUR)	2	1	0	3
27	Belgium (BEL)	1	8	13	22
28	Slovenia (SLO)	1	5	4	10
29	Bulgaria (BUL)	1	2	1	4
30	Albania (ALB)	1	0	2	3
31	Montenegro (MNE)	0	1	1	2
32	San Marino (SMR)	0	1	0	1
Totals (32 entries)		712	663	607	1,982
