= 2017 European Masters Athletics Championships =

- Dates: 27 July-6 August
- Host city: Aarhus, Denmark
- Venue: Atletion
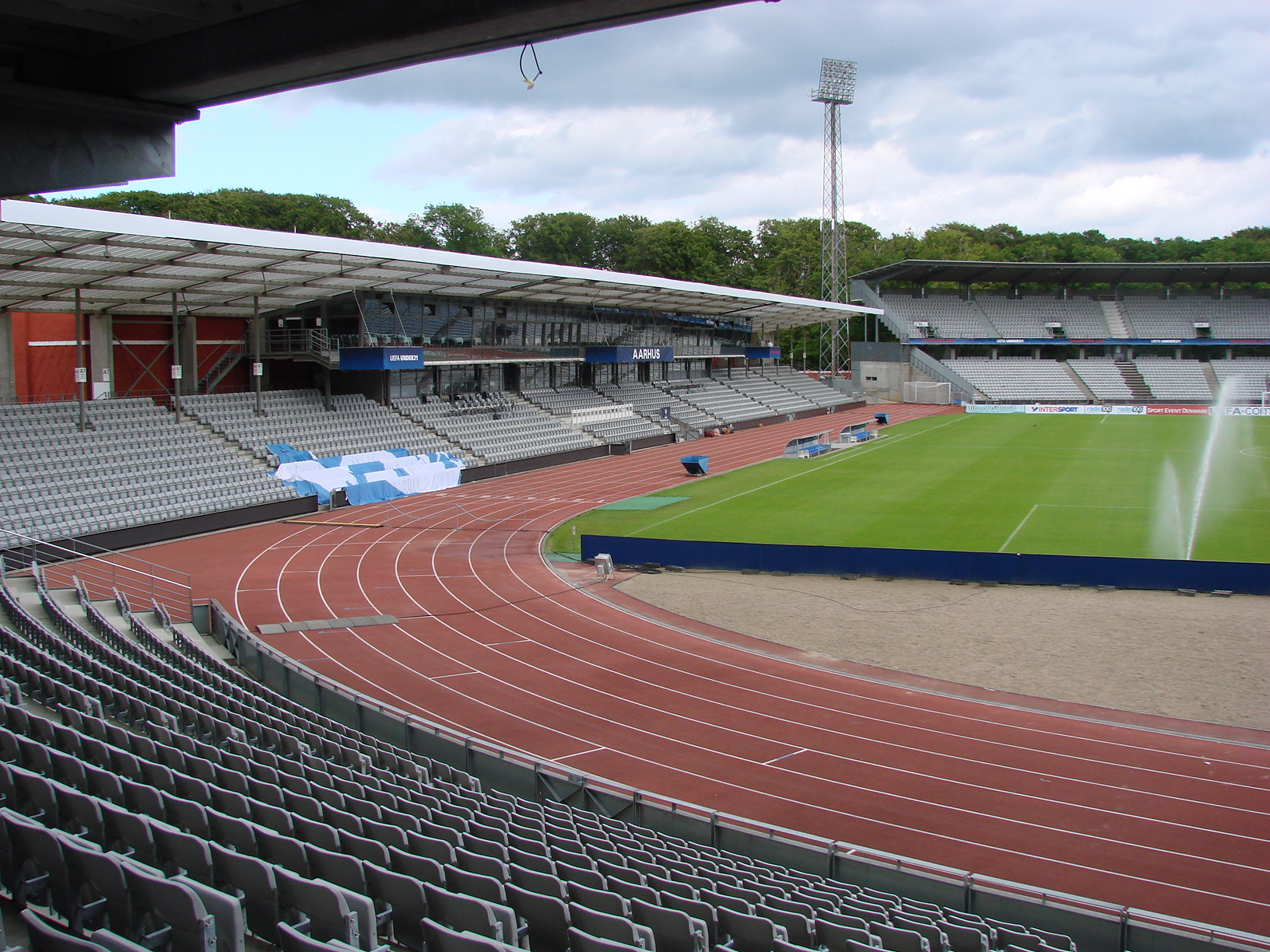
- Level: Masters
- Type: Stadia

The twentieth European Masters Athletics Championships was held in Aarhus, Denmark, from 27 July-6 August 2017. The European Masters Athletics Championships serve the division of the sport of athletics for people over 35 years of age, referred to as masters athletics.
