= European Masters Athletics Championships =

- Genre: Masters athletics
- Frequency: biennial
- Website: european-masters-athletics.org

The European Masters Athletics Championships (formerly European Veterans Athletics Championships) are the biannual championships for masters athletics events held under the auspices of European Masters Athletics (formerly European Veterans Athletics Association) that held its first edition in 1978.

== Editions ==
Edition	Year	Venue	Dates
1	1978	(Italy) Viareggio	10–16 September
2	1980	(Finland) Helsinki	6–10 August
3	1982	(France) Strasbourg	14–18 July
4	1984	(United Kingdom) Brighton	20–25 August
5	1986	(Sweden) Malmö	28 July – 2 August
6	1988	(Italy) Verona	25 June – 2 July
7	1990	(Hungary) Budapest	30 June – 7 July
8	1992	(Norway) Kristiansand	26 June – 4 July
9	1994	(Greece) Athens	3–12 June
10	1996	(Sweden) Malmö	19–27 July
11	1998	(Italy) Cesenatico	11–19 September
12	2000	(Finland) Jyväskylä	6–16 July
13	2002	(Germany) Potsdam	15–25 August
14	2004	(Denmark) Aarhus	22 July – 1 August
15	2006	(Poland) Poznań	20–30 July
16	2008	(Slovenia) Ljubljana	23 July – 3 August
17	2010	(Hungary) Nyíregyháza	15–24 July
18	2012	(Germany) Zittau (Poland) Zgorzelec (Czech Republic) Hrádek nad Nisou	16–25 August
19	2014	(Turkey) İzmir	22–31 August
20	2017	(Denmark) Aarhus	27 July – 6 August
21	2019	(Italy) Jesolo, Caorle, Eraclea	5–15 September
22	2023	(Italy) Pescara	21 September – 1 October
23	2025	(Portugal) Madeira	9–19 October

== History Results ==
- 2014 Medal Table : http://www.fidalservizi.it/risultati/Izmir_2014/MEDALTABLE1.htm
- 2017 Medal Table : http://www.fidalservizi.it/risultati/2017/AArhus_2017/MEDALTABLE1.htm
- 2019: https://web.archive.org/web/20200217155611/http://emac2019.fidalservizi.it/
- 2019: https://web.archive.org/web/20200221191214/http://www.fidal.it/risultati/2019/COD7632/Index.htm
- 2019 EMG : https://web.archive.org/web/20221222210307/http://www.fidalservizi.it/risultati/2019/EMG_2019/Index.htm
- 2022: http://www.fidalservizi.it/risultati/2022/
- https://web.archive.org/web/20200221191214/http://www.fidal.it/risultati/2019/COD7632/Index.htm
- https://web.archive.org/web/*/http://www.fidalservizi.it/risultati/2010/*
- https://web.archive.org/web/*/http://www.fidalservizi.it/risultati/2011/*
- https://web.archive.org/web/*/http://www.fidalservizi.it/risultati/2012/*
- https://web.archive.org/web/*/http://www.fidalservizi.it/risultati/2013/*
- https://web.archive.org/web/*/http://www.fidalservizi.it/risultati/2014/*
- https://web.archive.org/web/*/http://www.fidalservizi.it/risultati/2015/*
- https://web.archive.org/web/*/http://www.fidalservizi.it/risultati/2016/*
- https://web.archive.org/web/*/http://www.fidalservizi.it/risultati/2017/*
- https://web.archive.org/web/*/http://www.fidalservizi.it/risultati/2018/*
- https://web.archive.org/web/*/http://www.fidalservizi.it/risultati/2019/*
- https://web.archive.org/web/*/http://www.fidalservizi.it/risultati/2020/*
- https://web.archive.org/web/*/http://www.fidalservizi.it/risultati/2021/*
- https://web.archive.org/web/*/http://www.fidalservizi.it/risultati/2022/*
- https://web.archive.org/web/*/http://www.fidalservizi.it/risultati/2023/*

== See also ==
- World Masters Athletics Championships
- European Masters Games
- Senior sport
