= 2015 World Masters Athletics Championships =

Coordinates: 45.7879°N 4.7976°E

- Dates: 4 - 16 August 2015
- Host city: Lyon, France
- Venue: Stade de Balmont
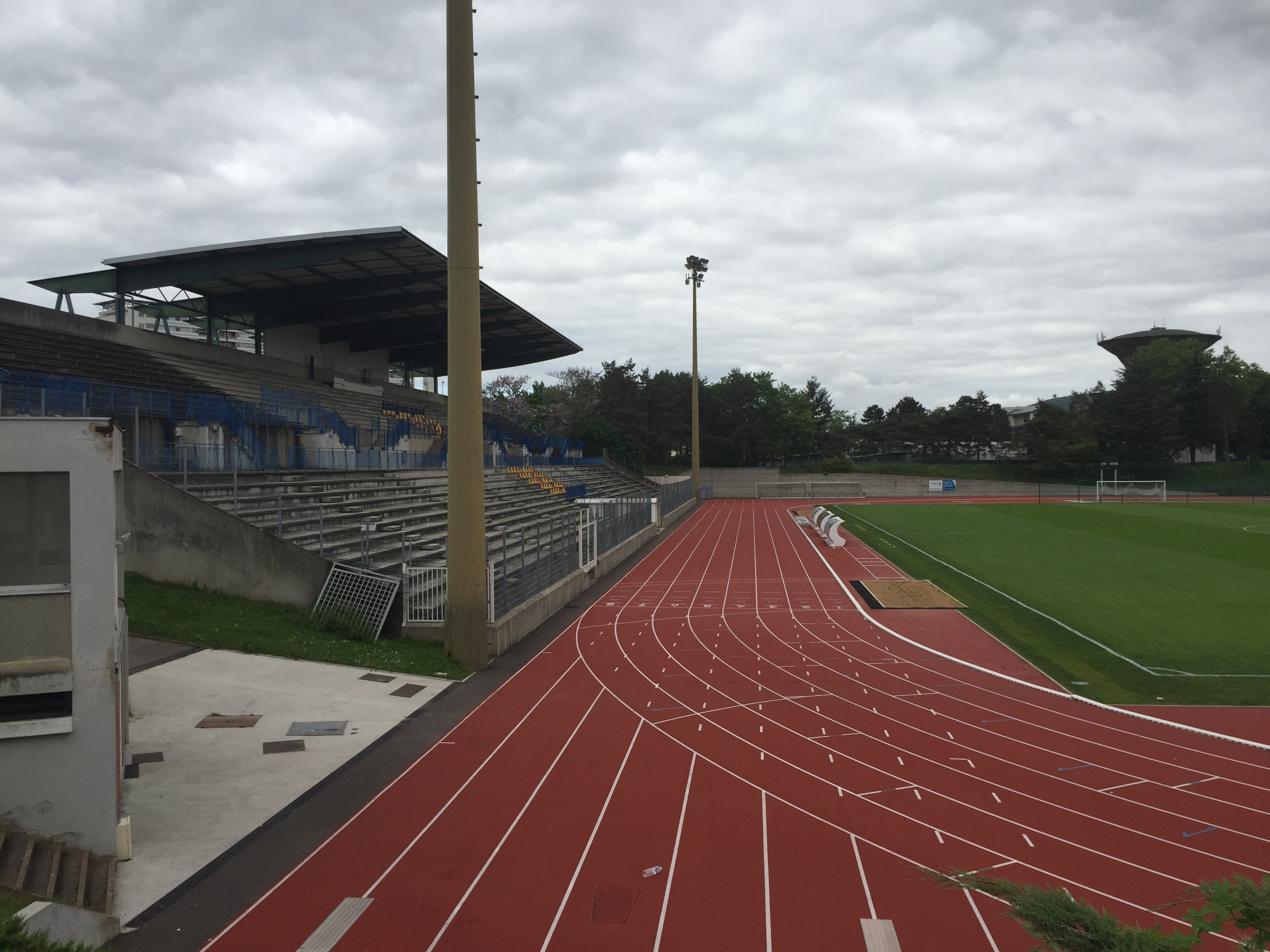
- Level: Masters
- Type: Outdoor
- Participation: 8073 athletes from 98 nations
- Official website: Archived 2015-11-16 at the Wayback Machine

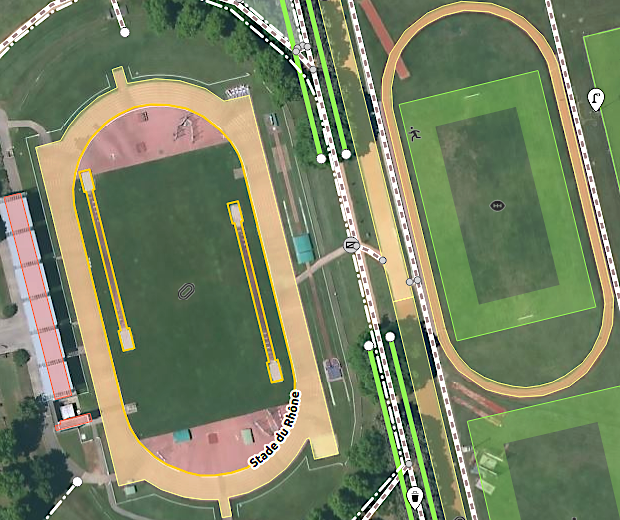
Stade du Rhône

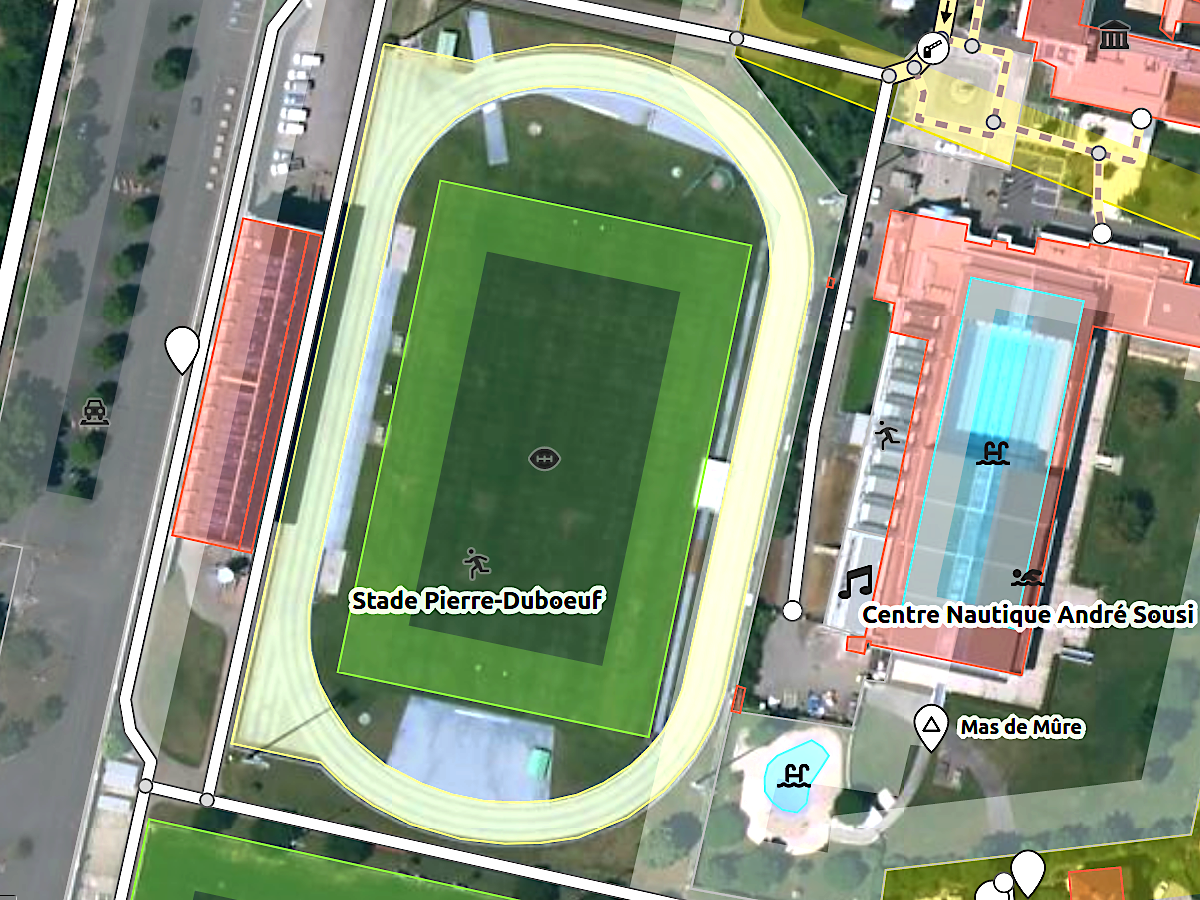
Stade Pierre Duboeuf

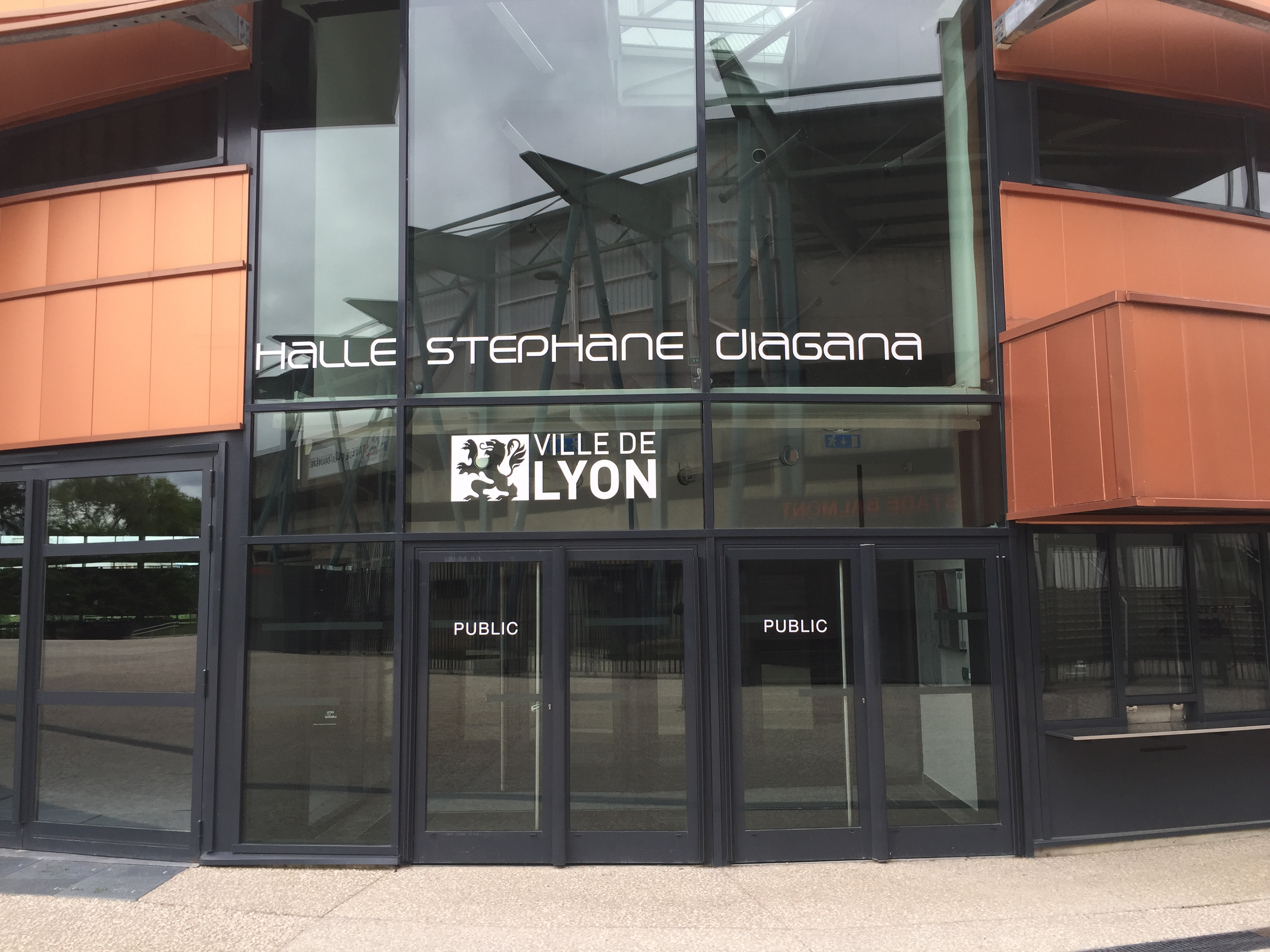
Centre d'Information Technique

2015 World Masters Athletics Championships is the 21st in a series of World Masters Athletics Outdoor Championships that took place in Lyon, France from 4 to 16 August 2015. This was the last odd year of the biennial Championships; beginning in 2016, the Championships will be held in even-numbered years. The change was made to avoid conflict with the quadrennial World Masters Games, which had been held in odd-numbered years since 2005.

The main venue was Stade de Balmont (Stade de La Duchère). Supplemental venues included Stade du Rhône (Stade de Parilly) for road races and throwing events, the newly resurfaced Stade Pierre Duboeuf in Bron, the newly resurfaced Stade Laurent Gérin in Vénissieux, and Halle d'athlétisme Stéphane-Diagana as the Centre d'Information Technique.

This Championships was organized by World Masters Athletics (WMA) in coordination with a Local Organising Committee (LOC) led by Marcel Ferrari, Ligue d'Athlétisme Rhône-Alpes (Athlé).

The WMA is the global governing body of the sport of athletics for athletes 35 years of age or older, setting rules for masters athletics competition.

In addition to a full range of track and field events, non-stadia events included 8K Cross Country, 10K Race Walk, 20K Race Walk, Half Marathon and Marathon.

== Results ==
Official results are archived at Athlé. Past Championships results are archived at WMA. Additional archives are available from British Masters Athletic Federation in HTML format, and from European Masters Athletics as a searchable pdf. Race Walk results are archived at Swiss Walking.

The "8000 Meter Run" published in the result archives should actually be "8K Cross Country", so the world records listed at WMA may have been incorrectly recorded, as every age group winner was reported as setting a world record and none of these records are documented in List of masters world records in road running. A similar clerical error is in 2010 World Masters Athletics Indoor Championships.

Top medal winners are listed only for selected events. Masters world records set at this Championships are indicated by WR . Wind aided performances are indicated by .

=== 100 Meters ===
Event	Pos	Athlete	Country	Result
W35 100 Meters; Wind: -2.2
W35 100 Meters; Wind: -2.2	1st place, gold medalist(s)	Ayanna Hutchinson	Trinidad and Tobago	12.30
W35 100 Meters; Wind: -2.2	2nd place, silver medalist(s)	Sasha Springer	Trinidad and Tobago	12.49
W35 100 Meters; Wind: -2.2	3rd place, bronze medalist(s)	Brandi Bernert	United States	12.66
W40 100 Meters; Wind: -1.4
W40 100 Meters; Wind: -1.4	1st place, gold medalist(s)	Alisha Natasha Fortune	Guyana	12.35
W40 100 Meters; Wind: -1.4	2nd place, silver medalist(s)	Emilia Paunica	Spain	12.56
W40 100 Meters; Wind: -1.4	3rd place, bronze medalist(s)	Khama Beckles	Canada	12.59
W45 100 Meters; Wind: -1.9
W45 100 Meters; Wind: -1.9	1st place, gold medalist(s)	Emmanuelle McGowan	United States	12.85
W45 100 Meters; Wind: -1.9	2nd place, silver medalist(s)	Maria Ruggeri	Italy	12.89
W45 100 Meters; Wind: -1.9	3rd place, bronze medalist(s)	Maryvonne Icarre	France	12.96
W50 100 Meters; Wind: -2.0
W50 100 Meters; Wind: -2.0	1st place, gold medalist(s)	Elizabeth Wilson	New Zealand	13.44
W50 100 Meters; Wind: -2.0	2nd place, silver medalist(s)	Valerie Klostermann	Netherlands	13.51
W50 100 Meters; Wind: -2.0	3rd place, bronze medalist(s)	Claudia Andrea Munizaga	Chile	13.68
W55 100 Meters; Wind: -2.0
W55 100 Meters; Wind: -2.0	1st place, gold medalist(s)	Nicole Alexis	France	13.23 (13.03 -0.6 WR)
W55 100 Meters; Wind: -2.0	2nd place, silver medalist(s)	Marie Kay	Australia	13.59
W55 100 Meters; Wind: -2.0	3rd place, bronze medalist(s)	Loles Vives	Spain	13.67
W60 100 Meters; Wind: -1.5
W60 100 Meters; Wind: -1.5	1st place, gold medalist(s)	Karla Del Grande	Canada	13.92
W60 100 Meters; Wind: -1.5	2nd place, silver medalist(s)	Caroline Powell	Great Britain	14.20
W60 100 Meters; Wind: -1.5	3rd place, bronze medalist(s)	Wendy Alexis	Canada	14.32
W65 100 Meters; Wind: -2.6
W65 100 Meters; Wind: -2.6	1st place, gold medalist(s)	Ingrid Meier	Germany	14.67
W65 100 Meters; Wind: -2.6	2nd place, silver medalist(s)	Evelyn Peake	Australia	14.99
W65 100 Meters; Wind: -2.6	3rd place, bronze medalist(s)	Brenda Matthews	United States	15.29
W70 100 Meters; Wind: -3.4
W70 100 Meters; Wind: -3.4	1st place, gold medalist(s)	Barbro Bobäck	Sweden	15.88
W70 100 Meters; Wind: -3.4	2nd place, silver medalist(s)	Marge Allison	Australia	16.26
W70 100 Meters; Wind: -3.4	3rd place, bronze medalist(s)	Christine Waring	New Zealand	16.52
W75 100 Meters; Wind: -3.1
W75 100 Meters; Wind: -3.1	1st place, gold medalist(s)	Kathy Bergen	United States	16.31
W75 100 Meters; Wind: -3.1	2nd place, silver medalist(s)	Christa Bortignon	Canada	16.87
W75 100 Meters; Wind: -3.1	3rd place, bronze medalist(s)	Leontine Vitola	Latvia	18.71
W80 100 Meters; Wind: -1.3
W80 100 Meters; Wind: -1.3	1st place, gold medalist(s)	Irene Obera	United States	17.57
W80 100 Meters; Wind: -1.3	2nd place, silver medalist(s)	Emma Maria Mazzenga	Italy	19.39
W80 100 Meters; Wind: -1.3	3rd place, bronze medalist(s)	Mitsu Hotsumi Shimizu	Brazil	19.51
W85 100 Meters; Wind: -2.9
W85 100 Meters; Wind: -2.9	1st place, gold medalist(s)	Ernestina Ramirez Garcia	Mexico	21.13
W85 100 Meters; Wind: -2.9	2nd place, silver medalist(s)	Austra Reinberga	Latvia	22.14
W85 100 Meters; Wind: -2.9	3rd place, bronze medalist(s)	Maria Pastora Londoño	Colombia	23.51
W90 100 Meters; Wind: -2.9
W90 100 Meters; Wind: -2.9	1st place, gold medalist(s)	Emilia García de Fontán	Colombia	26.06
M35 100 Meters; Wind: -0.8
M35 100 Meters; Wind: -0.8	1st place, gold medalist(s)	Orkatz Beitia	Spain	10.85
M35 100 Meters; Wind: -0.8	2nd place, silver medalist(s)	Babatunde Ridley	United States	10.87
M35 100 Meters; Wind: -0.8	3rd place, bronze medalist(s)	Jimmy Melfort	France	10.90
M40 100 Meters; Wind: -2.8
M40 100 Meters; Wind: -2.8	1st place, gold medalist(s)	Tamunonengiye-Ofori Ossai	Great Britain	10.98
M40 100 Meters; Wind: -2.8	2nd place, silver medalist(s)	Albert St'Louis	Trinidad and Tobago	11.29
M40 100 Meters; Wind: -2.8	3rd place, bronze medalist(s)	Anibal Gamez	Venezuela	11.30
M45 100 Meters; Wind: -2.1
M45 100 Meters; Wind: -2.1	1st place, gold medalist(s)	Reggie Pendland	United States	11.24
M45 100 Meters; Wind: -2.1	2nd place, silver medalist(s)	Jason Carty	Great Britain	11.26
M45 100 Meters; Wind: -2.1	3rd place, bronze medalist(s)	Darren Scott	Great Britain	11.27
M50 100 Meters; Wind: -3.8
M50 100 Meters; Wind: -3.8	1st place, gold medalist(s)	Robert Moen	Netherlands	11.77
M50 100 Meters; Wind: -3.8	2nd place, silver medalist(s)	Alfonso De Feo	Italy	11.84
M50 100 Meters; Wind: -3.8	3rd place, bronze medalist(s)	Roland Gröger	Germany	11.86
M55 100 Meters; Wind: -2.9
M55 100 Meters; Wind: -2.9	1st place, gold medalist(s)	Allan Tissenbaum	United States	12.05
M55 100 Meters; Wind: -2.9	2nd place, silver medalist(s)	Güner Güngör	Turkey	12.19
M55 100 Meters; Wind: -2.9	3rd place, bronze medalist(s)	Bruno Dupuy	France	12.25
M60 100 Meters; Wind: -1.5
M60 100 Meters; Wind: -1.5	1st place, gold medalist(s)	Steve Peters	Great Britain	12.11
M60 100 Meters; Wind: -1.5	2nd place, silver medalist(s)	Harri Huotari	Finland	12.11
M60 100 Meters; Wind: -1.5	3rd place, bronze medalist(s)	Rudolf König	Germany	12.30
M65 100 Meters; Wind: -0.9
M65 100 Meters; Wind: -0.9	1st place, gold medalist(s)	Wojciech Seidel	Poland	12.97
M65 100 Meters; Wind: -0.9	2nd place, silver medalist(s)	Winfried Heckner	Germany	13.12
M65 100 Meters; Wind: -0.9	3rd place, bronze medalist(s)	Vincenzo Barisciano	Italy	13.17
M70 100 Meters; Wind: -0.4
M70 100 Meters; Wind: -0.4	1st place, gold medalist(s)	Glyn Sutton	Great Britain	12.99
M70 100 Meters; Wind: -0.4	2nd place, silver medalist(s)	Kenton Brown	United States	13.20
M70 100 Meters; Wind: -0.4	3rd place, bronze medalist(s)	Wilfredo Picorelli	Puerto Rico	13.24
M75 100 Meters; Wind: -0.8
M75 100 Meters; Wind: -0.8	1st place, gold medalist(s)	Guido Müller	Germany	13.83
M75 100 Meters; Wind: -0.8	2nd place, silver medalist(s)	Aimo Mikkola	Finland	13.98
M75 100 Meters; Wind: -0.8	3rd place, bronze medalist(s)	Juhan Tennasilm	Estonia	14.59
M80 100 Meters; Wind: +1.0
M80 100 Meters; Wind: +1.0	1st place, gold medalist(s)	Hans Bloechlinger	Switzerland	14.98
M80 100 Meters; Wind: +1.0	2nd place, silver medalist(s)	Dick Richards	United States	15.02
M80 100 Meters; Wind: +1.0	3rd place, bronze medalist(s)	Monty Hacker	South Africa	15.29
M85 100 Meters; Wind: -1.7
M85 100 Meters; Wind: -1.7	1st place, gold medalist(s)	Yoshiyuki Shimizu	Brazil	16.75
M85 100 Meters; Wind: -1.7	2nd place, silver medalist(s)	Michel Claverie	France	17.14
M85 100 Meters; Wind: -1.7	3rd place, bronze medalist(s)	Luis Hernando Osorio Berrio	Colombia	17.64
M90 100 Meters; Wind: -2.6
M90 100 Meters; Wind: -2.6	1st place, gold medalist(s)	Hugo Antonio Delgado Flores	Peru	19.76
M90 100 Meters; Wind: -2.6	2nd place, silver medalist(s)	Mamoru Ussami	Brazil	19.83
M90 100 Meters; Wind: -2.6	3rd place, bronze medalist(s)	James Sinclair	Australia	19.89
M95 100 Meters; Wind: -2.6
M95 100 Meters; Wind: -2.6	1st place, gold medalist(s)	Charles Eugster	Great Britain	23.50
M95 100 Meters; Wind: -2.6	2nd place, silver medalist(s)	Frederico Fischer	Brazil	24.89

=== 200 Meters ===
Event	Pos	Athlete	Country	Result
W35 200 Meters; Wind: 0.0
W35 200 Meters; Wind: 0.0	1st place, gold medalist(s)	Sasha Springer	Trinidad and Tobago	24.76
W35 200 Meters; Wind: 0.0	2nd place, silver medalist(s)	Ayanna Hutchinson	Trinidad and Tobago	25.02
W35 200 Meters; Wind: 0.0	3rd place, bronze medalist(s)	Emily Jouberton	France	25.44
W40 200 Meters; Wind: +1.0
W40 200 Meters; Wind: +1.0	1st place, gold medalist(s)	Alisha Natasha Fortune	Guyana	24.88
W40 200 Meters; Wind: +1.0	2nd place, silver medalist(s)	Emilia Paunica	Spain	25.83
W40 200 Meters; Wind: +1.0	3rd place, bronze medalist(s)	Assum Puig Planella	Spain	26.48
W45 200 Meters; Wind: 0.0
W45 200 Meters; Wind: 0.0	1st place, gold medalist(s)	Janelle Delaney	Australia	25.78
W45 200 Meters; Wind: 0.0	2nd place, silver medalist(s)	Emmanuelle McGowan	United States	25.91
W45 200 Meters; Wind: 0.0	3rd place, bronze medalist(s)	Heike Jörg	Germany	26.01
W50 200 Meters; Wind: +1.7
W50 200 Meters; Wind: +1.7	1st place, gold medalist(s)	Elizabeth Wilson	New Zealand	27.19
W50 200 Meters; Wind: +1.7	2nd place, silver medalist(s)	Valerie Klostermann	Netherlands	27.38
W50 200 Meters; Wind: +1.7	3rd place, bronze medalist(s)	Julie Forster	Australia	27.78
W55 200 Meters; Wind: +1.7
W55 200 Meters; Wind: +1.7	1st place, gold medalist(s)	Nicole Alexis	France	27.06 WR
W55 200 Meters; Wind: +1.7	2nd place, silver medalist(s)	Marie Kay	Australia	27.30
W55 200 Meters; Wind: +1.7	3rd place, bronze medalist(s)	Averil Mcclelland	Great Britain	28.30
W60 200 Meters; Wind: +0.4
W60 200 Meters; Wind: +0.4	1st place, gold medalist(s)	Karla Del Grande	Canada	28.88
W60 200 Meters; Wind: +0.4	2nd place, silver medalist(s)	Caroline Powell	Great Britain	29.03
W60 200 Meters; Wind: +0.4	3rd place, bronze medalist(s)	Wendy Alexis	Canada	29.62
W65 200 Meters; Wind: +2.2
W65 200 Meters; Wind: +2.2	1st place, gold medalist(s)	Ingrid Meier	Germany	30.68w
W65 200 Meters; Wind: +2.2	2nd place, silver medalist(s)	Evelyn Peake	Australia	30.90w
W65 200 Meters; Wind: +2.2	3rd place, bronze medalist(s)	Brenda Matthews	United States	32.40w
W70 200 Meters; Wind: +0.4
W70 200 Meters; Wind: +0.4	1st place, gold medalist(s)	Barbro Bobäck	Sweden	32.82
W70 200 Meters; Wind: +0.4	2nd place, silver medalist(s)	Marge Allison	Australia	33.46
W70 200 Meters; Wind: +0.4	3rd place, bronze medalist(s)	Marianne Maier	Austria	34.52
W75 200 Meters; Wind: +1.8
W75 200 Meters; Wind: +1.8	1st place, gold medalist(s)	Kathy Bergen	United States	33.79 WR
W75 200 Meters; Wind: +1.8	2nd place, silver medalist(s)	Christa Bortignon	Canada	35.88
W75 200 Meters; Wind: +1.8	3rd place, bronze medalist(s)	Leontine Vitola	Latvia	37.54
W80 200 Meters; Wind: +1.7
W80 200 Meters; Wind: +1.7	1st place, gold medalist(s)	Irene Obera	United States	37.29
W80 200 Meters; Wind: +1.7	2nd place, silver medalist(s)	Emma Maria Mazzenga	Italy	40.28
W80 200 Meters; Wind: +1.7	3rd place, bronze medalist(s)	Leili Kaas	Estonia	41.45
W85 200 Meters; Wind: +0.8
W85 200 Meters; Wind: +0.8	1st place, gold medalist(s)	Ernestina Ramirez Garcia	Mexico	47.17
W85 200 Meters; Wind: +0.8	2nd place, silver medalist(s)	Marcia Petley	New Zealand	52.21
W85 200 Meters; Wind: +0.8	3rd place, bronze medalist(s)	Gwendoline Gleeson	Australia	1:00.65
W90 200 Meters; Wind: +0.8
W90 200 Meters; Wind: +0.8	1st place, gold medalist(s)	Emilia García de Fontán	Colombia	58.64
M35 200 Meters; Wind: +1.1
M35 200 Meters; Wind: +1.1	1st place, gold medalist(s)	Richard Beardsell	Great Britain	21.97
M35 200 Meters; Wind: +1.1	2nd place, silver medalist(s)	Antwon Dussett	United States	22.00
M35 200 Meters; Wind: +1.1	3rd place, bronze medalist(s)	Jochen Gippert	Germany	22.22
M40 200 Meters; Wind: +0.2
M40 200 Meters; Wind: +0.2	1st place, gold medalist(s)	Tamunonengiye-Ofori Ossai	Great Britain	21.75
M40 200 Meters; Wind: +0.2	2nd place, silver medalist(s)	Junichi Watanabe	Japan	22.33
M40 200 Meters; Wind: +0.2	3rd place, bronze medalist(s)	Albert St'Louis	Trinidad and Tobago	22.67
M45 200 Meters; Wind: +1.2
M45 200 Meters; Wind: +1.2	1st place, gold medalist(s)	Darren Scott	Great Britain	22.72
M45 200 Meters; Wind: +1.2	2nd place, silver medalist(s)	Jason Carty	Great Britain	22.83
M45 200 Meters; Wind: +1.2	3rd place, bronze medalist(s)	Lee Bridges	United States	22.89
M50 200 Meters; Wind: +1.6
M50 200 Meters; Wind: +1.6	1st place, gold medalist(s)	Robert Moen	Netherlands	23.03
M50 200 Meters; Wind: +1.6	2nd place, silver medalist(s)	Roland Gröger	Germany	23.23
M50 200 Meters; Wind: +1.6	3rd place, bronze medalist(s)	Alfonso De Feo	Italy	23.33
M55 200 Meters; Wind: +1.6
M55 200 Meters; Wind: +1.6	1st place, gold medalist(s)	Bruno Dupuy	France	24.54
M55 200 Meters; Wind: +1.6	2nd place, silver medalist(s)	Ricardo Huskisson	Great Britain	24.84
M55 200 Meters; Wind: +1.6	3rd place, bronze medalist(s)	William Yelverton	United States	25.08
M60 200 Meters; Wind: +1.2
M60 200 Meters; Wind: +1.2	1st place, gold medalist(s)	Steve Peters	Great Britain	24.54
M60 200 Meters; Wind: +1.2	2nd place, silver medalist(s)	Reinhard Michelchen	Germany	25.32
M60 200 Meters; Wind: +1.2	3rd place, bronze medalist(s)	Alasdair Ross	Great Britain	25.38
M65 200 Meters; Wind: +0.8
M65 200 Meters; Wind: +0.8	1st place, gold medalist(s)	Wojciech Seidel	Poland	26.75
M65 200 Meters; Wind: +0.8	2nd place, silver medalist(s)	Carroll Blake	United States	27.47
M65 200 Meters; Wind: +0.8	3rd place, bronze medalist(s)	Daniel Débonnaire	France	27.60
M70 200 Meters; Wind: +0.4
M70 200 Meters; Wind: +0.4	1st place, gold medalist(s)	Glyn Sutton	Great Britain	26.47 WR
M70 200 Meters; Wind: +0.4	2nd place, silver medalist(s)	Peter Crombie	Australia	27.24
M70 200 Meters; Wind: +0.4	3rd place, bronze medalist(s)	Kenton Brown	United States	27.57
M75 200 Meters; Wind: +0.7
M75 200 Meters; Wind: +0.7	1st place, gold medalist(s)	Guido Müller	Germany	28.15
M75 200 Meters; Wind: +0.7	2nd place, silver medalist(s)	Aimo Mikkola	Finland	29.42
M75 200 Meters; Wind: +0.7	3rd place, bronze medalist(s)	Robert Lida	United States	29.61
M80 200 Meters; Wind: -0.2
M80 200 Meters; Wind: -0.2	1st place, gold medalist(s)	Monty Hacker	South Africa	31.82
M80 200 Meters; Wind: -0.2	2nd place, silver medalist(s)	Hans Bloechlinger	Switzerland	32.47
M80 200 Meters; Wind: -0.2	3rd place, bronze medalist(s)	Anatoly Zorin	Russia	32.95
M85 200 Meters; Wind: -0.1
M85 200 Meters; Wind: -0.1	1st place, gold medalist(s)	Yoshiyuki Shimizu	Brazil	35.71
M85 200 Meters; Wind: -0.1	2nd place, silver medalist(s)	Luis Hernando Osorio Berrio	Colombia	38.29
M85 200 Meters; Wind: -0.1	3rd place, bronze medalist(s)	Michel Claverie	France	38.63
M90 200 Meters; Wind: +0.8
M90 200 Meters; Wind: +0.8	1st place, gold medalist(s)	Mamoru Ussami	Brazil	42.98
M90 200 Meters; Wind: +0.8	2nd place, silver medalist(s)	Hugo Antonio Delgado Flores	Peru	42.98
M90 200 Meters; Wind: +0.8	3rd place, bronze medalist(s)	James Sinclair	Australia	43.30
M95 200 Meters; Wind: +0.8
M95 200 Meters; Wind: +0.8	1st place, gold medalist(s)	Charles Eugster	Great Britain	55.53

=== 400 Meters ===
Event	Pos	Athlete	Country	Result
W35 400 Meters; Video on YouTube
W35 400 Meters; Video on YouTube	1st place, gold medalist(s)	Susie McLoughlin	Great Britain	58.25
W35 400 Meters; Video on YouTube	2nd place, silver medalist(s)	Malgorzata Gasowska	Poland	58.90
W35 400 Meters; Video on YouTube	3rd place, bronze medalist(s)	Susan Young	Great Britain	59.07
W40 400 Meters; Video on YouTube
W40 400 Meters; Video on YouTube	1st place, gold medalist(s)	Alisha Natasha Fortune	Guyana	56.88
W40 400 Meters; Video on YouTube	2nd place, silver medalist(s)	Emanuela Baggiolini	Italy	57.96
W40 400 Meters; Video on YouTube	3rd place, bronze medalist(s)	Nina Anderson	Great Britain	58.02
W45 400 Meters; Video on YouTube
W45 400 Meters; Video on YouTube	1st place, gold medalist(s)	Janelle Delaney	Australia	57.37
W45 400 Meters; Video on YouTube	2nd place, silver medalist(s)	Emmanuelle McGowan	United States	59.02
W45 400 Meters; Video on YouTube	3rd place, bronze medalist(s)	Esther Colas	Spain	1:00.10
W50 400 Meters; Video on YouTube
W50 400 Meters; Video on YouTube	1st place, gold medalist(s)	Elizabeth Wilson	New Zealand	1:01.88
W50 400 Meters; Video on YouTube	2nd place, silver medalist(s)	Virginia Mitchell	Great Britain	1:02.14
W50 400 Meters; Video on YouTube	3rd place, bronze medalist(s)	Julie Forster	Australia	1:03.39
W55 400 Meters; Video on YouTube
W55 400 Meters; Video on YouTube	1st place, gold medalist(s)	Daphne Sluys	United States	1:07.32
W55 400 Meters; Video on YouTube	2nd place, silver medalist(s)	Dominique Pozzo Charvier	France	1:08.79
W55 400 Meters; Video on YouTube	3rd place, bronze medalist(s)	Edith Caux	France	1:09.32
W60 400 Meters; Video on YouTube
W60 400 Meters; Video on YouTube	1st place, gold medalist(s)	Caroline Powell	Great Britain	1:04.86 (1:04.31 WR)
W60 400 Meters; Video on YouTube	2nd place, silver medalist(s)	Lilly Wizén	Sweden	1:10.04
W60 400 Meters; Video on YouTube	3rd place, bronze medalist(s)	Edna Roe	Great Britain	1:10.99
W65 400 Meters; Video on YouTube
W65 400 Meters; Video on YouTube	1st place, gold medalist(s)	Evelyn Peake	Australia	1:12.43
W65 400 Meters; Video on YouTube	2nd place, silver medalist(s)	Rosalind Tabor	Great Britain	1:14.13
W65 400 Meters; Video on YouTube	3rd place, bronze medalist(s)	Paula Moorhouse	Australia	1:16.09
W70 400 Meters; Video on YouTube
W70 400 Meters; Video on YouTube	1st place, gold medalist(s)	Marge Allison	Australia	1:17.33
W70 400 Meters; Video on YouTube	2nd place, silver medalist(s)	Riet Jonkers-Slegers	Netherlands	1:20.86
W70 400 Meters; Video on YouTube	3rd place, bronze medalist(s)	Peggy Macliver	Australia	1:20.92
W75 400 Meters; Video on YouTube
W75 400 Meters; Video on YouTube	1st place, gold medalist(s)	Kathleen Stewart	Great Britain	1:25.74
W75 400 Meters; Video on YouTube	2nd place, silver medalist(s)	Leontine Vitola	Latvia	1:27.40
W75 400 Meters; Video on YouTube	3rd place, bronze medalist(s)	Jean Daprano	United States	1:31.80
W80 400 Meters
W80 400 Meters	1st place, gold medalist(s)	Emma Maria Mazzenga	Italy	1:33.31
W80 400 Meters	2nd place, silver medalist(s)	Irene Obera	United States	1:34.90
W80 400 Meters	3rd place, bronze medalist(s)	Fei-Mei Chou	United States	1:54.95
W85 400 Meters
W85 400 Meters	1st place, gold medalist(s)	Ernestina Ramirez Garcia	Mexico	2:03.74
W85 400 Meters	2nd place, silver medalist(s)	Maria Pastora Londoño	Colombia	2:38.54
W90 400 Meters
W90 400 Meters	1st place, gold medalist(s)	Emilia García de Fontán	Colombia	2:46.56 WR
M35 400 Meters; Video on YouTube
M35 400 Meters; Video on YouTube	1st place, gold medalist(s)	Richard Beardsell	Great Britain	49.18
M35 400 Meters; Video on YouTube	2nd place, silver medalist(s)	Lawrence Baird	Great Britain	49.40
M35 400 Meters; Video on YouTube	3rd place, bronze medalist(s)	David Brown	Great Britain	49.54
M40 400 Meters; Video on YouTube
M40 400 Meters; Video on YouTube	1st place, gold medalist(s)	Mattias Sunneborn	Sweden	49.34
M40 400 Meters; Video on YouTube	2nd place, silver medalist(s)	Graeme Harrison	Great Britain	49.81
M40 400 Meters; Video on YouTube	3rd place, bronze medalist(s)	Mike Coogan	Great Britain	50.72
M45 400 Meters; Video on YouTube
M45 400 Meters; Video on YouTube	1st place, gold medalist(s)	Lee Bridges	United States	50.79
M45 400 Meters; Video on YouTube	2nd place, silver medalist(s)	Michael Gardiner	Great Britain	51.27
M45 400 Meters; Video on YouTube	3rd place, bronze medalist(s)	Andrew Wilcox	Australia	51.44
M50 400 Meters; Video on YouTube
M50 400 Meters; Video on YouTube	1st place, gold medalist(s)	Roland Gröger	Germany	52.13
M50 400 Meters; Video on YouTube	2nd place, silver medalist(s)	Francois Boda	United States	52.63
M50 400 Meters; Video on YouTube	3rd place, bronze medalist(s)	Getulio Echeandia	Puerto Rico	52.98
M55 400 Meters; Video on YouTube
M55 400 Meters; Video on YouTube	1st place, gold medalist(s)	Benoît Zavattero	France	54.46
M55 400 Meters; Video on YouTube	2nd place, silver medalist(s)	Israel Ferreira de Melo	Brazil	55.04
M55 400 Meters; Video on YouTube	3rd place, bronze medalist(s)	William Yelverton	United States	55.30
M60 400 Meters; Video on YouTube
M60 400 Meters; Video on YouTube	1st place, gold medalist(s)	Steve Peters	Great Britain	55.86
M60 400 Meters; Video on YouTube	2nd place, silver medalist(s)	Alasdair Ross	Great Britain	56.53
M60 400 Meters; Video on YouTube	3rd place, bronze medalist(s)	Reinhard Michelchen	Germany	56.83
M65 400 Meters; Video on YouTube
M65 400 Meters; Video on YouTube	1st place, gold medalist(s)	Masahiko Yamasaki	Japan	1:01.08
M65 400 Meters; Video on YouTube	2nd place, silver medalist(s)	John Lamb	Australia	1:01.38
M65 400 Meters; Video on YouTube	3rd place, bronze medalist(s)	Steven Hardison	United States	1:01.86
M70 400 Meters; Video on YouTube
M70 400 Meters; Video on YouTube	1st place, gold medalist(s)	Hans-Jürgen Frühauf	Germany	1:02.66
M70 400 Meters; Video on YouTube	2nd place, silver medalist(s)	Roger Pierce	United States	1:03.36
M70 400 Meters; Video on YouTube	3rd place, bronze medalist(s)	Peter Crombie	Australia	1:03.56
M75 400 Meters
M75 400 Meters	1st place, gold medalist(s)	Guido Müller	Germany	1:06.86
M75 400 Meters	2nd place, silver medalist(s)	Karl Jakob	Germany	1:09.90
M75 400 Meters	3rd place, bronze medalist(s)	Dr. Hartmann Knorr	Germany	1:10.90
M80 400 Meters
M80 400 Meters	1st place, gold medalist(s)	David Carr	Australia	1:18.47
M80 400 Meters	2nd place, silver medalist(s)	Kosmas Kapasakalis	Greece	1:19.31
M80 400 Meters	3rd place, bronze medalist(s)	Horst Dr. Hufnagel	Germany	1:21.67
M85 400 Meters
M85 400 Meters	1st place, gold medalist(s)	Yoshiyuki Shimizu	Brazil	1:23.68
M85 400 Meters	2nd place, silver medalist(s)	Luis Hernando Osorio Berrio	Colombia	1:26.91
M85 400 Meters	3rd place, bronze medalist(s)	Unto Mattsson	Finland	1:27.75
M90 400 Meters
M90 400 Meters	1st place, gold medalist(s)	José Canelo	Portugal	1:53.90
M90 400 Meters	2nd place, silver medalist(s)	James Sinclair	Australia	1:54.67
M90 400 Meters	3rd place, bronze medalist(s)	Mamoru Ussami	Brazil	2:18.85

=== 800 Meters ===
Event	Pos	Athlete	Country	Result
W35 800 Meters; Video on YouTube
W35 800 Meters; Video on YouTube	1st place, gold medalist(s)	Kelly Neely	Ireland	2:10.04
W35 800 Meters; Video on YouTube	2nd place, silver medalist(s)	Denise Toner	Ireland	2:14.59
W35 800 Meters; Video on YouTube	3rd place, bronze medalist(s)	Nina Howorka	Slovakia	2:18.55
W40 800 Meters
W40 800 Meters	1st place, gold medalist(s)	Louise Rudd	Great Britain	2:15.69
W40 800 Meters	2nd place, silver medalist(s)	Emanuela Baggiolini	Italy	2:16.16
W40 800 Meters	3rd place, bronze medalist(s)	Manon Mensink	Netherlands	2:18.41
W45 800 Meters; Video on YouTube
W45 800 Meters; Video on YouTube	1st place, gold medalist(s)	Nicole Weijling-Dissel	Netherlands	2:18.73
W45 800 Meters; Video on YouTube	2nd place, silver medalist(s)	Tanja Nehme	Germany	2:20.54
W45 800 Meters; Video on YouTube	3rd place, bronze medalist(s)	Christine Gentile	United States	2:22.15
W50 800 Meters; Video on YouTube
W50 800 Meters; Video on YouTube	1st place, gold medalist(s)	Zofia Wieciorkowska	Poland	2:26.63
W50 800 Meters; Video on YouTube	2nd place, silver medalist(s)	Annie Bunting	Canada	2:28.35
W50 800 Meters; Video on YouTube	3rd place, bronze medalist(s)	Marilyn Georgel	France	2:32.76
W55 800 Meters; Video on YouTube
W55 800 Meters; Video on YouTube	1st place, gold medalist(s)	Karin Wåhlstedt	Sweden	2:36.90
W55 800 Meters; Video on YouTube	2nd place, silver medalist(s)	Lesley Chaplin	United States	2:38.12
W55 800 Meters; Video on YouTube	3rd place, bronze medalist(s)	Karen Brooks	Great Britain	2:39.76
W60 800 Meters; Video on YouTube
W60 800 Meters; Video on YouTube	1st place, gold medalist(s)	Jeanette Flynn	Australia	2:41.50
W60 800 Meters; Video on YouTube	2nd place, silver medalist(s)	Lilly Wizén	Sweden	2:46.10
W60 800 Meters; Video on YouTube	3rd place, bronze medalist(s)	Rita Schubert	Germany	2:48.32
W65 800 Meters; Video on YouTube
W65 800 Meters; Video on YouTube	1st place, gold medalist(s)	Rosalind Tabor	Great Britain	2:49.21
W65 800 Meters; Video on YouTube	2nd place, silver medalist(s)	Komae Kyotani	Japan	2:51.08
W65 800 Meters; Video on YouTube	3rd place, bronze medalist(s)	Ingerlise Villum Jensen	Denmark	2:53.48
W70 800 Meters; Video on YouTube
W70 800 Meters; Video on YouTube	1st place, gold medalist(s)	Riet Jonkers-Slegers	Netherlands	3:14.06
W70 800 Meters; Video on YouTube	2nd place, silver medalist(s)	Rigmor Osterlund	Denmark	3:17.45
W70 800 Meters; Video on YouTube	3rd place, bronze medalist(s)	Anne Lang	Australia	3:19.62
W75 800 Meters
W75 800 Meters	1st place, gold medalist(s)	Yolande Marchal	France	3:22.90
W75 800 Meters	2nd place, silver medalist(s)	Lydia Ritter	Germany	3:24.96
W75 800 Meters	3rd place, bronze medalist(s)	Kathleen Stewart	Great Britain	3:27.45
W80 800 Meters
W80 800 Meters	1st place, gold medalist(s)	Lynne Hurrell	United States	3:57.18
W80 800 Meters	2nd place, silver medalist(s)	Helly Visser	Canada	4:02.86
W80 800 Meters	3rd place, bronze medalist(s)	Mary Harada	United States	5:27.84
W85 800 Meters
W85 800 Meters	1st place, gold medalist(s)	Melitta Czerwenka-Nagel	Germany	4:15.99 WR
M35 800 Meters; Video on YouTube
M35 800 Meters; Video on YouTube	1st place, gold medalist(s)	Juan Ramon Pous	Spain	1:54.37
M35 800 Meters; Video on YouTube	2nd place, silver medalist(s)	Olivier Baldacchino	France	1:55.01
M35 800 Meters; Video on YouTube	3rd place, bronze medalist(s)	Bruno Anicet	France	1:55.66
M40 800 Meters
M40 800 Meters	1st place, gold medalist(s)	Anthony Whiteman	Great Britain	1:51.01
M40 800 Meters	2nd place, silver medalist(s)	Raul Aragon	Spain	1:56.57
M40 800 Meters	3rd place, bronze medalist(s)	Mark O'Shea	Ireland	1:57.19
M45 800 Meters; Video on YouTube
M45 800 Meters; Video on YouTube	1st place, gold medalist(s)	Hubert Leineweber	Germany	2:02.31
M45 800 Meters; Video on YouTube	2nd place, silver medalist(s)	Hugo Dante Berra	Argentina	2:02.59
M45 800 Meters; Video on YouTube	3rd place, bronze medalist(s)	Nicholas Berra	United States	2:02.66
M50 800 Meters; Video on YouTube
M50 800 Meters; Video on YouTube	1st place, gold medalist(s)	David Heath	Great Britain	2:01.93
M50 800 Meters; Video on YouTube	2nd place, silver medalist(s)	Gunnar Durén	Sweden	2:04.85
M50 800 Meters; Video on YouTube	3rd place, bronze medalist(s)	Michael Sherar	Canada	2:04.91
M55 800 Meters; Video on YouTube
M55 800 Meters; Video on YouTube	1st place, gold medalist(s)	Anselm LeBourne	United States	2:04.79
M55 800 Meters; Video on YouTube	2nd place, silver medalist(s)	Ray Knerr	United States	2:05.29
M55 800 Meters; Video on YouTube	3rd place, bronze medalist(s)	Benoît Zavattero	France	2:05.99
M60 800 Meters; Video on YouTube
M60 800 Meters; Video on YouTube	1st place, gold medalist(s)	Joe Gough	Ireland	2:15.90
M60 800 Meters; Video on YouTube	2nd place, silver medalist(s)	Omar Clok	Uruguay	2:16.79
M60 800 Meters; Video on YouTube	3rd place, bronze medalist(s)	Carlos Humberto Loaiza Londoño	Colombia	2:17.10
M65 800 Meters; Video on YouTube
M65 800 Meters; Video on YouTube	1st place, gold medalist(s)	Giovanni Finielli	Italy	2:23.06
M65 800 Meters; Video on YouTube	2nd place, silver medalist(s)	Hans Smeets	Netherlands	2:23.67
M65 800 Meters; Video on YouTube	3rd place, bronze medalist(s)	Alain Aguero	France	2:24.09
M70 800 Meters; Video on YouTube
M70 800 Meters; Video on YouTube	1st place, gold medalist(s)	Winston Laing	Great Britain	2:35.76
M70 800 Meters; Video on YouTube	2nd place, silver medalist(s)	Donald Mathewson	Australia	2:35.85
M70 800 Meters; Video on YouTube	3rd place, bronze medalist(s)	Frederick Lindsley	United States	2:37.71
M75 800 Meters; Video on YouTube
M75 800 Meters; Video on YouTube	1st place, gold medalist(s)	Jean-Louis Esnault	France	2:36.84
M75 800 Meters; Video on YouTube	2nd place, silver medalist(s)	John Newcombe	Great Britain	2:47.08
M75 800 Meters; Video on YouTube	3rd place, bronze medalist(s)	Dr. Hartmann Knorr	Germany	2:47.94
M80 800 Meters
M80 800 Meters	1st place, gold medalist(s)	David Carr	Australia	3:07.75
M80 800 Meters	2nd place, silver medalist(s)	Ryosuke Takahara	Japan	3:18.75
M80 800 Meters	3rd place, bronze medalist(s)	Bruno Baggia	Italy	3:18.88
M85 800 Meters
M85 800 Meters	1st place, gold medalist(s)	Christian Larcher	France	4:02.04
M85 800 Meters	2nd place, silver medalist(s)	Luis Humberto Torres Rosa	Puerto Rico	4:27.14
M85 800 Meters	3rd place, bronze medalist(s)	Eckart Maas	Germany	4:29.09
M90 800 Meters
M90 800 Meters	1st place, gold medalist(s)	José Canelo	Portugal	4:45.79

=== 1500 Meters ===
Event	Pos	Athlete	Country	Result
W35 1500 Meters; Video on YouTube
W35 1500 Meters; Video on YouTube	1st place, gold medalist(s)	Susana Arrua	Spain	4:41.24
W35 1500 Meters; Video on YouTube	2nd place, silver medalist(s)	Rachael Burns	Great Britain	4:43.45
W35 1500 Meters; Video on YouTube	3rd place, bronze medalist(s)	Joanne Locker	Great Britain	4:44.60
W40 1500 Meters; Video on YouTube
W40 1500 Meters; Video on YouTube	1st place, gold medalist(s)	Louise Rudd	Great Britain	4:36.70
W40 1500 Meters; Video on YouTube	2nd place, silver medalist(s)	Jennifer St Jean	United States	4:37.08
W40 1500 Meters; Video on YouTube	3rd place, bronze medalist(s)	Manon Mensink	Netherlands	4:43.30
W45 1500 Meters
W45 1500 Meters	1st place, gold medalist(s)	Nicole Weijling-Dissel	Netherlands	4:42.94
W45 1500 Meters	2nd place, silver medalist(s)	Tanja Nehme	Germany	4:51.02
W45 1500 Meters	3rd place, bronze medalist(s)	Mª Dolores Jimenez Guardeño	Spain	4:52.65
W50 1500 Meters; Video on YouTube
W50 1500 Meters; Video on YouTube	1st place, gold medalist(s)	Zofia Wieciorkowska	Poland	4:58.50
W50 1500 Meters; Video on YouTube	2nd place, silver medalist(s)	Nele Hillewaere	Belgium	5:01.36
W50 1500 Meters; Video on YouTube	3rd place, bronze medalist(s)	Annie Bunting	Canada	5:01.73
W55 1500 Meters; Video on YouTube
W55 1500 Meters; Video on YouTube	1st place, gold medalist(s)	Silke Schmidt	Germany	5:00.92
W55 1500 Meters; Video on YouTube	2nd place, silver medalist(s)	Ella Witjes	Netherlands	5:07.99
W55 1500 Meters; Video on YouTube	3rd place, bronze medalist(s)	Karin Wåhlstedt	Sweden	5:08.68
W60 1500 Meters; Video on YouTube
W60 1500 Meters; Video on YouTube	1st place, gold medalist(s)	Lidia Zentner	Germany	5:25.36
W60 1500 Meters; Video on YouTube	2nd place, silver medalist(s)	Anne Ryan	Australia	5:37.18
W60 1500 Meters; Video on YouTube	3rd place, bronze medalist(s)	Jeanette Flynn	Australia	5:38.12
W65 1500 Meters; Video on YouTube
W65 1500 Meters; Video on YouTube	1st place, gold medalist(s)	Angela Copson	Great Britain	5:32.97
W65 1500 Meters; Video on YouTube	2nd place, silver medalist(s)	Rosalind Tabor	Great Britain	5:45.03
W65 1500 Meters; Video on YouTube	3rd place, bronze medalist(s)	Komae Kyotani	Japan	5:49.32
W70 1500 Meters; Video on YouTube
W70 1500 Meters; Video on YouTube	1st place, gold medalist(s)	Lavinia Petrie	Australia	6:13.95
W70 1500 Meters; Video on YouTube	2nd place, silver medalist(s)	Rigmor Osterlund	Denmark	6:36.97
W70 1500 Meters; Video on YouTube	3rd place, bronze medalist(s)	Christiane Jolimet-Ruzic	France	7:03.81
W75 1500 Meters; Video on YouTube
W75 1500 Meters; Video on YouTube	1st place, gold medalist(s)	Lydia Ritter	Germany	7:06.95
W75 1500 Meters; Video on YouTube	2nd place, silver medalist(s)	Gilda Fournival	France	7:09.63
W75 1500 Meters; Video on YouTube	3rd place, bronze medalist(s)	Lorraine Lopes	Australia	7:16.05
W80 1500 Meters; Video on YouTube
W80 1500 Meters; Video on YouTube	1st place, gold medalist(s)	Lynne Hurrell	United States	7:56.41
W80 1500 Meters; Video on YouTube	2nd place, silver medalist(s)	Helly Visser	Canada	8:03.65
W85 1500 Meters; Video on YouTube
W85 1500 Meters; Video on YouTube	1st place, gold medalist(s)	Melitta Czerwenka-Nagel	Germany	8:50.42 WR
M35 1500 Meters
M35 1500 Meters	1st place, gold medalist(s)	Alberto Sabado	Spain	4:02.66
M35 1500 Meters	1st place, gold medalist(s)	Artur Kern	Poland	4:02.66
M35 1500 Meters	3rd place, bronze medalist(s)	Samir Tatah	France	4:03.59
M40 1500 Meters; Video on YouTube
M40 1500 Meters; Video on YouTube	1st place, gold medalist(s)	Anthony Whiteman	Great Britain	4:00.97
M40 1500 Meters; Video on YouTube	2nd place, silver medalist(s)	Fernando Lorenzo Marcos	Spain	4:06.90
M40 1500 Meters; Video on YouTube	3rd place, bronze medalist(s)	Dean Richardson	Great Britain	4:06.94
M45 1500 Meters; Video on YouTube
M45 1500 Meters; Video on YouTube	1st place, gold medalist(s)	David Hellinx	Belgium	4:08.36
M45 1500 Meters; Video on YouTube	2nd place, silver medalist(s)	Hubert Leineweber	Germany	4:10.09
M45 1500 Meters; Video on YouTube	3rd place, bronze medalist(s)	David Cowlishaw	Great Britain	4:13.11
M50 1500 Meters; Video on YouTube
M50 1500 Meters; Video on YouTube	1st place, gold medalist(s)	David Heath	Great Britain	4:01.54
M50 1500 Meters; Video on YouTube	2nd place, silver medalist(s)	Carmelo Anton	Spain	4:15.86
M50 1500 Meters; Video on YouTube	3rd place, bronze medalist(s)	Mike Trees	Great Britain	4:17.00
M55 1500 Meters; Video on YouTube
M55 1500 Meters; Video on YouTube	1st place, gold medalist(s)	Anselm LeBourne	United States	4:22.21
M55 1500 Meters; Video on YouTube	2nd place, silver medalist(s)	Ray Knerr	United States	4:22.49
M55 1500 Meters; Video on YouTube	3rd place, bronze medalist(s)	Antonio Morales	Spain	4:25.17
M60 1500 Meters
M60 1500 Meters	1st place, gold medalist(s)	Daniel Gonzalez	Spain	4:36.00
M60 1500 Meters	2nd place, silver medalist(s)	Jose Medeiros Batista	Brazil	4:36.73
M60 1500 Meters	3rd place, bronze medalist(s)	Joe Gough	Ireland	4:38.36
M65 1500 Meters
M65 1500 Meters	1st place, gold medalist(s)	Giovanni Finielli	Italy	4:52.08
M65 1500 Meters	2nd place, silver medalist(s)	Hans Smeets	Netherlands	4:53.09
M65 1500 Meters	3rd place, bronze medalist(s)	Fernando Chamusca	Portugal	4:57.91
M70 1500 Meters; Video on YouTube
M70 1500 Meters; Video on YouTube	1st place, gold medalist(s)	Donald Mathewson	Australia	5:14.40
M70 1500 Meters; Video on YouTube	2nd place, silver medalist(s)	Peter Giles	Great Britain	5:16.22
M70 1500 Meters; Video on YouTube	3rd place, bronze medalist(s)	Paul Perry	United States	5:20.17
M75 1500 Meters; Video on YouTube
M75 1500 Meters; Video on YouTube	1st place, gold medalist(s)	Jean-Louis Esnault	France	5:29.42
M75 1500 Meters; Video on YouTube	2nd place, silver medalist(s)	Barry Swindells	Great Britain	5:57.39
M75 1500 Meters; Video on YouTube	3rd place, bronze medalist(s)	J.Jesus Guzman Vazquez	Mexico	5:58.98
M80 1500 Meters; Video on YouTube
M80 1500 Meters; Video on YouTube	1st place, gold medalist(s)	David Carr	Australia	6:28.32
M80 1500 Meters; Video on YouTube	2nd place, silver medalist(s)	Bruno Baggia	Italy	6:29.25
M80 1500 Meters; Video on YouTube	3rd place, bronze medalist(s)	Roger Davies	Canada	6:31.08
M85 1500 Meters
M85 1500 Meters	1st place, gold medalist(s)	Christian Larcher	France	7:57.18
M85 1500 Meters	2nd place, silver medalist(s)	Hisashi Nakagawa	Japan	8:11.65
M85 1500 Meters	3rd place, bronze medalist(s)	Luis Humberto Torres Rosa	Puerto Rico	10:35.94
M90 1500 Meters
M90 1500 Meters	1st place, gold medalist(s)	José Canelo	Portugal	9:12.66

=== 5000 Meters ===
Event	Pos	Athlete	Country	Result
W35 5000 Meters
W35 5000 Meters	1st place, gold medalist(s)	Fatiha Idmhand	France	18:10.25
W35 5000 Meters	2nd place, silver medalist(s)	Louise Brown	Spain	18:14.59
W35 5000 Meters	3rd place, bronze medalist(s)	Geraldine Simbola	France	18:22.66
W40 5000 Meters
W40 5000 Meters	1st place, gold medalist(s)	Paula Tukiainen	Finland	18:43.47
W40 5000 Meters	2nd place, silver medalist(s)	Maria McCarthy	Ireland	18:55.63
W40 5000 Meters	3rd place, bronze medalist(s)	Cathy Mc Court	Ireland	19:35.59
W45 5000 Meters
W45 5000 Meters	1st place, gold medalist(s)	Mareike Ressing	Germany	18:11.39
W45 5000 Meters	2nd place, silver medalist(s)	Nathalie Loubele	Belgium	18:33.34
W45 5000 Meters	3rd place, bronze medalist(s)	Sylvie Deletang	France	18:37.66
W50 5000 Meters
W50 5000 Meters	1st place, gold medalist(s)	Nadia Dandolo	Italy	18:10.21
W50 5000 Meters	2nd place, silver medalist(s)	Angela Carpini	Australia	18:33.45
W50 5000 Meters	3rd place, bronze medalist(s)	Niamh O'Sullivan	Ireland	19:06.18
W55 5000 Meters
W55 5000 Meters	1st place, gold medalist(s)	Silke Schmidt	Germany	18:15.54
W55 5000 Meters	2nd place, silver medalist(s)	Carla Ophorst-Marrewijk	Netherlands	19:24.52
W55 5000 Meters	3rd place, bronze medalist(s)	Ella Witjes	Netherlands	20:15.65
W60 5000 Meters
W60 5000 Meters	1st place, gold medalist(s)	Lidia Zentner	Germany	19:57.32
W60 5000 Meters	2nd place, silver medalist(s)	Carmel Parnell Carmel	Ireland	20:13.66
W60 5000 Meters	3rd place, bronze medalist(s)	Alison Bourgeois	Great Britain	21:41.19
W65 5000 Meters
W65 5000 Meters	1st place, gold medalist(s)	Angela Copson	Great Britain	21:51.98
W65 5000 Meters	2nd place, silver medalist(s)	Waltraud Egger	Italy	22:07.54
W65 5000 Meters	3rd place, bronze medalist(s)	Annik Kroes	France	22:12.83
W70 5000 Meters
W70 5000 Meters	1st place, gold medalist(s)	Lavinia Petrie	Australia	22:01.27
W70 5000 Meters	2nd place, silver medalist(s)	Sieglinde Schmieder	Austria	23:50.26
W70 5000 Meters	3rd place, bronze medalist(s)	Xuhua Chen	China	24:37.18
W75 5000 Meters
W75 5000 Meters	1st place, gold medalist(s)	Joaquina Flores	Portugal	26:19.02
W75 5000 Meters	2nd place, silver medalist(s)	Lorraine Lopes	Australia	27:03.79
W75 5000 Meters	3rd place, bronze medalist(s)	Monique Castagnet	France	28:14.51
W80 5000 Meters
W80 5000 Meters	1st place, gold medalist(s)	Helly Visser	Canada	30:41.68
W80 5000 Meters	2nd place, silver medalist(s)	Margarida Stella Hochstatter	Brazil	31:30.99
W80 5000 Meters	3rd place, bronze medalist(s)	Mary Harada	United States	38:02.70
W85 5000 Meters
W85 5000 Meters	1st place, gold medalist(s)	Melitta Czerwenka-Nagel	Germany	33:35.62
M35 5000 Meters
M35 5000 Meters	1st place, gold medalist(s)	Alexander Diaz Rodriguez	Belgium	14:59.47
M35 5000 Meters	2nd place, silver medalist(s)	Javier Martinez	Spain	15:01.07
M35 5000 Meters	3rd place, bronze medalist(s)	Andreas Lundqvist	Sweden	15:21.84
M40 5000 Meters
M40 5000 Meters	1st place, gold medalist(s)	Jose Luis Blanco Quevedo	Spain	15:40.88
M40 5000 Meters	2nd place, silver medalist(s)	Fidel Ruiz	Spain	15:41.83
M40 5000 Meters	3rd place, bronze medalist(s)	Robert Celinski	Poland	15:44.94
M45 5000 Meters
M45 5000 Meters	1st place, gold medalist(s)	César Javier Troncoso Troncoso	Argentina	15:38.82
M45 5000 Meters	2nd place, silver medalist(s)	Valerio Brignone	Italy	15:40.03
M45 5000 Meters	3rd place, bronze medalist(s)	Jean Philippe Vindex	France	15:51.80
M50 5000 Meters
M50 5000 Meters	1st place, gold medalist(s)	Ben Reynolds	Great Britain	15:47.07
M50 5000 Meters	2nd place, silver medalist(s)	Guy Bracken	Great Britain	15:57.05
M50 5000 Meters	3rd place, bronze medalist(s)	Michael Traynor	Ireland	15:57.71
M55 5000 Meters
M55 5000 Meters	1st place, gold medalist(s)	Sergey Polikarpov	Kazakhstan	16:05.75
M55 5000 Meters	2nd place, silver medalist(s)	Ihar Dolbik	Belarus	16:43.44
M55 5000 Meters	3rd place, bronze medalist(s)	Daniel King	United States	17:04.14
M60 5000 Meters
M60 5000 Meters	1st place, gold medalist(s)	Marc Schmitt	France	17:07.49
M60 5000 Meters	2nd place, silver medalist(s)	Sergio Fernandez	Spain	17:21.59
M60 5000 Meters	3rd place, bronze medalist(s)	Jose Del Carmen Ramirez Riaño	Colombia	17:23.56
M65 5000 Meters
M65 5000 Meters	1st place, gold medalist(s)	Bert Schalkwijk	Netherlands	18:23.50
M65 5000 Meters	2nd place, silver medalist(s)	Mario Vargas	Chile	18:28.11
M65 5000 Meters	3rd place, bronze medalist(s)	Gregori Fuks	Israel	18:58.62
M70 5000 Meters
M70 5000 Meters	1st place, gold medalist(s)	Albert Anderegg	Switzerland	19:48.88
M70 5000 Meters	2nd place, silver medalist(s)	Dirk Beeuwsaert	Belgium	19:52.13
M70 5000 Meters	3rd place, bronze medalist(s)	Martin Ford	Great Britain	19:57.40
M75 5000 Meters
M75 5000 Meters	1st place, gold medalist(s)	Jean-Louis Esnault	France	20:58.80
M75 5000 Meters	2nd place, silver medalist(s)	J.Jesus Guzman Vazquez	Mexico	22:09.22
M75 5000 Meters	3rd place, bronze medalist(s)	Joachim Knorr	Germany	22:09.27
M80 5000 Meters
M80 5000 Meters	1st place, gold medalist(s)	Roger Davies	Canada	25:19.69
M80 5000 Meters	2nd place, silver medalist(s)	Bruno Baggia	Italy	25:21.41
M80 5000 Meters	3rd place, bronze medalist(s)	Ryosuke Takahara	Japan	25:44.83
M85 5000 Meters
M85 5000 Meters	1st place, gold medalist(s)	Christian Larcher	France	29:04.69
M85 5000 Meters	2nd place, silver medalist(s)	Irwin Barrett-Lennard	Australia	33:03.58
M85 5000 Meters	3rd place, bronze medalist(s)	Luis Humberto Torres Rosa	Puerto Rico	44:37.07
M90 5000 Meters
M90 5000 Meters	1st place, gold medalist(s)	José Canelo	Portugal	35:42.03
M90 5000 Meters	2nd place, silver medalist(s)	Semion Simkin	Israel	39:47.21
M90 5000 Meters	3rd place, bronze medalist(s)	Lorenzo Juvenal Perez	Argentina	45:59.18

=== 10,000 Meters ===
Event	Pos	Athlete	Country	Result
W35 10K
W35 10K	1st place, gold medalist(s)	Patrycja Wlodarczyk	Poland	37:05.31
W35 10K	2nd place, silver medalist(s)	Melanie Klein-Arndt	Germany	37:23.69
W35 10K	3rd place, bronze medalist(s)	Irene Reichl	Austria	38:02.66
W40 10K
W40 10K	1st place, gold medalist(s)	Catherine Thomas Pesqueux	France	36:18.24
W40 10K	2nd place, silver medalist(s)	Paula Tukiainen	Finland	38:17.33
W40 10K	3rd place, bronze medalist(s)	Claudine Podvin	France	39:05.05
W45 10K
W45 10K	1st place, gold medalist(s)	Zohra Graziani	France	38:01.40
W45 10K	2nd place, silver medalist(s)	Mareike Ressing	Germany	38:08.53
W45 10K	3rd place, bronze medalist(s)	Hong Li	China	38:54.85
W50 10K
W50 10K	1st place, gold medalist(s)	Angela Carpini	Australia	38:44.34
W50 10K	2nd place, silver medalist(s)	Marianne Kaempf	Switzerland	39:26.77
W50 10K	3rd place, bronze medalist(s)	Rosario Gangloff	France	39:45.62
W55 10K
W55 10K	1st place, gold medalist(s)	Silke Schmidt	Germany	37:06.36
W55 10K	2nd place, silver medalist(s)	Claire Donald	Great Britain	38:36.64
W55 10K	3rd place, bronze medalist(s)	Inka Mims	United States	41:31.83
W60 10K
W60 10K	1st place, gold medalist(s)	Carmel Parnell Carmel	Ireland	40:29.86
W60 10K	2nd place, silver medalist(s)	Dominique Combes	France	42:16.59
W60 10K	3rd place, bronze medalist(s)	Alison Bourgeois	Great Britain	42:46.77
W65 10K
W65 10K	1st place, gold medalist(s)	Angela Copson	Great Britain	42:58.54
W65 10K	2nd place, silver medalist(s)	Gudrun Vogl	Germany	46:01.76
W65 10K	3rd place, bronze medalist(s)	Nina Becanne	France	46:47.95
W70 10K
W70 10K	1st place, gold medalist(s)	Lavinia Petrie	Australia	45:02.26
W70 10K	2nd place, silver medalist(s)	Sieglinde Schmieder	Austria	49:35.96
W70 10K	3rd place, bronze medalist(s)	Marisa Cruz	Brazil	52:02.65
W75 10K
W75 10K	1st place, gold medalist(s)	Joaquina Flores	Portugal	54:32.96
W75 10K	2nd place, silver medalist(s)	Monique Castagnet	France	56:28.90
W75 10K	3rd place, bronze medalist(s)	Viveka Rüffel	Sweden	59:20.92
W80 10K
W80 10K	1st place, gold medalist(s)	Lynne Hurrell	United States	1:01:22.26
W80 10K	2nd place, silver medalist(s)	Margarida Stella Hochstatter	Brazil	1:04:39.93
M35 10K
M35 10K	1st place, gold medalist(s)	Alexander Diaz Rodriguez	Belgium	31:08.72
M35 10K	2nd place, silver medalist(s)	Javier Martinez	Spain	31:09.66
M35 10K	3rd place, bronze medalist(s)	Andreas Lundqvist	Sweden	31:44.62
M40 10K
M40 10K	1st place, gold medalist(s)	Kojo Kyereme	Great Britain	30:52.09
M40 10K	2nd place, silver medalist(s)	Fidel Ruiz	Spain	31:51.08
M40 10K	3rd place, bronze medalist(s)	Francesco Duca	Italy	32:06.62
M45 10K
M45 10K	1st place, gold medalist(s)	César Javier Troncoso Troncoso	Argentina	32:23.40
M45 10K	2nd place, silver medalist(s)	Patrick Kwist	Netherlands	32:24.15
M45 10K	3rd place, bronze medalist(s)	Manuel Ferreira	Portugal	32:42.36
M50 10K
M50 10K	1st place, gold medalist(s)	Francisco Javier Fontaneda	Spain	32:52.03
M50 10K	2nd place, silver medalist(s)	Dov Kremer	Israel	33:06.49
M50 10K	3rd place, bronze medalist(s)	Michael Traynor	Ireland	33:23.95
M55 10K
M55 10K	1st place, gold medalist(s)	Sergey Polikarpov	Kazakhstan	33:24.36
M55 10K	2nd place, silver medalist(s)	Gilles Herman	France	34:28.73
M55 10K	3rd place, bronze medalist(s)	Ihar Dolbik	Belarus	34:40.25
M60 10K
M60 10K	1st place, gold medalist(s)	Marc Schmitt	France	35:22.93
M60 10K	2nd place, silver medalist(s)	Sergio Fernandez	Spain	35:34.13
M60 10K	3rd place, bronze medalist(s)	Jose Del Carmen Ramirez Riaño	Colombia	36:27.90
M65 10K
M65 10K	1st place, gold medalist(s)	Cees Stolwijk	Netherlands	37:02.87
M65 10K	2nd place, silver medalist(s)	Mario Vargas	Chile	37:26.08
M65 10K	3rd place, bronze medalist(s)	Gregori Fuks	Israel	38:55.62
M70 10K
M70 10K	1st place, gold medalist(s)	Albert Anderegg	Switzerland	40:22.60
M70 10K	2nd place, silver medalist(s)	Dirk Beeuwsaert	Belgium	40:27.68
M70 10K	3rd place, bronze medalist(s)	Liam Hanna	Australia	41:32.10
M75 10K
M75 10K	1st place, gold medalist(s)	Hernan Barreneche Ríos	Colombia	43:10.98
M75 10K	2nd place, silver medalist(s)	Fidel Diaz	Mexico	43:12.82
M75 10K	3rd place, bronze medalist(s)	Tarverdi Aliev	Russia	46:42.12
M80 10K
M80 10K	1st place, gold medalist(s)	Roger Davies	Canada	55:36.19
M80 10K	2nd place, silver medalist(s)	Sadao Tabira	Japan	56:37.93
M80 10K	3rd place, bronze medalist(s)	Livio Guzman Abarca	Peru	57:08.54
M85 10K
M85 10K	1st place, gold medalist(s)	Christian Larcher	France	1:03:06.91
M85 10K	2nd place, silver medalist(s)	Irwin Barrett-Lennard	Australia	1:10:29.12
M85 10K	3rd place, bronze medalist(s)	Pengxue Su	China	1:22:52.25
M90 10K
M90 10K	1st place, gold medalist(s)	Semion Simkin	Israel	1:20:01.64
M90 10K	2nd place, silver medalist(s)	Lorenzo Juvenal Perez	Argentina	1:41:28.37

=== 80 Meters Hurdles ===
Event	Pos	Athlete	Country	Result
W40 80 Meters Hurdles; Wind: +0.0
W40 80 Meters Hurdles; Wind: +0.0	1st place, gold medalist(s)	Rachel Guest	United States	11.67
W40 80 Meters Hurdles; Wind: +0.0	2nd place, silver medalist(s)	Susana Estriga	Portugal	11.70
W40 80 Meters Hurdles; Wind: +0.0	3rd place, bronze medalist(s)	Evelin Nagel	Germany	12.15
W45 80 Meters Hurdles; Wind: +1.2; Video on YouTube
W45 80 Meters Hurdles; Wind: +1.2; Video on YouTube	1st place, gold medalist(s)	Maria Costanza Moroni	Italy	12.01
W45 80 Meters Hurdles; Wind: +1.2; Video on YouTube	2nd place, silver medalist(s)	Ilse Peetermans	Belgium	12.25
W45 80 Meters Hurdles; Wind: +1.2; Video on YouTube	3rd place, bronze medalist(s)	Angeles Guerra	Spain	12.31
W50 80 Meters Hurdles; Wind: +1.7; Video on YouTube
W50 80 Meters Hurdles; Wind: +1.7; Video on YouTube	1st place, gold medalist(s)	Monica Pellegrinelli	Switzerland	12.31
W50 80 Meters Hurdles; Wind: +1.7; Video on YouTube	2nd place, silver medalist(s)	Joy Upshaw	United States	12.83
W50 80 Meters Hurdles; Wind: +1.7; Video on YouTube	3rd place, bronze medalist(s)	Sally Stagles	Australia	13.02
W55 80 Meters Hurdles; Wind: +1.2; Video on YouTube
W55 80 Meters Hurdles; Wind: +1.2; Video on YouTube	1st place, gold medalist(s)	Marie Kay	Australia	13.03
W55 80 Meters Hurdles; Wind: +1.2; Video on YouTube	2nd place, silver medalist(s)	Jane Horder	Great Britain	13.17
W55 80 Meters Hurdles; Wind: +1.2; Video on YouTube	3rd place, bronze medalist(s)	Susan Frisby	Great Britain	13.30
W60 80 Meters Hurdles; Wind: +1.5; Video on YouTube
W60 80 Meters Hurdles; Wind: +1.5; Video on YouTube	1st place, gold medalist(s)	Maria Jesus Sanguos Espiña	Spain	13.42
W60 80 Meters Hurdles; Wind: +1.5; Video on YouTube	2nd place, silver medalist(s)	Rita Hanscom	United States	13.66
W60 80 Meters Hurdles; Wind: +1.5; Video on YouTube	3rd place, bronze medalist(s)	Hildegarde Vanhorenbeeck	Belgium	14.32
W65 80 Meters Hurdles; Wind: +1.2
W65 80 Meters Hurdles; Wind: +1.2	1st place, gold medalist(s)	Emily Mcmahon	Great Britain	15.46
W65 80 Meters Hurdles; Wind: +1.2	2nd place, silver medalist(s)	Wilma Perkins	Australia	15.82
W65 80 Meters Hurdles; Wind: +1.2	3rd place, bronze medalist(s)	Terhi Kokkonen	Finland	16.01
W70 80 Meters Hurdles; Wind: +0.7
W70 80 Meters Hurdles; Wind: +0.7	1st place, gold medalist(s)	Sirkka-Liisa Ruuskanen	Finland	18.44
W70 80 Meters Hurdles; Wind: +0.7	2nd place, silver medalist(s)	Jacqueline Wladika	Austria	19.18
W70 80 Meters Hurdles; Wind: +0.7	3rd place, bronze medalist(s)	Kerstin Nilsson	Sweden	19.70
W75 80 Meters Hurdles; Wind: +0.8
W75 80 Meters Hurdles; Wind: +0.8	1st place, gold medalist(s)	Christa Bortignon	Canada	24.08
W80 80 Meters Hurdles; Wind: +0.8; Video on YouTube
W80 80 Meters Hurdles; Wind: +0.8; Video on YouTube	1st place, gold medalist(s)	Irene Obera	United States	19.32 WR
W80 80 Meters Hurdles; Wind: +0.8; Video on YouTube	2nd place, silver medalist(s)	Florence Meiler	United States	20.23
M70 80 Meters Hurdles; Wind: +1.1
M70 80 Meters Hurdles; Wind: +1.1	1st place, gold medalist(s)	Rolf Geese	Germany	13.40
M70 80 Meters Hurdles; Wind: +1.1	2nd place, silver medalist(s)	Milan Beliansky	Slovakia	13.66
M70 80 Meters Hurdles; Wind: +1.1	3rd place, bronze medalist(s)	Dietmar Steiner	Austria	14.23
M75 80 Meters Hurdles; Wind: +1.2
M75 80 Meters Hurdles; Wind: +1.2	1st place, gold medalist(s)	Guido Müller	Germany	14.20
M75 80 Meters Hurdles; Wind: +1.2	2nd place, silver medalist(s)	Valery Ukhov	Russia	14.62
M75 80 Meters Hurdles; Wind: +1.2	3rd place, bronze medalist(s)	Michael Stevenson	Australia	14.98
M80 80 Meters Hurdles; Wind: +1.5
M80 80 Meters Hurdles; Wind: +1.5	1st place, gold medalist(s)	Rolf Bertram	Germany	16.67
M80 80 Meters Hurdles; Wind: +1.5	2nd place, silver medalist(s)	Symeon Symeonidis	Greece	18.07
M80 80 Meters Hurdles; Wind: +1.5	3rd place, bronze medalist(s)	Nobuo Ishikawa	Japan	18.15
M85 80 Meters Hurdles; Wind: +0.5
M85 80 Meters Hurdles; Wind: +0.5	1st place, gold medalist(s)	Skaria John Poovathinkalmattakal	India	21.78
M85 80 Meters Hurdles; Wind: +0.5	2nd place, silver medalist(s)	Munehiro Toriya	Japan	27.98

=== 100 Meters Hurdles ===
Event	Pos	Athlete	Country	Result
W35 100 Meters Hurdles; Wind: +0.8
W35 100 Meters Hurdles; Wind: +0.8	1st place, gold medalist(s)	Jennifer Schmelter	Germany	14.69
W35 100 Meters Hurdles; Wind: +0.8	2nd place, silver medalist(s)	Laurence Guillet	Belgium	14.94
W35 100 Meters Hurdles; Wind: +0.8	3rd place, bronze medalist(s)	Dragana Ciganovic	Croatia	16.52
M50 100 Meters Hurdles; Wind: +1.8
M50 100 Meters Hurdles; Wind: +1.8	1st place, gold medalist(s)	Thomas Oberhofer	Italy	14.15
M50 100 Meters Hurdles; Wind: +1.8	2nd place, silver medalist(s)	David Ashford	United States	14.31
M50 100 Meters Hurdles; Wind: +1.8	3rd place, bronze medalist(s)	Jean Luc Duez	France	14.33
M55 100 Meters Hurdles; Wind: +0.6
M55 100 Meters Hurdles; Wind: +0.6	1st place, gold medalist(s)	Timo Rajamaki	Finland	15.11
M55 100 Meters Hurdles; Wind: +0.6	2nd place, silver medalist(s)	John Mayor	Great Britain	15.21
M55 100 Meters Hurdles; Wind: +0.6	3rd place, bronze medalist(s)	Hervé Mondesir	France	15.28
M60 100 Meters Hurdles; Wind: +0.1
M60 100 Meters Hurdles; Wind: +0.1	1st place, gold medalist(s)	Herbert Kreiner	Austria	14.97
M60 100 Meters Hurdles; Wind: +0.1	2nd place, silver medalist(s)	Ward Hazen	Canada	15.35
M60 100 Meters Hurdles; Wind: +0.1	3rd place, bronze medalist(s)	Yau-Ming Max Siu	Hong Kong	16.27
M65 100 Meters Hurdles; Wind: +1.0
M65 100 Meters Hurdles; Wind: +1.0	1st place, gold medalist(s)	Valeriy Davydov	Russia	15.68
M65 100 Meters Hurdles; Wind: +1.0	2nd place, silver medalist(s)	Tony Wells	Great Britain	16.66
M65 100 Meters Hurdles; Wind: +1.0	3rd place, bronze medalist(s)	Ryszard Lech	Canada	17.16

=== 110 Meters Hurdles ===
Event	Pos	Athlete	Country	Result
M35 110 Meters Hurdles; Wind: +1.5
M35 110 Meters Hurdles; Wind: +1.5	1st place, gold medalist(s)	Hiroyuki Fukuda	Japan	14.05
M35 110 Meters Hurdles; Wind: +1.5	2nd place, silver medalist(s)	Christophe Emica	France	14.22
M35 110 Meters Hurdles; Wind: +1.5	3rd place, bronze medalist(s)	Liam Collins	Great Britain	14.24
M40 110 Meters Hurdles; Wind: +1.9
M40 110 Meters Hurdles; Wind: +1.9	1st place, gold medalist(s)	Yasunori Yoshioka	Japan	14.22
M40 110 Meters Hurdles; Wind: +1.9	2nd place, silver medalist(s)	Shaun Bownes	South Africa	14.53
M40 110 Meters Hurdles; Wind: +1.9	3rd place, bronze medalist(s)	Joe Appiah	Great Britain	15.06
M45 110 Meters Hurdles; Wind: +0.4
M45 110 Meters Hurdles; Wind: +0.4	1st place, gold medalist(s)	Don Drummond	United States	15.27
M45 110 Meters Hurdles; Wind: +0.4	2nd place, silver medalist(s)	Patrice Legrand	France	15.50
M45 110 Meters Hurdles; Wind: +0.4	3rd place, bronze medalist(s)	Volodymyr Dobrydniev	Ukraine	15.80

=== 200 Meters Hurdles ===
Event	Pos	Athlete	Country	Result
W70 200 Meters Hurdles; Wind: +0.7
W70 200 Meters Hurdles; Wind: +0.7	1st place, gold medalist(s)	Marge Allison	Australia	36.71 WR
W70 200 Meters Hurdles; Wind: +0.7	2nd place, silver medalist(s)	Riet Jonkers-Slegers	Netherlands	39.45
W70 200 Meters Hurdles; Wind: +0.7	3rd place, bronze medalist(s)	Sirkka-Liisa Ruuskanen	Finland	41.89
W75 200 Meters Hurdles; Wind: +0.4
W75 200 Meters Hurdles; Wind: +0.4	1st place, gold medalist(s)	Christa Bortignon	Canada	44.03
W80 200 Meters Hurdles; Wind: +0.4
W80 200 Meters Hurdles; Wind: +0.4	1st place, gold medalist(s)	Irene Obera	United States	49.19
W80 200 Meters Hurdles; Wind: +0.4	2nd place, silver medalist(s)	Florence Meiler	United States	53.75
M80 200 Meters Hurdles; Wind: +1.1
M80 200 Meters Hurdles; Wind: +1.1	1st place, gold medalist(s)	Rolf Bertram	Germany	39.67
M80 200 Meters Hurdles; Wind: +1.1	2nd place, silver medalist(s)	Nobuo Ishikawa	Japan	40.14
M80 200 Meters Hurdles; Wind: +1.1	3rd place, bronze medalist(s)	Raúl López Barrera	Uruguay	42.26
M85 200 Meters Hurdles; Wind: -0.1
M85 200 Meters Hurdles; Wind: -0.1	1st place, gold medalist(s)	Skaria John Poovathinkalmattakal	India	50.68
M85 200 Meters Hurdles; Wind: -0.1	2nd place, silver medalist(s)	Munehiro Toriya	Japan	1:07.80

=== 300 Meters Hurdles ===
Event	Pos	Athlete	Country	Result
W50 300 Meters Hurdles; Video on YouTube
W50 300 Meters Hurdles; Video on YouTube	1st place, gold medalist(s)	Barbara Gähling	Germany	44.90 WR
W50 300 Meters Hurdles; Video on YouTube	2nd place, silver medalist(s)	Joy Upshaw	United States	49.03
W50 300 Meters Hurdles; Video on YouTube	3rd place, bronze medalist(s)	Michele Hossack	Australia	50.68
W55 300 Meters Hurdles; Video on YouTube
W55 300 Meters Hurdles; Video on YouTube	1st place, gold medalist(s)	Jane Horder	Great Britain	51.14
W55 300 Meters Hurdles; Video on YouTube	2nd place, silver medalist(s)	Susan Frisby	Great Britain	51.69
W55 300 Meters Hurdles; Video on YouTube	3rd place, bronze medalist(s)	Robyn Suttor	Australia	52.99
W60 300 Meters Hurdles; Video on YouTube
W60 300 Meters Hurdles; Video on YouTube	1st place, gold medalist(s)	Maria Jesus Sanguos Espiña	Spain	51.86
W60 300 Meters Hurdles; Video on YouTube	2nd place, silver medalist(s)	Rita Hanscom	United States	56.35
W60 300 Meters Hurdles; Video on YouTube	3rd place, bronze medalist(s)	Hildegarde Vanhorenbeeck	Belgium	57.39
W65 300 Meters Hurdles; Video on YouTube
W65 300 Meters Hurdles; Video on YouTube	1st place, gold medalist(s)	Emily Mcmahon	Great Britain	1:00.08
W65 300 Meters Hurdles; Video on YouTube	2nd place, silver medalist(s)	Terhi Kokkonen	Finland	1:01.01
W65 300 Meters Hurdles; Video on YouTube	3rd place, bronze medalist(s)	Amanda Arrechea	Colombia	1:02.79
M60 300 Meters Hurdles
M60 300 Meters Hurdles	1st place, gold medalist(s)	George Haywood	United States	45.31
M60 300 Meters Hurdles	2nd place, silver medalist(s)	Ian Broadhurst	Great Britain	45.40
M60 300 Meters Hurdles	3rd place, bronze medalist(s)	Thaddeus Wilson	United States	45.91
M65 300 Meters Hurdles
M65 300 Meters Hurdles	1st place, gold medalist(s)	Rodney Wiltshire	United States	48.00
M65 300 Meters Hurdles	2nd place, silver medalist(s)	Valeriy Davydov	Russia	48.09
M65 300 Meters Hurdles	3rd place, bronze medalist(s)	John Lamb	Australia	48.40
M70 300 Meters Hurdles
M70 300 Meters Hurdles	1st place, gold medalist(s)	Hans-Jürgen Frühauf	Germany	47.38
M70 300 Meters Hurdles	2nd place, silver medalist(s)	Dietmar Steiner	Austria	50.76
M70 300 Meters Hurdles	3rd place, bronze medalist(s)	John Yuan Chung Hsu	Chinese Taipei	50.76
M75 300 Meters Hurdles
M75 300 Meters Hurdles	1st place, gold medalist(s)	Guido Müller	Germany	50.02
M75 300 Meters Hurdles	2nd place, silver medalist(s)	Dr. Hartmann Knorr	Germany	55.08
M75 300 Meters Hurdles	3rd place, bronze medalist(s)	Michael Stevenson	Australia	55.47

=== 400 Meters Hurdles ===
Event	Pos	Athlete	Country	Result
W35 400 Meters Hurdles
W35 400 Meters Hurdles	1st place, gold medalist(s)	Emmanuelle Roggemans	France	1:03.46
W35 400 Meters Hurdles	2nd place, silver medalist(s)	Leanne Buxton	Great Britain	1:04.24
W35 400 Meters Hurdles	3rd place, bronze medalist(s)	Paula Owen	Great Britain	1:05.22
W40 400 Meters Hurdles
W40 400 Meters Hurdles	1st place, gold medalist(s)	Emanuela Baggiolini	Italy	1:01.30
W40 400 Meters Hurdles	2nd place, silver medalist(s)	Susana Estriga	Portugal	1:02.95
W40 400 Meters Hurdles	3rd place, bronze medalist(s)	Carine Legendre	France	1:03.82
W45 400 Meters Hurdles; Video on YouTube
W45 400 Meters Hurdles; Video on YouTube	1st place, gold medalist(s)	Viviane Tual-Dorsile	France	1:07.02
W45 400 Meters Hurdles; Video on YouTube	2nd place, silver medalist(s)	Lenore Lambert	Australia	1:08.20
W45 400 Meters Hurdles; Video on YouTube	3rd place, bronze medalist(s)	Elena Sheludina	Russia	1:08.38
M35 400 Meters Hurdles
M35 400 Meters Hurdles	1st place, gold medalist(s)	Jakub Adamczyk	Poland	52.86
M35 400 Meters Hurdles	2nd place, silver medalist(s)	Liam Collins	Great Britain	53.65
M35 400 Meters Hurdles	3rd place, bronze medalist(s)	Christophe Rouyer	France	55.30
M40 400 Meters Hurdles; Video on YouTube
M40 400 Meters Hurdles; Video on YouTube	1st place, gold medalist(s)	Bruno Wavelet	France	55.12
M40 400 Meters Hurdles; Video on YouTube	2nd place, silver medalist(s)	Edward Betts	Great Britain	55.34
M40 400 Meters Hurdles; Video on YouTube	3rd place, bronze medalist(s)	Gerald Piot	France	56.48
M45 400 Meters Hurdles; Video on YouTube
M45 400 Meters Hurdles; Video on YouTube	1st place, gold medalist(s)	Winston Chambers	Jamaica	56.86
M45 400 Meters Hurdles; Video on YouTube	2nd place, silver medalist(s)	Antoine Abatucci	France	58.39
M45 400 Meters Hurdles; Video on YouTube	3rd place, bronze medalist(s)	Brad Dittmar	United States	58.41
M50 400 Meters Hurdles
M50 400 Meters Hurdles	1st place, gold medalist(s)	Getulio Echeandia	Puerto Rico	57.53
M50 400 Meters Hurdles	2nd place, silver medalist(s)	Jonathan Tilt	Great Britain	58.90
M50 400 Meters Hurdles	3rd place, bronze medalist(s)	Bart van Rookhuizen	Netherlands	59.48
M55 400 Meters Hurdles
M55 400 Meters Hurdles	1st place, gold medalist(s)	Richard White	Great Britain	1:02.32
M55 400 Meters Hurdles	2nd place, silver medalist(s)	Reggie Garner	United States	1:02.53
M55 400 Meters Hurdles	3rd place, bronze medalist(s)	Albert Soba	Slovenia	1:02.61

=== 2000 Meters Steeplechase ===
Event	Pos	Athlete	Country	Result
W35 2K Steeplechase
W35 2K Steeplechase	1st place, gold medalist(s)	Joanne Locker	Great Britain	7:13.31
W35 2K Steeplechase	2nd place, silver medalist(s)	Katrin Ochs	Germany	7:21.97
W35 2K Steeplechase	3rd place, bronze medalist(s)	Nina Wimmer	Germany	7:24.01
W40 2K Steeplechase
W40 2K Steeplechase	1st place, gold medalist(s)	Vanda Ribeiro	Portugal	7:26.65
W40 2K Steeplechase	2nd place, silver medalist(s)	Alonso Pilar Alonso	Spain	7:44.77
W40 2K Steeplechase	3rd place, bronze medalist(s)	Angela Martinez	Spain	7:51.90
W45 2K Steeplechase
W45 2K Steeplechase	1st place, gold medalist(s)	Jimenez Guardeño	Spain	7:43.61
W45 2K Steeplechase	2nd place, silver medalist(s)	Paola Olivari	Chile	7:57.13
W45 2K Steeplechase	3rd place, bronze medalist(s)	Krasimira Chahova	Bulgaria	8:15.77
W50 2K Steeplechase
W50 2K Steeplechase	1st place, gold medalist(s)	Zof Wieciorkowska	Poland	7:47.79
W50 2K Steeplechase	2nd place, silver medalist(s)	Makiko Sueyoshi	Japan	8:06.58
W50 2K Steeplechase	3rd place, bronze medalist(s)	Jane Pidgeon	Great Britain	8:08.68
W55 2K Steeplechase; Video on YouTube
W55 2K Steeplechase; Video on YouTube	1st place, gold medalist(s)	Cheryl Bellaire	United States	8:50.90
W55 2K Steeplechase; Video on YouTube	2nd place, silver medalist(s)	Elisabeth Henn	Germany	8:54.13
W55 2K Steeplechase; Video on YouTube	3rd place, bronze medalist(s)	Gunnel Tolfes	Sweden	9:12.43
W60 2K Steeplechase; Video on YouTube
W60 2K Steeplechase; Video on YouTube	1st place, gold medalist(s)	Margaret Saunders	Australia	9:14.23
W60 2K Steeplechase; Video on YouTube	2nd place, silver medalist(s)	Eliisa Reijonen	Finland	9:32.17
W60 2K Steeplechase; Video on YouTube	3rd place, bronze medalist(s)	Roswita Schlachte	Germany	10:02.69
W65 2K Steeplechase
W65 2K Steeplechase	1st place, gold medalist(s)	Irene Davey	Australia	10:54.83
W65 2K Steeplechase	2nd place, silver medalist(s)	Heather Carr	Australia	11:00.39
W65 2K Steeplechase	3rd place, bronze medalist(s)	Mei-Yun Yu	Chinese Taipei	11:23.55
W70 2K Steeplechase
W70 2K Steeplechase	1st place, gold medalist(s)	Anne Lang	Australia	11:28.67
W70 2K Steeplechase	2nd place, silver medalist(s)	Marina Terceros	Bolivia	12:06.78
W70 2K Steeplechase	3rd place, bronze medalist(s)	Milosla Rocnakova	Czech Republic	12:45.77
W75 2K Steeplechase
W75 2K Steeplechase	1st place, gold medalist(s)	Ikuko Suzuki	Japan	12:53.55
W75 2K Steeplechase	2nd place, silver medalist(s)	Garcia Moreno	Mexico	14:38.29
W80 2K Steeplechase
W80 2K Steeplechase	1st place, gold medalist(s)	Florence Meiler	United States	15:43.23 WR
M60 2K Steeplechase
M60 2K Steeplechase	1st place, gold medalist(s)	Aragon Muñoz	Spain	7:06.36
M60 2K Steeplechase	2nd place, silver medalist(s)	Valde Piiroinen	Finland	7:09.55
M60 2K Steeplechase	3rd place, bronze medalist(s)	Dale Campbell	United States	7:15.39
M65 2K Steeplechase
M65 2K Steeplechase	1st place, gold medalist(s)	Johny Boexstaens	Belgium	7:42.01
M65 2K Steeplechase	2nd place, silver medalist(s)	Martin McEvilly	Ireland	7:42.87
M65 2K Steeplechase	3rd place, bronze medalist(s)	Allan Mayfield	Australia	7:45.81
M70 2K Steeplechase
M70 2K Steeplechase	1st place, gold medalist(s)	Emil de la Camara	Spain	8:45.05
M70 2K Steeplechase	2nd place, silver medalist(s)	John Horton	Great Britain	9:06.73
M70 2K Steeplechase	3rd place, bronze medalist(s)	Bruce Wilson	Australia	9:19.70
M75 2K Steeplechase
M75 2K Steeplechase	1st place, gold medalist(s)	Jean-Louis Esnault	France	8:49.01
M75 2K Steeplechase	2nd place, silver medalist(s)	Hipolito Palma	Chile	9:13.60
M75 2K Steeplechase	3rd place, bronze medalist(s)	Augusto Roldan	Colombia	9:53.27
M80 2K Steeplechase
M80 2K Steeplechase	1st place, gold medalist(s)	David Carr	Australia	10:42.26
M80 2K Steeplechase	2nd place, silver medalist(s)	Ryosuke Takahara	Japan	10:44.54
M80 2K Steeplechase	3rd place, bronze medalist(s)	Horacio Cabito	Argentina	13:19.39
M85 2K Steeplechase
M85 2K Steeplechase	1st place, gold medalist(s)	Barrett-Lennard	Australia	12:50.99
M85 2K Steeplechase	2nd place, silver medalist(s)	Luis Torres Rosa	Puerto Rico	16:29.33

=== 3000 Meters Steeplechase ===
Event	Pos	Athlete	Country	Result
M35 3K Steeplechase
M35 3K Steeplechase	1st place, gold medalist(s)	Francisco Javier Lara	Spain	9:17.27
M35 3K Steeplechase	2nd place, silver medalist(s)	Andreas Lundqvist	Sweden	9:22.11
M35 3K Steeplechase	3rd place, bronze medalist(s)	Mickael Moissonnier	France	9:23.79
M40 3K Steeplechase
M40 3K Steeplechase	1st place, gold medalist(s)	Jose Luis Blanco Quevedo	Spain	9:15.24
M40 3K Steeplechase	2nd place, silver medalist(s)	Ciaran Doherty	Ireland	9:23.77
M40 3K Steeplechase	3rd place, bronze medalist(s)	Manuel Nuñez	Spain	9:36.72
M45 3K Steeplechase
M45 3K Steeplechase	1st place, gold medalist(s)	Pascal Ruiz	France	9:56.36
M45 3K Steeplechase	2nd place, silver medalist(s)	Christophe Le Bihan	France	10:01.93
M45 3K Steeplechase	3rd place, bronze medalist(s)	Miguel Angel Fernandez Cobo	Spain	10:09.66
M50 3K Steeplechase
M50 3K Steeplechase	1st place, gold medalist(s)	Gilles Pelletier	France	10:01.73
M50 3K Steeplechase	2nd place, silver medalist(s)	Georges Ribeiro	France	10:29.50
M50 3K Steeplechase	3rd place, bronze medalist(s)	Shawn Muldrew	Canada	10:38.51
M55 3K Steeplechase
M55 3K Steeplechase	1st place, gold medalist(s)	Cesar Perez	Spain	10:38.09
M55 3K Steeplechase	2nd place, silver medalist(s)	Stanislaw Lancucki	Poland	11:00.75
M55 3K Steeplechase	3rd place, bronze medalist(s)	Chris Deighan	Canada	11:04.34

=== 4 x 100 Meters Relay ===
Event	Pos	Athlete	Country	Result
W35 4 x 100 Meters Relay
W35 4 x 100 Meters Relay	1st place, gold medalist(s)	Trinidad and Tobago	Doneller Stafford, Sasha Springer, Ayanna Hutchinson, Marsha Mark-Baird	47.65 WR
W35 4 x 100 Meters Relay	2nd place, silver medalist(s)	France	Emily Jouberton, Agnès Hernu, Carine Dragin, Ingrid Selin	49.09
W35 4 x 100 Meters Relay	3rd place, bronze medalist(s)	Great Britain	Helen Channon, Susan Young, Paula Owen, Susie McLoughlin	49.30
W40 4 x 100 Meters Relay
W40 4 x 100 Meters Relay	1st place, gold medalist(s)	Spain	Yolanda Badía Gimeno, Emilia Paunica, Ana Maria Álvarez Grijalba, Assum Puig Planella	51.21
W40 4 x 100 Meters Relay	2nd place, silver medalist(s)	France	Marie Salignat Plumasseau, Nathalie Hospitalier, Virginie Bonnnet, Nadine Landa	52.00
W40 4 x 100 Meters Relay	3rd place, bronze medalist(s)	Germany	Bettina Belau, Christina Bösch, Michaela Zwiener, Kerstin Drewes-Czech	52.10
W45 4 x 100 Meters Relay
W45 4 x 100 Meters Relay	1st place, gold medalist(s)	United States	Emmanuelle McGowan, Beth Clark, Evelyn Konrad, Joy Upshaw	50.87
W45 4 x 100 Meters Relay	2nd place, silver medalist(s)	Italy	Marta Roccamo, Maria Costanza Moroni, Gigliola Giorgi, Maria Ruggeri	50.92
W45 4 x 100 Meters Relay	3rd place, bronze medalist(s)	Germany	Cornelia Reck, Elisabeth Frisch, Eva Guenther-Graeff, Iris Opitz	51.22
W50 4 x 100 Meters Relay
W50 4 x 100 Meters Relay	1st place, gold medalist(s)	France	Nicole Alexis, Joelle Zongo, Magali Welch, Murielle Lyonnard	53.49
W50 4 x 100 Meters Relay	2nd place, silver medalist(s)	Australia	Julie Forster, Michele Hossack, Kathryn Blute, Sally Stagles	56.82
W50 4 x 100 Meters Relay	3rd place, bronze medalist(s)	Germany	Jana Thierfelder, Angelika Grissmer, Heike Scheffler, Gabriela Kunz	56.89
W55 4 x 100 Meters Relay
W55 4 x 100 Meters Relay	1st place, gold medalist(s)	Great Britain	Jane Horder, Susan Frisby, Lesley Parsons, Averil Mcclelland	56.16
W55 4 x 100 Meters Relay	2nd place, silver medalist(s)	United States	Susan Loyd, Ginny Richburg, Vicki Fox, Daphne Sluys	57.94
W55 4 x 100 Meters Relay	3rd place, bronze medalist(s)	France	Annie Dorina, Odile Pourchon, Marie-Claire Tassin, Dominique Pozzo Charvier	58.32
W60 4 x 100 Meters Relay
W60 4 x 100 Meters Relay	1st place, gold medalist(s)	Great Britain	Joan Trimble, Edna Roe, Anne Nelson, Caroline Powell	59.52
W60 4 x 100 Meters Relay	2nd place, silver medalist(s)	Germany	Ingeborg Thoma, Anne Rummler, Christina Friedrich, Caecilia Apel-Kranz	1:03.44
W60 4 x 100 Meters Relay	3rd place, bronze medalist(s)	France	Colette Ruineau, Bernadette Rahim, Gisele Gennevieve, Michelle Peroni	1:10.96
W65 4 x 100 Meters Relay
W65 4 x 100 Meters Relay	1st place, gold medalist(s)	Germany	Petra Zörner, Rita Buchholz, Gertrude Reismann, Ingrid Meier	1:00.31 WR
W65 4 x 100 Meters Relay	2nd place, silver medalist(s)	Australia	Paula Moorhouse, Evelyn Peake, Margaret Taylor, Wilma Perkins	1:03.46
W65 4 x 100 Meters Relay	3rd place, bronze medalist(s)	Great Britain	Patricia Oakes, Angela Copson, Iris Holder, Jean Fail	1:09.46
W70 4 x 100 Meters Relay
W70 4 x 100 Meters Relay	1st place, gold medalist(s)	Australia	Noreen Parrish, Marge Allison, Miriam Cudmore, Peggy Macliver	1:10.76
W70 4 x 100 Meters Relay	2nd place, silver medalist(s)	Germany	Anne-Kathrin Eriksen, Vroni Lay, Diethild Nix, Hannelore Venn	1:11.27
W70 4 x 100 Meters Relay	3rd place, bronze medalist(s)	Sweden	Astrid Nilsson, Sonja Nilsson, Kerstin Nilsson, Kristina Carlsson	1:16.10
W80 4 x 100 Meters Relay
W80 4 x 100 Meters Relay	1st place, gold medalist(s)	United States	Christel Donley, Florence Meiler, Fei-Mei Chou, Irene Obera	1:21.06 WR
M35 4 x 100 Meters Relay
M35 4 x 100 Meters Relay	1st place, gold medalist(s)	France	Samba Niangane, David Beaumont, Imad Rahoui, Michel Viallet	42.09
M35 4 x 100 Meters Relay	2nd place, silver medalist(s)	United States	Babatunde Ridley, Dedrick Clark, Ivory Veale, Lyndell Pittman	42.68
M35 4 x 100 Meters Relay	3rd place, bronze medalist(s)	Great Britain	Stuart Channon, Mensah Elliott, Ben Owen, Richard Beardsell	43.07
M40 4 x 100 Meters Relay
M40 4 x 100 Meters Relay	1st place, gold medalist(s)	Japan	Fumiyasu Ishiguro, Takeshi Fukuzato, Junichi Watanabe, So Takei	42.70
M40 4 x 100 Meters Relay	2nd place, silver medalist(s)	France	George Egoua, Thierry Vilsans, Marc Ozier, Bouziane Belghorzi	43.26
M40 4 x 100 Meters Relay	3rd place, bronze medalist(s)	Great Britain	Mike Coogan, Jason Carty, Jim Tipper, Tamunonengiye Ofori Ossai	43.68
M45 4 x 100 Meters Relay
M45 4 x 100 Meters Relay	1st place, gold medalist(s)	Germany	Thomas Kessler, Bernd Schauwecker, Bernd Lachmann, Roland Gröger	44.59
M45 4 x 100 Meters Relay	2nd place, silver medalist(s)	United States	Clinton Aurelien, Duane Gosa, Robert Thomas, Don Drummond	45.20
M45 4 x 100 Meters Relay	3rd place, bronze medalist(s)	Great Britain	Leeroy Golding, Dominic Bokor-Ingram, Phil Rogers, Michael Gardiner	45.27
M50 4 x 100 Meters Relay; Video on YouTube
M50 4 x 100 Meters Relay; Video on YouTube	1st place, gold medalist(s)	Italy	Roberto Barontini, Gianni Becatti, Alberto Zanelli, Paolo Mazzocconi	45.69
M50 4 x 100 Meters Relay; Video on YouTube	2nd place, silver medalist(s)	United States	Leondus Worsley, Damon Blakemore, Eric Merriweather, Francois Boda	47.12
M50 4 x 100 Meters Relay; Video on YouTube	3rd place, bronze medalist(s)	Great Britain	Michael Vassiliou, John Shepherd, Glen Reddington, Donald Brown	47.59
M55 4 x 100 Meters Relay
M55 4 x 100 Meters Relay	1st place, gold medalist(s)	United States	Tony DiSalvo, Brent Cottong, James Chinn, Allan Tissenbaum	47.10
M55 4 x 100 Meters Relay	2nd place, silver medalist(s)	Germany	Peter Hoell; Gerhard Zorn, Wolfgang Richter, Heiner Lüers,	48.02
M55 4 x 100 Meters Relay	3rd place, bronze medalist(s)	France	Benoît Zavattero, Patrick Barbier, Hervé Mondesir, Mansour Choukairy	48.35
M60 4 x 100 Meters Relay
M60 4 x 100 Meters Relay	1st place, gold medalist(s)	Great Britain	Tom Phillips, Ian Broadhurst, Alasdair Ross, Steve Peters	48.45
M60 4 x 100 Meters Relay	2nd place, silver medalist(s)	Germany	Wolfgang Kreemke, Rudolf König, Reinhard Michelchen, Ernst Becker	49.21
M60 4 x 100 Meters Relay	3rd place, bronze medalist(s)	Finland	Jouko Nikula, Harri Huotari, Raimo Koskela, Ari Aartola	50.90
M65 4 x 100 Meters Relay
M65 4 x 100 Meters Relay	1st place, gold medalist(s)	Australia	William Carr, Alan Coleman, John Lamb, Peter Crombie	53.05
M65 4 x 100 Meters Relay	2nd place, silver medalist(s)	France	Daniel Débonnaire, Pierre Simon, Jean-Martin Allenbach, Pierre Teurnier	54.21
M65 4 x 100 Meters Relay	3rd place, bronze medalist(s)	Germany	Ulrich Klemm, Winfried Heckner, Günter Hartung, Heinz Wondra	56.09
M70 4 x 100 Meters Relay
M70 4 x 100 Meters Relay	1st place, gold medalist(s)	Great Britain	Victor Novell, Laurence Oldfield, Terry Bissett, Glyn Sutton	53.10
M70 4 x 100 Meters Relay	2nd place, silver medalist(s)	Finland	Aimo Mikkola, Antero Markunsalo, Markku Juopperi, Jouko lä-Liedenpohja	56.47
M70 4 x 100 Meters Relay	3rd place, bronze medalist(s)	France	Jean-Claude Pasquini, Jean Deblieux, Pierre Aliphat, Eugene Mocka	58.65
M75 4 x 100 Meters Relay
M75 4 x 100 Meters Relay	1st place, gold medalist(s)	Germany	Dr. Hartmann Knorr, Gerhard Adams, Dr. Karl Schmid, Guido Müller	58.48
M75 4 x 100 Meters Relay	2nd place, silver medalist(s)	United States	Emil Pawlik, Robert Cozens, Robert Lida, Bill Kaspari	1:01.12
M75 4 x 100 Meters Relay	3rd place, bronze medalist(s)	Russia	Valery Ukhov, Vladimir Lushchikov, Anatolyi Romanov, Anatoly Zorin	1:01.46
M80 4 x 100 Meters Relay
M80 4 x 100 Meters Relay	1st place, gold medalist(s)	Japan	Hiroo Tanaka, Ryosuke Takahara, Sadao Tabira, Nobuo Ishikawa	1:09.85

=== 4 x 400 Meters Relay ===
Event	Pos	Athlete	Country	Result
W35 4 x 400 Meters Relay
W35 4 x 400 Meters Relay	1st place, gold medalist(s)	France	Marie-Hélèn Essengue-Dooh, Peggy Paulmin, Ingrid Selin, Safia Elmi-Gani	4:05.53
W35 4 x 400 Meters Relay	2nd place, silver medalist(s)	United States	Maurelhena Walles, Rachel Guest, Danelle Readinger, Rukiya Jeffers	4:06.97
W35 4 x 400 Meters Relay	3rd place, bronze medalist(s)	Spain	Ester Benavene Chimeno, Corinne Damas Sandiford, Ángeles Rodríguez, Elisabet Ruz	4:11.56
W40 4 x 400 Meters Relay
W40 4 x 400 Meters Relay	1st place, gold medalist(s)	Italy	Cristina Sanulli, Emanuela Baggiolini, Maria Ruggeri, Maria Costanza Moroni	3:57.23
W40 4 x 400 Meters Relay	2nd place, silver medalist(s)	Germany	Eva Guenther-Graeff, Michaela Zwiener, Ines Trampel, Kerstin Drewes-Czech	4:11.54
W40 4 x 400 Meters Relay	3rd place, bronze medalist(s)	Spain	Yolanda Badía Gimeno, Encarna Gutiérrez Ocaña, Emilia Paunica, Assum Puig Planella	4:13.01
W45 4 x 400 Meters Relay
W45 4 x 400 Meters Relay	1st place, gold medalist(s)	Australia	Narelle Lehmann, Jacqualine Bezuidenhout, Lenore Lambert, Janelle Delaney	4:04.93
W45 4 x 400 Meters Relay	2nd place, silver medalist(s)	United States	Emmanuelle McGowan, Lisa Daley, Evelyn Konrad, Christine Gentile	4:10.95
W45 4 x 400 Meters Relay	3rd place, bronze medalist(s)	Spain	Maria José Carabante, Esther Colas, Angeles Guerra, Mª Dolor Jimenez Guardeño	4:16.66
W50 4 x 400 Meters Relay
W50 4 x 400 Meters Relay	1st place, gold medalist(s)	France	Nicole Alexis, Joelle Zongo, Magali Welch, Murielle Lyonnard	4:34.78
W50 4 x 400 Meters Relay	2nd place, silver medalist(s)	Australia	Michele Hossack, Gail Stone, Marie Kay, Robyn Suttor	4:51.28
W50 4 x 400 Meters Relay	3rd place, bronze medalist(s)	United States	Cheryl Bellaire, Joy Upshaw, Karen Frazier, Ginny Richburg	4:56.25
W55 4 x 400 Meters Relay
W55 4 x 400 Meters Relay	1st place, gold medalist(s)	United States	Vicki Fox, Susan Loyd, Alina Macneal, Daphne Sluys	4:40.90
W55 4 x 400 Meters Relay	2nd place, silver medalist(s)	France	Edith Caux, Christine ezet Gonnet, Patricia Gould-Dupuit, Dominique Pozzo Charvier	4:41.19
W55 4 x 400 Meters Relay	3rd place, bronze medalist(s)	Great Britain	Averil Mcclelland, Lesley Parsons, Susan Frisby, Jane Horder	4:41.55
W60 4 x 400 Meters Relay
W60 4 x 400 Meters Relay	1st place, gold medalist(s)	Great Britain	Helen Godsell, Joan Trimble, Edna Roe, Caroline Powell	4:49.58 WR
W60 4 x 400 Meters Relay	2nd place, silver medalist(s)	Australia	Lynne Choate, Margaret Saunders, Anne Ryan, Jeanette Flynn	5:06.68
W60 4 x 400 Meters Relay	3rd place, bronze medalist(s)	Finland	Terhi Kokkonen, Eliisa Reijonen, Marja Metsänkylä, Maija Kumpula	5:28.42
W65 4 x 400 Meters Relay
W65 4 x 400 Meters Relay	1st place, gold medalist(s)	Germany	Petra Zörner, Rita Buchholz, Ute Kappei, Ingrid Meier	5:52.30
W65 4 x 400 Meters Relay	2nd place, silver medalist(s)	Australia	Paula Moorhouse, Noreen Parrish, Wilma Perkins, Evelyn Peake	5:56.70
W65 4 x 400 Meters Relay	3rd place, bronze medalist(s)	Great Britain	Angela Copson, Anne Martin, Betty Stracey, Rosalind Tabor	6:15.66
W70 4 x 400 Meters Relay
W70 4 x 400 Meters Relay	1st place, gold medalist(s)	Australia	Peggy Macliver, Jean Hampson, Anne Lang, Marge Allison	5:32.95 WR
W70 4 x 400 Meters Relay	2nd place, silver medalist(s)	Germany	Vroni Lay, Hannelore Venn, Lydia Ritter, Diethild Nix	6:50.07
W70 4 x 400 Meters Relay	3rd place, bronze medalist(s)	Japan	Shimiko Okada, Tomoko Kanari, Masako Gemba, Ikuko Suzuki	8:01.69
W75 4 x 400 Meters Relay
W75 4 x 400 Meters Relay	1st place, gold medalist(s)	Mexico	Maria Celia Garcia Moreno, Ana Maria Ortiz Trapala, Juanita Aviles Sanchez, Ernestina Ramirez Garcia	8:46.29
W80 4 x 400 Meters Relay
W80 4 x 400 Meters Relay	1st place, gold medalist(s)	United States	Fei-Mei Chou, Mary Harada, Christel Donley, Irene Obera	8:39.32 WR
M35 4 x 400 Meters Relay; Heat 1 on YouTube; Heat 2 WR on YouTube
M35 4 x 400 Meters Relay; Heat 1 on YouTube; Heat 2 WR on YouTube	1st place, gold medalist(s)	Great Britain	Lawrence Baird, David Brown, Liam Collins, Richard Beardsell	3:17.82 WR
M35 4 x 400 Meters Relay; Heat 1 on YouTube; Heat 2 WR on YouTube	2nd place, silver medalist(s)	France	Imad Rahoui, Cedric Felip, Laurent esombes, Igor Flandrin-Thoniel	3:23.28
M35 4 x 400 Meters Relay; Heat 1 on YouTube; Heat 2 WR on YouTube	3rd place, bronze medalist(s)	Netherlands	Vincent Kerssies, Quinten Stern, Hendrik Van Rhee, Rico Rivers	3:26.37
M40 4 x 400 Meters Relay; Heat 1 on YouTube; Heat 2 on YouTube
M40 4 x 400 Meters Relay; Heat 1 on YouTube; Heat 2 on YouTube	1st place, gold medalist(s)	Great Britain	Richard Rubenis, Brian Darby, Mike Coogan, Graeme Harrison	3:26.38
M40 4 x 400 Meters Relay; Heat 1 on YouTube; Heat 2 on YouTube	2nd place, silver medalist(s)	Sweden	Magnus Nilsson, Jan Erlandsson, Peter Wallin, Mattias Sunneborn	3:27.20
M40 4 x 400 Meters Relay; Heat 1 on YouTube; Heat 2 on YouTube	3rd place, bronze medalist(s)	France	Jean-Marc Foricher, Christophe Chevaux, Mickaël Rincé, Jérôme Vignat	3:29.29
M45 4 x 400 Meters Relay
M45 4 x 400 Meters Relay	1st place, gold medalist(s)	United States	Robert Thomas, Lee Bridges, John Cormier, Don Drummond	3:29.62
M45 4 x 400 Meters Relay	2nd place, silver medalist(s)	France	Antoine Abatucci, Pierre Jean Maillot, Jean Michel Legrand, Fréderic Duclovel	3:32.07
M45 4 x 400 Meters Relay	3rd place, bronze medalist(s)	Great Britain	Michael O Osunsami, Leeroy Golding, Dominic Bokor-Ingram, Michael Gardiner	3:34.75
M50 4 x 400 Meters Relay
M50 4 x 400 Meters Relay	1st place, gold medalist(s)	United States	Marcus Shute, David Jones, Francois Boda, Terry Parks	3:34.54
M50 4 x 400 Meters Relay	2nd place, silver medalist(s)	France	Richard Berthenet, Jean Luc Duez, Belkacem Belmir, Boury Diouf	3:41.74
M50 4 x 400 Meters Relay	3rd place, bronze medalist(s)	Germany	Roland Gröger, Jürgen Hallmaier, Ernst Litau, Peter Oberliessen	3:45.65
M55 4 x 400 Meters Relay
M55 4 x 400 Meters Relay	1st place, gold medalist(s)	United States	James Chinn, William Yelverton, Allan Tissenbaum, Brent Cottong	3:48.33
M55 4 x 400 Meters Relay	2nd place, silver medalist(s)	Germany	Peter Hoell, Heiner Lüers, Lutz Scheffler, Gerhard Zorn	3:54.14
M55 4 x 400 Meters Relay	3rd place, bronze medalist(s)	Great Britain	Alastair Duncan, Bob Douglas, John Mayor, Tennyson James	3:56.20
M60 4 x 400 Meters Relay; Video on YouTube
M60 4 x 400 Meters Relay; Video on YouTube	1st place, gold medalist(s)	Germany	Wolfgang Kreemke, Wolfgang Thate, Rudolf König, Reinhard Michelchen	3:57.29
M60 4 x 400 Meters Relay; Video on YouTube	2nd place, silver medalist(s)	France	Jean Riou, Raoul Prado, Didier Barber, André Drutinus	4:02.79
M60 4 x 400 Meters Relay; Video on YouTube	3rd place, bronze medalist(s)	United States	George Haywood, Clyde "Chip" Crowl, Stephen Chantry, Roger Pierce	4:15.57
M65 4 x 400 Meters Relay
M65 4 x 400 Meters Relay	1st place, gold medalist(s)	Australia	Alan Coleman, Kevin Solomon, Peter Crombie, John Lamb	4:22.78
M65 4 x 400 Meters Relay	2nd place, silver medalist(s)	France	Jean-Luc Duval, Gaston Brard, Jean-Martin Allenbach, Daniel Débonnaire	4:26.29
M65 4 x 400 Meters Relay	3rd place, bronze medalist(s)	Italy	Franco Gasparinetti, Dario Rappo, Renato Goretti, Rudolf Frei	4:27.46
M70 4 x 400 Meters Relay; Video on YouTube
M70 4 x 400 Meters Relay; Video on YouTube	1st place, gold medalist(s)	Germany	Hans Schuck, Friedhelm Adorf, Egon Kleine-Homann, Hans-Jürgen Frühauf	4:38.02
M70 4 x 400 Meters Relay; Video on YouTube	2nd place, silver medalist(s)	Great Britain	Melvyn James, Terry Bissett, Laurence Oldfield, Winston Laing	4:40.62
M70 4 x 400 Meters Relay; Video on YouTube	3rd place, bronze medalist(s)	Finland	Jouko Ylä-Liedenpohja, Markku Juopperi, Antero Markunsalo, Aimo Mikkola	4:52.13
M75 4 x 400 Meters Relay; Video on YouTube
M75 4 x 400 Meters Relay; Video on YouTube	1st place, gold medalist(s)	Germany	Karl Jakob, Willi Klaus, Dr. Knorr Hartmann, Guido Müller	4:47.85 WR
M75 4 x 400 Meters Relay; Video on YouTube	2nd place, silver medalist(s)	Russia	Vladimir Lushchikov, Mikhail Burkot, Anatoly Blakitnyy, Anatoly Zorin	6:07.43
M75 4 x 400 Meters Relay; Video on YouTube	3rd place, bronze medalist(s)	Australia	Michael O'Reilly, David Carr, Allan Wood, Michael Stevenson	6:08.27
M80 4 x 400 Meters Relay
M80 4 x 400 Meters Relay	1st place, gold medalist(s)	Japan	Nobuo Ishikawa, Ryosuke Takahara, Sadao Tabira, Hiroo Tanaka	5:52.22
M80 4 x 400 Meters Relay	2nd place, silver medalist(s)	Germany	Dr. Horst Hufnagel, Karl-Heinz Neumann, Alfred Girault, Josef Zecha	6:36.14

=== Long Jump ===
Event	Pos	Athlete	Country	Result	Wind
W35 Long Jump
W35 Long Jump	1st place, gold medalist(s)	Joanne Frost	Great Britain	5.91m	-2.0
W35 Long Jump	2nd place, silver medalist(s)	Melissa Foster	Australia	5.72m	-1.0
W35 Long Jump	3rd place, bronze medalist(s)	Eugenie Reche-Boncoeur	France	5.59m	-1.0
W40 Long Jump
W40 Long Jump	1st place, gold medalist(s)	Marsha Mark-Baird	Trinidad and Tobago	5.78m	+0.2
W40 Long Jump	2nd place, silver medalist(s)	Nataliia Sorokina	Ukraine	5.61m	+0.0
W40 Long Jump	3rd place, bronze medalist(s)	Rachel Guest	United States	5.56m	+0.0
W45 Long Jump
W45 Long Jump	1st place, gold medalist(s)	Maria Costanza Moroni	Italy	5.61m	+1.3
W45 Long Jump	2nd place, silver medalist(s)	Renata Novosel	Croatia	5.32m	+1.2
W45 Long Jump	3rd place, bronze medalist(s)	Lenore Lambert	Australia	5.16m	+0.4
W50 Long Jump
W50 Long Jump	1st place, gold medalist(s)	Ramona Pfeiffer	Germany	4.92m	+0.8
W50 Long Jump	2nd place, silver medalist(s)	Birgit Burzlaff	Germany	4.89m	-2.3
W50 Long Jump	3rd place, bronze medalist(s)	Therry Buijs	Netherlands	4.68m	+0.0
W55 Long Jump
W55 Long Jump	1st place, gold medalist(s)	Marie Kay	Australia	4.82m	+0.0
W55 Long Jump	2nd place, silver medalist(s)	Loles Vives	Spain	4.80m	+0.0
W55 Long Jump	3rd place, bronze medalist(s)	Carole Filer	Great Britain	4.60m	+0.0
W60 Long Jump
W60 Long Jump	1st place, gold medalist(s)	Rita Hanscom	United States	4.34m	-0.2
W60 Long Jump	2nd place, silver medalist(s)	Anja Akkerman-Smits	Netherlands	4.20m	+0.4
W60 Long Jump	3rd place, bronze medalist(s)	Christina Friedrich	Germany	4.08m	+0.1
W65 Long Jump
W65 Long Jump	1st place, gold medalist(s)	Ingrid Meier	Germany	4.06m	+1.7
W65 Long Jump	2nd place, silver medalist(s)	Wilma Perkins	Australia	4.02m	+0.5
W65 Long Jump	3rd place, bronze medalist(s)	Kristina Dr. Hanke	Germany	3.83m	+0.3
W70 Long Jump
W70 Long Jump	1st place, gold medalist(s)	Marianne Maier	Austria	3.57m	+2.3
W70 Long Jump	2nd place, silver medalist(s)	Anne-Kathrin Eriksen	Germany	3.23m	+2.1
W70 Long Jump	3rd place, bronze medalist(s)	Hannelore Venn	Germany	3.19m	NWI
W75 Long Jump
W75 Long Jump	1st place, gold medalist(s)	Miriam Cudmore	Australia	3.39m	+0.4
W75 Long Jump	2nd place, silver medalist(s)	Christiane Schmalbruch	Germany	3.33m	+0.9
W75 Long Jump	3rd place, bronze medalist(s)	Christa Bortignon	Canada	3.27m	+0.6
W80 Long Jump
W80 Long Jump	1st place, gold medalist(s)	Irene Obera	United States	2.91m	+0.9
W80 Long Jump	2nd place, silver medalist(s)	Florence Meiler	United States	2.82m	+1.2
W80 Long Jump	3rd place, bronze medalist(s)	Natalia Aseeva	Russia	1.93m	+1.0
W85 Long Jump
W85 Long Jump	1st place, gold medalist(s)	Rosa Pedersen	Denmark	2.93m WR	-0.3
M35 Long Jump
M35 Long Jump	1st place, gold medalist(s)	Almicar Demetrio Bonell-Mora	Italy	7.43m	+0.0
M35 Long Jump	2nd place, silver medalist(s)	Laurent Sbeghen	France	7.39m	+1.8
M35 Long Jump	3rd place, bronze medalist(s)	Fernando Campo	Spain	7.25m	+0.2
M40 Long Jump
M40 Long Jump	1st place, gold medalist(s)	James Beckford	Jamaica	7.40m	+1.4
M40 Long Jump	2nd place, silver medalist(s)	Bakri Daroueche	France	7.08m	+1.0
M40 Long Jump	3rd place, bronze medalist(s)	Robert Lehmann	Australia	6.75m	+2.2
M45 Long Jump
M45 Long Jump	1st place, gold medalist(s)	Josué M'Bon	Switzerland	6.36m	+0.0
M45 Long Jump	2nd place, silver medalist(s)	Vladimir Pankratov	Russia	6.26m	+1.1
M45 Long Jump	3rd place, bronze medalist(s)	Alberto Tifi	Italy	6.24m	+0.8
M50 Long Jump
M50 Long Jump	1st place, gold medalist(s)	Gianni Becatti	Italy	6.44m	+2.4
M50 Long Jump	2nd place, silver medalist(s)	Oddvar Viulsrød	Norway	6.12m	+2.0
M50 Long Jump	3rd place, bronze medalist(s)	Amar Ben Mohamed	France	6.11m	+1.6
M55 Long Jump
M55 Long Jump	1st place, gold medalist(s)	Patrick Barbier	France	6.07m	+1.8
M55 Long Jump	2nd place, silver medalist(s)	Joel Pluton	France	5.78m	+1.9
M55 Long Jump	3rd place, bronze medalist(s)	Wai Ling Kung	Hong Kong	5.70m	+0.0
M60 Long Jump
M60 Long Jump	1st place, gold medalist(s)	Adrian Neagu	Romania	5.41m	+0.0
M60 Long Jump	2nd place, silver medalist(s)	Jouko Nikula	Finland	5.32m	+0.6
M60 Long Jump	3rd place, bronze medalist(s)	Evgenii Pudovnikov	Russia	5.30m	+0.7
M65 Long Jump
M65 Long Jump	1st place, gold medalist(s)	Alcides Francisco da Silva	Brazil	5.04m	+0.0
M65 Long Jump	2nd place, silver medalist(s)	Vesa Maki	Finland	4.87m	+1.2
M65 Long Jump	3rd place, bronze medalist(s)	Bernard Lejeune	France	4.86m	+0.2
M70 Long Jump
M70 Long Jump	1st place, gold medalist(s)	Friedhelm Adorf	Germany	4.49m	+0.3
M70 Long Jump	2nd place, silver medalist(s)	Jurgen Lamp	Estonia	4.41m	+0.2
M70 Long Jump	3rd place, bronze medalist(s)	Alexander Vnukov	Russia	4.33m	+0.8
M75 Long Jump
M75 Long Jump	1st place, gold medalist(s)	Juhan Tennasilm	Estonia	4.38m	+0.4
M75 Long Jump	2nd place, silver medalist(s)	Zhixiao Sun	China	4.33m	+0.7
M75 Long Jump	3rd place, bronze medalist(s)	Adolf Nehren	Germany	4.27m	-0.1
M80 Long Jump
M80 Long Jump	1st place, gold medalist(s)	Dick Richards	United States	3.78m	+0.8
M80 Long Jump	2nd place, silver medalist(s)	Timo Junttila	Finland	3.69m	-0.8
M80 Long Jump	3rd place, bronze medalist(s)	Ronald Cross	South Africa	3.49m	+0.9
M85 Long Jump
M85 Long Jump	1st place, gold medalist(s)	Wolfgang Reuter	Germany	3.51m	-0.1
M85 Long Jump	2nd place, silver medalist(s)	Yoshiyuki Shimizu	Brazil	3.47m	-0.6
M85 Long Jump	3rd place, bronze medalist(s)	Skaria John Poovathinkalmattakal	India	2.51m	-1.5
M90 Long Jump
M90 Long Jump	1st place, gold medalist(s)	Gerhard Windolf	Germany	2.30m	+0.7
M90 Long Jump	2nd place, silver medalist(s)	Hiroshi Miyamoto	Japan	2.08m	-0.4
M90 Long Jump	3rd place, bronze medalist(s)	Andreas Polychronopoulos	Greece	1.42m	+2.1
M95 Long Jump
M95 Long Jump	1st place, gold medalist(s)	Emmerich Zensch	Austria	2.15m WR	-0.4
M95 Long Jump	2nd place, silver medalist(s)	Valentin Huch	Spain	1.27m	+0.2

=== Triple Jump ===
Event	Pos	Athlete	Country	Result	Wind
W35 Triple Jump
W35 Triple Jump	1st place, gold medalist(s)	Melissa Foster	Australia	12.16m	+0.2
W35 Triple Jump	2nd place, silver medalist(s)	Jaroslava Vanecková	Czech Republic	11.55m	+1.0
W35 Triple Jump	3rd place, bronze medalist(s)	Marjorie Nicolaï	France	11.37m	+0.0
W40 Triple Jump
W40 Triple Jump	1st place, gold medalist(s)	Fiona Davidson	Great Britain	11.35m	+1.4
W40 Triple Jump	2nd place, silver medalist(s)	Maria Sokova	Russia	11.34m	+0.5
W40 Triple Jump	3rd place, bronze medalist(s)	Laila Petersone	Latvia	10.84m	+1.4
W45 Triple Jump
W45 Triple Jump	1st place, gold medalist(s)	Murielle Glovil	France	12.01m WR	+0.0
W45 Triple Jump	2nd place, silver medalist(s)	Desiree Henry	France	11.04m	+2.6
W45 Triple Jump	3rd place, bronze medalist(s)	Valentyna Krepkina	Ukraine	10.98m	+2.6
W50 Triple Jump
W50 Triple Jump	1st place, gold medalist(s)	Reeth Abraham	India	10.36m	+0.7
W50 Triple Jump	2nd place, silver medalist(s)	Francesca Iuri	Italy	9.88m	+2.1
W50 Triple Jump	3rd place, bronze medalist(s)	Dominique Beaufour	France	9.40m	+1.1
W55 Triple Jump
W55 Triple Jump	1st place, gold medalist(s)	Petra Herrmann	Germany	10.82m	+0.8
W55 Triple Jump	2nd place, silver medalist(s)	Maria Rosa Escribano Checa	Spain	10.24m	+0.0
W55 Triple Jump	3rd place, bronze medalist(s)	Conceição Aparecida Geremias	Brazil	10.23m	+1.4
W60 Triple Jump
W60 Triple Jump	1st place, gold medalist(s)	Chantal Freund	Switzerland	9.12m	+0.0
W60 Triple Jump	2nd place, silver medalist(s)	Christina Friedrich	Germany	9.03m	+0.0
W60 Triple Jump	3rd place, bronze medalist(s)	Irenilta Nunes	Brazil	8.50m	+0.3
W65 Triple Jump
W65 Triple Jump	1st place, gold medalist(s)	Terhi Kokkonen	Finland	8.30m	-1.1
W65 Triple Jump	2nd place, silver medalist(s)	Margaret Taylor	Australia	8.08m	+0.0
W65 Triple Jump	3rd place, bronze medalist(s)	Gertrude Reismann	Germany	8.08m	+0.0
W70 Triple Jump
W70 Triple Jump	1st place, gold medalist(s)	Erika Springmann	Germany	7.69m	+0.0
W70 Triple Jump	2nd place, silver medalist(s)	Iris Holder	Great Britain	7.11m	+0.0
W70 Triple Jump	3rd place, bronze medalist(s)	Jacqueline Wladika	Austria	6.39m	-0.8
W75 Triple Jump
W75 Triple Jump	1st place, gold medalist(s)	Christiane Schmalbruch	Germany	7.84m	
W75 Triple Jump	2nd place, silver medalist(s)	Rietje Dijkman	Netherlands	7.77m	
W75 Triple Jump	3rd place, bronze medalist(s)	Christa Bortignon	Canada	7.43m	
W80 Triple Jump
W80 Triple Jump	1st place, gold medalist(s)	Florence Meiler	United States	5.91m	+0.0
W80 Triple Jump	2nd place, silver medalist(s)	Christel Donley	United States	5.70m	+0.0
W80 Triple Jump	3rd place, bronze medalist(s)	Natalia Aseeva	Russia	4.54m	-1.4
W85 Triple Jump
W85 Triple Jump	1st place, gold medalist(s)	Maria Albertina Matulessy	Indonesia	4.16m	-2.4
W85 Triple Jump	2nd place, silver medalist(s)	Senni Sopanen	Finland	3.62m	-2.1
M35 Triple Jump
M35 Triple Jump	1st place, gold medalist(s)	Stavros Georgiou	Greece	15.02m	+0.5
M35 Triple Jump	2nd place, silver medalist(s)	Almicar Demetrio Bonell-Mora	Italy	15.01m	+1.7
M35 Triple Jump	3rd place, bronze medalist(s)	Andreas Beraz	Germany	14.92m	+1.2
M40 Triple Jump
M40 Triple Jump	1st place, gold medalist(s)	Samuel Okantey	Ghana	14.54m	-1.5
M40 Triple Jump	2nd place, silver medalist(s)	Maxime Mormin	France	14.17m	-0.5
M40 Triple Jump	3rd place, bronze medalist(s)	Hugues Valence	France	13.97m	-0.2
M45 Triple Jump
M45 Triple Jump	1st place, gold medalist(s)	Dmitry Byzov	Russia	14.15m	-1.5
M45 Triple Jump	2nd place, silver medalist(s)	Vladimir Pankratov	Russia	13.77m	-0.3
M45 Triple Jump	3rd place, bronze medalist(s)	Vasiliy Sokov	Russia	13.32m	-0.9
M50 Triple Jump
M50 Triple Jump	1st place, gold medalist(s)	André Briscan	France	13.29m	+1.5
M50 Triple Jump	2nd place, silver medalist(s)	Jose Quinaliza	Ecuador	13.12m	+1.5
M50 Triple Jump	3rd place, bronze medalist(s)	Alberto Quintano	Spain	13.11m	+1.2
M55 Triple Jump
M55 Triple Jump	1st place, gold medalist(s)	Wolfgang Knabe	Germany	13.89m	+0.2
M55 Triple Jump	2nd place, silver medalist(s)	Stanislaw Chmielewski	Poland	12.30m	+0.4
M55 Triple Jump	3rd place, bronze medalist(s)	Giancarlo Ciceri	Italy	11.95m	+0.3
M60 Triple Jump
M60 Triple Jump	1st place, gold medalist(s)	Valerii Zvezdkin	Russia	12.03m	+2.5
M60 Triple Jump	2nd place, silver medalist(s)	Arne Tefre	Norway	11.85m	+2.7
M60 Triple Jump	3rd place, bronze medalist(s)	Alexander Kornazhitskiy	Russia	11.81m	+2.3
M65 Triple Jump
M65 Triple Jump	1st place, gold medalist(s)	Leonid Kryazhkov	Russia	10.76m	+3.3
M65 Triple Jump	2nd place, silver medalist(s)	Valentin Stabrovskii	Russia	10.76m	+2.5
M65 Triple Jump	3rd place, bronze medalist(s)	Giuliano Costantini	Italy	10.73m	+1.5
M70 Triple Jump
M70 Triple Jump	1st place, gold medalist(s)	Jurgen Lamp	Estonia	10.18m	+0/3
M70 Triple Jump	2nd place, silver medalist(s)	Koji Nakamura	Japan	9.73m	+0.0
M70 Triple Jump	3rd place, bronze medalist(s)	Aleksandr Abramov	Russia	9.37m	-0.4
M75 Triple Jump
M75 Triple Jump	1st place, gold medalist(s)	Giorgio Maria Bortolozzi	Italy	8.96m	-0.4
M75 Triple Jump	2nd place, silver medalist(s)	Pinchas Shechter	Israel	8.76m	-0.5
M75 Triple Jump	3rd place, bronze medalist(s)	Janis Mankovskis	Latvia	8.69m	-0.6
M80 Triple Jump
M80 Triple Jump	1st place, gold medalist(s)	Timo Junttila	Finland	7.94m	+1.3
M80 Triple Jump	2nd place, silver medalist(s)	Nobuo Ishikawa	Japan	7.83m	+0.2
M80 Triple Jump	3rd place, bronze medalist(s)	Symeon Symeonidis	Greece	7.08m	+2.6
M85 Triple Jump
M85 Triple Jump	1st place, gold medalist(s)	Yoshiyuki Shimizu	Brazil	7.66m	-2.2
M85 Triple Jump	2nd place, silver medalist(s)	Wolfgang Reuter	Germany	6.87m	+1.1
M85 Triple Jump	3rd place, bronze medalist(s)	Horst Pfeiffer	Germany	6.65m	+0.5
M90 Triple Jump
M90 Triple Jump	1st place, gold medalist(s)	Hiroshi Miyamoto	Japan	4.48m	+1.4
M95 Triple Jump
M95 Triple Jump	1st place, gold medalist(s)	Emmerich Zensch	Austria	5.23m	+1.1
M95 Triple Jump	2nd place, silver medalist(s)	Valentin Huch	Spain	3.27m	+0.5

=== High Jump ===
Event	Pos	Athlete	Country	Result
W35 High Jump
W35 High Jump	1st place, gold medalist(s)	Chantal Felder	Austria	1.68m
W35 High Jump	2nd place, silver medalist(s)	Anja Wich-Heiter	Germany	1.62m
W35 High Jump	2nd place, silver medalist(s)	Audrey Hustache	France	1.62m
W40 High Jump
W40 High Jump	1st place, gold medalist(s)	Ayamba Akim	Great Britain	1.67m
W40 High Jump	2nd place, silver medalist(s)	Kitty Vadász	Hungary	1.60m
W40 High Jump	2nd place, silver medalist(s)	Laila Petersone	Latvia	1.60m
W45 High Jump
W45 High Jump	1st place, gold medalist(s)	Lolita Royer Nack	France	1.55m
W45 High Jump	2nd place, silver medalist(s)	Linda van Berkel	Netherlands	1.52m
W45 High Jump	3rd place, bronze medalist(s)	Ulrike Julien	Germany	1.48m
W50 High Jump
W50 High Jump	1st place, gold medalist(s)	Marcela Barrientos	Chile	1.55m
W50 High Jump	2nd place, silver medalist(s)	Sue McDonald	United States	1.51m
W50 High Jump	3rd place, bronze medalist(s)	Ramona Pfeiffer	Germany	1.47m
W55 High Jump
W55 High Jump	1st place, gold medalist(s)	Frauke Viebahn	Germany	1.48m
W55 High Jump	2nd place, silver medalist(s)	Carole Filer	Great Britain	1.38m
W55 High Jump	3rd place, bronze medalist(s)	Maria Rosa Escribano Checa	Spain	1.38m
W60 High Jump
W60 High Jump	1st place, gold medalist(s)	Rita Hanscom	United States	1.36m
W60 High Jump	2nd place, silver medalist(s)	Sue Yeomans	Great Britain	1.32m
W60 High Jump	3rd place, bronze medalist(s)	Stanka Prezelj	Slovenia	1.28m
W65 High Jump
W65 High Jump	1st place, gold medalist(s)	Weia Reinboud	Netherlands	1.39m
W65 High Jump	2nd place, silver medalist(s)	Annelies Steekelenburg	Netherlands	1.25m
W65 High Jump	3rd place, bronze medalist(s)	Margaret Taylor	Australia	1.20m
W70 High Jump
W70 High Jump	1st place, gold medalist(s)	Erika Springmann	Germany	1.17m
W70 High Jump	2nd place, silver medalist(s)	Marianne Maier	Austria	1.15m
W70 High Jump	3rd place, bronze medalist(s)	Helinä Pihlaja	Finland	1.12m
W75 High Jump
W75 High Jump	1st place, gold medalist(s)	Rietje Dijkman	Netherlands	1.22m WR
W75 High Jump	2nd place, silver medalist(s)	Kathy Bergen	United States	1.20m
W75 High Jump	3rd place, bronze medalist(s)	Christiane Schmalbruch	Germany	1.14m
W80 High Jump
W80 High Jump	1st place, gold medalist(s)	Christel Donley	United States	1.06m
W80 High Jump	2nd place, silver medalist(s)	Florence Meiler	United States	1.02m
W80 High Jump	3rd place, bronze medalist(s)	Leili Kaas	Estonia	0.96m
W85 High Jump
W85 High Jump	1st place, gold medalist(s)	Rosa Pedersen	Denmark	0.95m WR
W85 High Jump	2nd place, silver medalist(s)	Senni Sopanen	Finland	0.75m
M35 High Jump
M35 High Jump	1st place, gold medalist(s)	Sandro Finesi	Italy	2.05m
M35 High Jump	2nd place, silver medalist(s)	Kyley Johnson	United States	2.00m
M35 High Jump	2nd place, silver medalist(s)	Dieudonné Opota	France	2.00m
M35 High Jump	2nd place, silver medalist(s)	Roman Guliy	Portugal	2.00m
M40 High Jump
M40 High Jump	1st place, gold medalist(s)	Ola Karlsson	Sweden	1.99m
M40 High Jump	2nd place, silver medalist(s)	Peteris Valdmanis	Latvia	1.96m
M40 High Jump	3rd place, bronze medalist(s)	Nils Portemer	France	1.96m
M45 High Jump
M45 High Jump	1st place, gold medalist(s)	Ugis Lasmanis	Latvia	1.92m
M45 High Jump	2nd place, silver medalist(s)	Oleg Korotchenko	Ukraine	1.86m
M45 High Jump	3rd place, bronze medalist(s)	Vitalii Romanovich	Russia	1.83m
M50 High Jump
M50 High Jump	1st place, gold medalist(s)	Marco Segatel	Italy	1.86m
M50 High Jump	2nd place, silver medalist(s)	Oleg Kramar	Ukraine	1.83m
M50 High Jump	3rd place, bronze medalist(s)	Steven Linsell	Great Britain	1.75m
M55 High Jump
M55 High Jump	1st place, gold medalist(s)	Bruce McBarnette	United States	1.76m
M55 High Jump	2nd place, silver medalist(s)	Peter Hlavin	United States	1.73m
M55 High Jump	3rd place, bronze medalist(s)	Marc Flohr	Luxembourg	1.70m
M60 High Jump
M60 High Jump	1st place, gold medalist(s)	Eckhard Kunigkeit	Germany	1.71m
M60 High Jump	2nd place, silver medalist(s)	Matti Nieminen	Finland	1.68m
M60 High Jump	3rd place, bronze medalist(s)	Jaroslav Lorenc	Czech Republic	1.68m
M65 High Jump
M65 High Jump	1st place, gold medalist(s)	Dusan Prezelj	Slovenia	1.65m
M65 High Jump	2nd place, silver medalist(s)	Milan Jamrich	United States	1.56m
M65 High Jump	3rd place, bronze medalist(s)	Valdis Cela	Latvia	1.53m
M70 High Jump
M70 High Jump	1st place, gold medalist(s)	Petr Cech	Czech Republic	1.48m
M70 High Jump	2nd place, silver medalist(s)	Lamberto Boranga	Italy	1.48m
M70 High Jump	3rd place, bronze medalist(s)	Aleksandr Abramov	Russia	1.45m
M75 High Jump
M75 High Jump	1st place, gold medalist(s)	Daniel Fernandez Gonzalez	Spain	1.35m
M75 High Jump	2nd place, silver medalist(s)	Janis Mankovskis	Latvia	1.32m
M75 High Jump	3rd place, bronze medalist(s)	Willi Klaus	Germany	1.32m
M80 High Jump
M80 High Jump	1st place, gold medalist(s)	Henry Andersen	Denmark	1.28m
M80 High Jump	2nd place, silver medalist(s)	Ingvardt Sandsund	Norway	1.20m
M80 High Jump	3rd place, bronze medalist(s)	Nobuo Ishikawa	Japan	1.20m
M85 High Jump
M85 High Jump	1st place, gold medalist(s)	Wolfgang Reuter	Germany	1.12m
M85 High Jump	2nd place, silver medalist(s)	Friedmann Lösch Dr.	Germany	1.00m
M85 High Jump	3rd place, bronze medalist(s)	Pengxue Su	China	0.97m
M90 High Jump
M90 High Jump	1st place, gold medalist(s)	Gerhard Windolf	Germany	0.99m
M95 High Jump
M95 High Jump	1st place, gold medalist(s)	Emmerich Zensch	Austria	1.00m WR

=== Pole Vault ===
Event	Pos	Athlete	Country	Result
W35 Pole Vault
W35 Pole Vault	1st place, gold medalist(s)	Aurore Pignot	France	3.75m
W35 Pole Vault	2nd place, silver medalist(s)	Annemieke Dunnink	Netherlands	3.50m
W35 Pole Vault	3rd place, bronze medalist(s)	Jemma Eastwood	Great Britain	3.40m
W40 Pole Vault
W40 Pole Vault	1st place, gold medalist(s)	Valérie Chateau	France	3.20m
W40 Pole Vault	2nd place, silver medalist(s)	Katrin Friedrich	Germany	2.50m
W40 Pole Vault	3rd place, bronze medalist(s)	Claudia Cubbage	Great Britain	2.40m
W45 Pole Vault
W45 Pole Vault	1st place, gold medalist(s)	Irie Hill	Great Britain	3.60m
W45 Pole Vault	2nd place, silver medalist(s)	Alison Murray	Great Britain	3.20m
W45 Pole Vault	3rd place, bronze medalist(s)	Marisa Marcotegui	Spain	3.10m
W50 Pole Vault
W50 Pole Vault	1st place, gold medalist(s)	Pascale Wolff	France	2.70m
W50 Pole Vault	2nd place, silver medalist(s)	Annamaria Szanto	Canada	2.60m
W50 Pole Vault	2nd place, silver medalist(s)	Jacqueline Montgomery	Great Britain	2.60m
W55 Pole Vault
W55 Pole Vault	1st place, gold medalist(s)	Petra Herrmann	Germany	2.90m
W55 Pole Vault	1st place, gold medalist(s)	Brigitte van de Kamp Linneban	Netherlands	2.90m
W55 Pole Vault	3rd place, bronze medalist(s)	Carla Forcellini	Italy	2.70m
W60 Pole Vault
W60 Pole Vault	1st place, gold medalist(s)	Sue Yeomans	Great Britain	2.70m
W60 Pole Vault	1st place, gold medalist(s)	Rita Hanscom	United States	2.70m
W60 Pole Vault	3rd place, bronze medalist(s)	Ute Ritte	Germany	2.40m
W65 Pole Vault
W65 Pole Vault	1st place, gold medalist(s)	Wilma Perkins	Australia	2.11m
W65 Pole Vault	2nd place, silver medalist(s)	Birgitta Uppgården	Sweden	1.50m
W65 Pole Vault	3rd place, bronze medalist(s)	Mirtha Perez	Chile	1.50m
W70 Pole Vault
W70 Pole Vault	1st place, gold medalist(s)	Diethild Nix	Germany	2.11m
W70 Pole Vault	2nd place, silver medalist(s)	Sinikka Erjavaara	Finland	1.40m
W70 Pole Vault	3rd place, bronze medalist(s)	Ellyn Hardison	United States	1.25m
W80 Pole Vault
W80 Pole Vault	1st place, gold medalist(s)	Florence Meiler	United States	1.80m
M35 Pole Vault
M35 Pole Vault	1st place, gold medalist(s)	Pierre-Charles Peuf	France	5.10m
M35 Pole Vault	2nd place, silver medalist(s)	Gaspar Mateu Carceller	Spain	4.85m
M35 Pole Vault	3rd place, bronze medalist(s)	Dr. Thomas Ritte	Germany	4.75m
M40 Pole Vault
M40 Pole Vault	1st place, gold medalist(s)	Pascal Elisabeth	France	4.65m
M40 Pole Vault	2nd place, silver medalist(s)	Rodolphe Dodier	France	4.50m
M40 Pole Vault	3rd place, bronze medalist(s)	Jonas Asplund	Sweden	4.50m
M45 Pole Vault
M45 Pole Vault	1st place, gold medalist(s)	Grigoriy Yegorov	Spain	4.50m
M45 Pole Vault	2nd place, silver medalist(s)	Giacomo Befani	Italy	4.40m
M45 Pole Vault	3rd place, bronze medalist(s)	Eric Benezech	France	4.20m
M50 Pole Vault
M50 Pole Vault	1st place, gold medalist(s)	Francisco Javier Hernandez Rivero	Spain	4.15m
M50 Pole Vault	2nd place, silver medalist(s)	Marc Spony	France	4.05m
M50 Pole Vault	3rd place, bronze medalist(s)	Emerson Obiena	Philippines	4.05m
M55 Pole Vault
M55 Pole Vault	1st place, gold medalist(s)	Wendell Beck	United States	4.05m
M55 Pole Vault	2nd place, silver medalist(s)	Alfred Achtelik	Germany	4.00m
M55 Pole Vault	3rd place, bronze medalist(s)	Chokri Abahnini	Tunisia	3.80m
M60 Pole Vault
M60 Pole Vault	1st place, gold medalist(s)	Wolfgang Ritte	Germany	4.00m
M60 Pole Vault	2nd place, silver medalist(s)	Ivo Strnad	Czech Republic	3.50m
M60 Pole Vault	3rd place, bronze medalist(s)	Rolf Nucklies	Germany	3.30m
M65 Pole Vault
M65 Pole Vault	1st place, gold medalist(s)	Karel Fiedler	Czech Republic	3.40m
M65 Pole Vault	2nd place, silver medalist(s)	Reima Oinaanoja	Finland	3.30m
M65 Pole Vault	3rd place, bronze medalist(s)	Valdis Cela	Latvia	3.20m
M70 Pole Vault
M70 Pole Vault	1st place, gold medalist(s)	Veikko Makela	Finland	2.90m
M70 Pole Vault	2nd place, silver medalist(s)	Albert Gay	Australia	2.85m
M70 Pole Vault	3rd place, bronze medalist(s)	Mati Tiidre	Estonia	2.80m
M75 Pole Vault
M75 Pole Vault	1st place, gold medalist(s)	Zoltan Kurunczi	Hungary	2.82m
M75 Pole Vault	2nd place, silver medalist(s)	Siegbert Gnoth	Germany	2.60m
M75 Pole Vault	3rd place, bronze medalist(s)	Hans Lagerqvist	Sweden	2.50m
M80 Pole Vault
M80 Pole Vault	1st place, gold medalist(s)	Lars Wennblom	Sweden	2.55m
M80 Pole Vault	2nd place, silver medalist(s)	Symeon Symeonidis	Greece	2.30m
M80 Pole Vault	3rd place, bronze medalist(s)	Tadashi Horino	Japan	2.25m
M85 Pole Vault
M85 Pole Vault	1st place, gold medalist(s)	Munehiro Toriya	Japan	1.80m
M85 Pole Vault	2nd place, silver medalist(s)	Jerry Donley	United States	1.60m

=== Shot Put ===
Event	Pos	Athlete	Country	Result
W35 Shot Put
W35 Shot Put	1st place, gold medalist(s)	Nadine Kant	Germany	14.82m
W35 Shot Put	2nd place, silver medalist(s)	Catarina Andersson	Sweden	14.07m
W35 Shot Put	3rd place, bronze medalist(s)	Amaia Dublang	Spain	13.72m
W40 Shot Put
W40 Shot Put	1st place, gold medalist(s)	Dunja Koch	Germany	13.80m
W40 Shot Put	2nd place, silver medalist(s)	Camille Cayet	France	12.59m
W40 Shot Put	3rd place, bronze medalist(s)	Geraldine George	Trinidad and Tobago	11.93m
W45 Shot Put
W45 Shot Put	1st place, gold medalist(s)	Kristina Telge	Germany	11.47m
W45 Shot Put	2nd place, silver medalist(s)	Ellen Weller	Germany	11.25m
W45 Shot Put	3rd place, bronze medalist(s)	Gabriele Watts	Australia	11.22m
W50 Shot Put
W50 Shot Put	1st place, gold medalist(s)	Marcela Barrientos	Chile	14.56m
W50 Shot Put	2nd place, silver medalist(s)	Jana Müller Schmidt	Germany	14.38m
W50 Shot Put	3rd place, bronze medalist(s)	Gwendolyn Smith	Trinidad and Tobago	13.35m
W55 Shot Put
W55 Shot Put	1st place, gold medalist(s)	Conceição Aparecida Geremias	Brazil	12.94m
W55 Shot Put	2nd place, silver medalist(s)	Claudette Nilusmas	France	12.89m
W55 Shot Put	3rd place, bronze medalist(s)	Yaneth Tenorio	Colombia	11.99m
W60 Shot Put
W60 Shot Put	1st place, gold medalist(s)	Mihaela Loghin	Romania	12.63m
W60 Shot Put	2nd place, silver medalist(s)	Hermine Bajare	Latvia	11.07m
W60 Shot Put	3rd place, bronze medalist(s)	Anne Kirstine Jensen	Denmark	11.01m
W65 Shot Put
W65 Shot Put	1st place, gold medalist(s)	Edith Anderes	Switzerland	10.23m
W65 Shot Put	2nd place, silver medalist(s)	Genovaite Kazlauskiene	Lithuania	9.87m
W65 Shot Put	3rd place, bronze medalist(s)	Mária Terézia Gosztolai	Hungary	9.57m
W70 Shot Put
W70 Shot Put	1st place, gold medalist(s)	Marianne Maier	Austria	10.29m
W70 Shot Put	2nd place, silver medalist(s)	Carol Frost	United States	10.12m
W70 Shot Put	3rd place, bronze medalist(s)	Tomoko Kanari	Japan	9.26m
W75 Shot Put
W75 Shot Put	1st place, gold medalist(s)	Genevieve Cathalau	France	10.33m
W75 Shot Put	2nd place, silver medalist(s)	Masako Gemba	Japan	9.35m
W75 Shot Put	3rd place, bronze medalist(s)	Tserendolgor Tumurbat	Mongolia	9.03m
W80 Shot Put
W80 Shot Put	1st place, gold medalist(s)	Galina Kovalenskaya	Russia	8.58m
W80 Shot Put	2nd place, silver medalist(s)	Asta Satsi	Estonia	8.03m
W80 Shot Put	3rd place, bronze medalist(s)	Leili Kaas	Estonia	7.35m
W85 Shot Put
W85 Shot Put	1st place, gold medalist(s)	Rachel Hanssens	Belgium	7.15m
W85 Shot Put	2nd place, silver medalist(s)	Austra Reinberga	Latvia	7.08m
W90 Shot Put
W90 Shot Put	1st place, gold medalist(s)	Nora Kutti	Estonia	5.59m
M35 Shot Put
M35 Shot Put	1st place, gold medalist(s)	Dubravko Brdovcak	Croatia	16.99m
M35 Shot Put	2nd place, silver medalist(s)	Petros Mitsides	Cyprus	15.32m
M35 Shot Put	3rd place, bronze medalist(s)	Gregory Bottier	France	14.48m
M40 Shot Put
M40 Shot Put	1st place, gold medalist(s)	Jean-Pierre Horbaty	France	16.04m
M40 Shot Put	2nd place, silver medalist(s)	Carlos Gerones	Spain	15.92m
M40 Shot Put	3rd place, bronze medalist(s)	Pakinder Singh	India	14.11m
M45 Shot Put
M45 Shot Put	1st place, gold medalist(s)	Tilman Northoff	Germany	16.41m
M45 Shot Put	2nd place, silver medalist(s)	Mark Wiseman	Great Britain	14.09m
M45 Shot Put	3rd place, bronze medalist(s)	Gerald Scandella	France	13.63m
M50 Shot Put
M50 Shot Put	1st place, gold medalist(s)	Marek Stolarczyk	Poland	15.09m
M50 Shot Put	2nd place, silver medalist(s)	Karsten Schneider	Germany	14.32m
M50 Shot Put	3rd place, bronze medalist(s)	Michael Bruun Jepsen	Denmark	13.93m
M55 Shot Put
M55 Shot Put	1st place, gold medalist(s)	Karri Westerlund	Finland	14.61m
M55 Shot Put	2nd place, silver medalist(s)	Mikhail Kostin	Russia	14.45m
M55 Shot Put	3rd place, bronze medalist(s)	Marco Giacomini	Italy	14.20m
M60 Shot Put
M60 Shot Put	1st place, gold medalist(s)	Vasileios Manganas	Greece	14.71m
M60 Shot Put	2nd place, silver medalist(s)	Roland Wattenbach	Germany	14.59m
M60 Shot Put	3rd place, bronze medalist(s)	Joseph Myers	United States	14.42m
M65 Shot Put
M65 Shot Put	1st place, gold medalist(s)	Tim Muller	United States	14.17m
M65 Shot Put	2nd place, silver medalist(s)	Arlid Busterud	Norway	14.06m
M65 Shot Put	3rd place, bronze medalist(s)	Hansruedi Stäheli	Switzerland	13.60m
M70 Shot Put
M70 Shot Put	1st place, gold medalist(s)	Felix Mohr	Germany	13.99m
M70 Shot Put	2nd place, silver medalist(s)	Glenn Sasser	United States	13.60m
M70 Shot Put	3rd place, bronze medalist(s)	Czeslaw Roszczak	Poland	12.93m
M75 Shot Put
M75 Shot Put	1st place, gold medalist(s)	Dick Schrieken	Netherlands	12.36m
M75 Shot Put	2nd place, silver medalist(s)	Heikki Yli-Erkkilä	Finland	12.09m
M75 Shot Put	3rd place, bronze medalist(s)	Jouni Tenhu	Finland	11.85m
M80 Shot Put
M80 Shot Put	1st place, gold medalist(s)	Lothar Huchthausen	Germany	12.72m
M80 Shot Put	2nd place, silver medalist(s)	Östen Edlund	Sweden	12.42m
M80 Shot Put	3rd place, bronze medalist(s)	Anton Laus	Estonia	11.23m
M85 Shot Put
M85 Shot Put	1st place, gold medalist(s)	Leo Saarinen	Finland	10.29m
M85 Shot Put	2nd place, silver medalist(s)	Radomir Skoko	Serbia	9.46m
M85 Shot Put	3rd place, bronze medalist(s)	René Turpin	France	8.39m
M90 Shot Put
M90 Shot Put	1st place, gold medalist(s)	Lauri Helle	Finland	8.38m
M90 Shot Put	2nd place, silver medalist(s)	Paul Ebinger	Switzerland	8.14m
M90 Shot Put	3rd place, bronze medalist(s)	Gerhard Windolf	Germany	7.56m
M95 Shot Put
M95 Shot Put	1st place, gold medalist(s)	Emmerich Zensch	Austria	6.51m
M95 Shot Put	2nd place, silver medalist(s)	Frederico Fischer	Brazil	6.28m
M95 Shot Put	3rd place, bronze medalist(s)	Valentin Huch	Spain	4.41m

=== Discus Throw ===
Event	Pos	Athlete	Country	Result
W35 Discus Throw
W35 Discus Throw	1st place, gold medalist(s)	Marie-Josee Le Jour	Canada	46.84m
W35 Discus Throw	2nd place, silver medalist(s)	Inga Reschke	Germany	45.10m
W35 Discus Throw	3rd place, bronze medalist(s)	Amaia Dublang	Spain	40.81m
W40 Discus Throw
W40 Discus Throw	1st place, gold medalist(s)	Bettina Schardt	Germany	44.81m
W40 Discus Throw	2nd place, silver medalist(s)	Dunja Koch	Germany	42.66m
W40 Discus Throw	3rd place, bronze medalist(s)	Klaudia Sieklinska	Poland	39.67m
W45 Discus Throw
W45 Discus Throw	1st place, gold medalist(s)	Sylvie Servant	France	41.17m
W45 Discus Throw	2nd place, silver medalist(s)	Malgorzata Krzyzan	Poland	39.10m
W45 Discus Throw	3rd place, bronze medalist(s)	Silke Stolt	Germany	37.52m
W50 Discus Throw
W50 Discus Throw	1st place, gold medalist(s)	Olga Chernyavskaya	Russia	46.11m WR
W50 Discus Throw	2nd place, silver medalist(s)	Eha Rünne	Estonia	44.87m
W50 Discus Throw	3rd place, bronze medalist(s)	Marcela Barrientos	Chile	40.72m
W55 Discus Throw
W55 Discus Throw	1st place, gold medalist(s)	Carol Finsrud	United States	38.20m
W55 Discus Throw	2nd place, silver medalist(s)	Mare Külv	Estonia	34.78m
W55 Discus Throw	3rd place, bronze medalist(s)	Alexandra Marghieva	Moldova	32.61m
W60 Discus Throw
W60 Discus Throw	1st place, gold medalist(s)	Anne Kirstine Jensen	Denmark	31.19m
W60 Discus Throw	2nd place, silver medalist(s)	Hermine Bajare	Latvia	30.51m
W60 Discus Throw	3rd place, bronze medalist(s)	Lone Soerensen	Denmark	29.33m
W65 Discus Throw
W65 Discus Throw	1st place, gold medalist(s)	Inge Faldager	Denmark	30.05m
W65 Discus Throw	2nd place, silver medalist(s)	Margarethe Tomanek	Belgium	28.01m
W65 Discus Throw	3rd place, bronze medalist(s)	Mária Terézia Gosztolai	Hungary	26.30m
W70 Discus Throw
W70 Discus Throw	1st place, gold medalist(s)	Carol Frost	United States	26.86m
W70 Discus Throw	2nd place, silver medalist(s)	Maria Luisa Fancello	Italy	26.14m
W70 Discus Throw	3rd place, bronze medalist(s)	Tomoko Kanari	Japan	25.19m
W75 Discus Throw
W75 Discus Throw	1st place, gold medalist(s)	Helvi Erikson	Estonia	22.82m
W75 Discus Throw	2nd place, silver medalist(s)	Masako Gemba	Japan	22.44m
W75 Discus Throw	3rd place, bronze medalist(s)	Maria Kern	Germany	21.69m
W80 Discus Throw
W80 Discus Throw	1st place, gold medalist(s)	Galina Kovalenskaya	Russia	19.84m
W80 Discus Throw	2nd place, silver medalist(s)	Asta Satsi	Estonia	19.17m
W80 Discus Throw	3rd place, bronze medalist(s)	Florence Meiler	United States	17.93m
W85 Discus Throw
W85 Discus Throw	1st place, gold medalist(s)	Rachel Hanssens	Belgium	16.97m
W85 Discus Throw	2nd place, silver medalist(s)	Hilja Bakhoff	Estonia	14.38m
W85 Discus Throw	3rd place, bronze medalist(s)	Austra Reinberga	Latvia	13.00m
W90 Discus Throw
W90 Discus Throw	1st place, gold medalist(s)	Nora Kutti	Estonia	13.06m
M35 Discus Throw
M35 Discus Throw	1st place, gold medalist(s)	Petros Mitsides	Cyprus	50.94m
M35 Discus Throw	2nd place, silver medalist(s)	Loic Fournet	France	49.69m
M35 Discus Throw	3rd place, bronze medalist(s)	Ivan Tirado	Spain	48.13m
M40 Discus Throw
M40 Discus Throw	1st place, gold medalist(s)	Mika Loikkanen	Finland	50.89m
M40 Discus Throw	2nd place, silver medalist(s)	Fco Javier Guzman Ares	Spain	47.32m
M40 Discus Throw	3rd place, bronze medalist(s)	Erik Boës	France	47.17m
M45 Discus Throw
M45 Discus Throw	1st place, gold medalist(s)	Mark Wiseman	Great Britain	49.80m
M45 Discus Throw	2nd place, silver medalist(s)	Michaël Glenn Conjungo	France	48.55m
M45 Discus Throw	3rd place, bronze medalist(s)	Pavel Penáz	Czech Republic	45.87m
M50 Discus Throw
M50 Discus Throw	1st place, gold medalist(s)	Norbert Demmel	Germany	54.50m
M50 Discus Throw	2nd place, silver medalist(s)	Marek Stolarczyk	Poland	53.56m
M50 Discus Throw	3rd place, bronze medalist(s)	Pekka Jaakkola	Finland	50.09m
M55 Discus Throw
M55 Discus Throw	1st place, gold medalist(s)	Tom Jensen	Denmark	47.32m
M55 Discus Throw	2nd place, silver medalist(s)	Mariusz Gurzeda	Poland	47.22m
M55 Discus Throw	3rd place, bronze medalist(s)	Rolf Heinzmann	Germany	46.27m
M60 Discus Throw
M60 Discus Throw	1st place, gold medalist(s)	Ralph Fruguglietti	United States	57.16m
M60 Discus Throw	2nd place, silver medalist(s)	John Goldhammer	United States	51.60m
M60 Discus Throw	3rd place, bronze medalist(s)	Sandor Katona	France	48.22m
M65 Discus Throw
M65 Discus Throw	1st place, gold medalist(s)	Milos Gryc	Czech Republic	47.89m
M65 Discus Throw	2nd place, silver medalist(s)	Kjell Adamski	Norway	46.87m
M65 Discus Throw	3rd place, bronze medalist(s)	Arlid Busterud	Norway	46.70m
M70 Discus Throw
M70 Discus Throw	1st place, gold medalist(s)	Julio Calvo Redondo	Spain	47.31m
M70 Discus Throw	2nd place, silver medalist(s)	Bill Hiney	United States	43.54m
M70 Discus Throw	3rd place, bronze medalist(s)	Frantisek Uhlik	Czech Republic	43.48m
M75 Discus Throw
M75 Discus Throw	1st place, gold medalist(s)	Dick Schrieken	Netherlands	37.95m
M75 Discus Throw	2nd place, silver medalist(s)	Alain Guillon	France	34.02m
M75 Discus Throw	3rd place, bronze medalist(s)	Johann Hansen	Germany	33.18m
M80 Discus Throw
M80 Discus Throw	1st place, gold medalist(s)	Östen Edlund	Sweden	37.94m
M80 Discus Throw	2nd place, silver medalist(s)	Peter Speckens	Germany	32.51m
M80 Discus Throw	3rd place, bronze medalist(s)	Takumi Matsushima	Brazil	31.85m
M85 Discus Throw
M85 Discus Throw	1st place, gold medalist(s)	Radomir Skoko	Serbia	21.79m
M85 Discus Throw	2nd place, silver medalist(s)	Wolfgang Reuter	Germany	21.56m
M85 Discus Throw	3rd place, bronze medalist(s)	Leo Saarinen	Finland	21.18m
M90 Discus Throw
M90 Discus Throw	1st place, gold medalist(s)	Walter Reidinger	Austria	19.79m
M90 Discus Throw	2nd place, silver medalist(s)	Paul Ebinger	Switzerland	17.88m
M90 Discus Throw	3rd place, bronze medalist(s)	Mamoru Ussami	Brazil	14.34m
M95 Discus Throw
M95 Discus Throw	1st place, gold medalist(s)	Emmerich Zensch	Austria	14.57m
M95 Discus Throw	2nd place, silver medalist(s)	Frederico Fischer	Brazil	13.21m
M95 Discus Throw	3rd place, bronze medalist(s)	Valentin Huch	Spain	11.34m

=== Hammer Throw ===
Event	Pos	Athlete	Country	Result
W35 Hammer throw
W35 Hammer throw	1st place, gold medalist(s)	Kirsten Münchow	Germany	55.57m
W35 Hammer throw	2nd place, silver medalist(s)	Kirsi Koro	Finland	52.50m
W35 Hammer throw	3rd place, bronze medalist(s)	Marie-Josee Le Jour	Canada	49.95m
W40 Hammer throw
W40 Hammer throw	1st place, gold medalist(s)	Laurence Reckelbus	Belgium	43.64m
W40 Hammer throw	2nd place, silver medalist(s)	Camilla Mattsson	Sweden	43.43m
W40 Hammer throw	3rd place, bronze medalist(s)	Virginie Scribe	France	43.27m
W45 Hammer throw
W45 Hammer throw	1st place, gold medalist(s)	Gabriele Engelhardt	Germany	45.49m
W45 Hammer throw	2nd place, silver medalist(s)	Tiina Ranta	Finland	41.98m
W45 Hammer throw	3rd place, bronze medalist(s)	Althea Mackie	Australia	41.47m
W50 Hammer throw
W50 Hammer throw	1st place, gold medalist(s)	Claudine Cacaut	France	53.32m
W50 Hammer throw	2nd place, silver medalist(s)	Heleen Knobel	South Africa	49.23m
W50 Hammer throw	3rd place, bronze medalist(s)	Gonny Mik	Netherlands	49.06m
W55 Hammer throw
W55 Hammer throw	1st place, gold medalist(s)	Marilyn Vignot	France	42.21m
W55 Hammer throw	2nd place, silver medalist(s)	Mägy Duss	Switzerland	41.00m
W55 Hammer throw	3rd place, bronze medalist(s)	Sylvie Galleazzi	France	40.52m
W60 Hammer throw
W60 Hammer throw	1st place, gold medalist(s)	Magdolna Benes	Hungary	38.29m
W60 Hammer throw	2nd place, silver medalist(s)	Anne Kirstine Jensen	Denmark	36.63m
W60 Hammer throw	3rd place, bronze medalist(s)	Anna Matusova	Slovakia	35.29m
W65 Hammer throw
W65 Hammer throw	1st place, gold medalist(s)	Inge Faldager	Denmark	40.20m
W65 Hammer throw	2nd place, silver medalist(s)	Eva Nohl	Germany	39.05m
W65 Hammer throw	3rd place, bronze medalist(s)	Margarethe Tomanek	Belgium	38.46m
W70 Hammer throw
W70 Hammer throw	1st place, gold medalist(s)	Maria Luisa Fancello	Italy	31.84m
W70 Hammer throw	2nd place, silver medalist(s)	Janice Banens	Australia	30.19m
W70 Hammer throw	3rd place, bronze medalist(s)	Mary Thomas	Australia	29.71m
W75 Hammer throw
W75 Hammer throw	1st place, gold medalist(s)	Helvi Erikson	Estonia	31.80m
W75 Hammer throw	2nd place, silver medalist(s)	Brigitte Schmidt	Germany	28.51m
W75 Hammer throw	3rd place, bronze medalist(s)	Ingrid Schäfer	Germany	26.86m
W80 Hammer throw
W80 Hammer throw	1st place, gold medalist(s)	Christa Winkelmann	Germany	25.65m
W80 Hammer throw	2nd place, silver medalist(s)	Valerie Worrel	Australia	25.63m
W80 Hammer throw	3rd place, bronze medalist(s)	Eila Mikola	Finland	23.93m
W85 Hammer throw
W85 Hammer throw	1st place, gold medalist(s)	Rachel Hanssens	Belgium	21.75m
W85 Hammer throw	2nd place, silver medalist(s)	Hilja Bakhoff	Estonia	19.57m
W85 Hammer throw	3rd place, bronze medalist(s)	Marcia Petley	New Zealand	16.19m
W90 Hammer throw
W90 Hammer throw	1st place, gold medalist(s)	Nora Kutti	Estonia	12.86m
M35 Hammer throw
M35 Hammer throw	1st place, gold medalist(s)	Juhana Makela	Finland	56.84m
M35 Hammer throw	2nd place, silver medalist(s)	Jason Baines	Canada	55.47m
M35 Hammer throw	3rd place, bronze medalist(s)	Wilfrid Poretto	France	48.82m
M40 Hammer throw
M40 Hammer throw	1st place, gold medalist(s)	Mariusz Walczak	Poland	64.92m
M40 Hammer throw	2nd place, silver medalist(s)	Michel Andre	France	57.46m
M40 Hammer throw	3rd place, bronze medalist(s)	Martin Venter	South Africa	52.52m
M45 Hammer throw
M45 Hammer throw	1st place, gold medalist(s)	Zoltán Fábián	Hungary	63.95m
M45 Hammer throw	2nd place, silver medalist(s)	Adrian Marzo	Argentina	56.96m
M45 Hammer throw	3rd place, bronze medalist(s)	Laurent Bettolo	France	56.23m
M50 Hammer throw
M50 Hammer throw	1st place, gold medalist(s)	Balázs Lezsák	Hungary	62.11m
M50 Hammer throw	2nd place, silver medalist(s)	Gudmundur Karlsson	Iceland	58.80m
M50 Hammer throw	3rd place, bronze medalist(s)	Yury Kurilkin	Russia	55.74m
M55 Hammer throw
M55 Hammer throw	1st place, gold medalist(s)	Gottfried Gassenbauer	Austria	54.92m
M55 Hammer throw	2nd place, silver medalist(s)	Victor Bobryshev	Russia	54.41m
M55 Hammer throw	3rd place, bronze medalist(s)	Tom Jensen	Denmark	52.66m
M60 Hammer throw
M60 Hammer throw	1st place, gold medalist(s)	John Goldhammer	United States	56.42m
M60 Hammer throw	2nd place, silver medalist(s)	Vasileios Manganas	Greece	55.69m
M60 Hammer throw	3rd place, bronze medalist(s)	Heikki Kangas	Finland	52.76m
M65 Hammer throw
M65 Hammer throw	1st place, gold medalist(s)	Arlid Busterud	Norway	57.93m
M65 Hammer throw	2nd place, silver medalist(s)	Boris Zaitchouk	Canada	52.67m
M65 Hammer throw	3rd place, bronze medalist(s)	Kenneth Jansson	Sweden	48.24m
M70 Hammer throw
M70 Hammer throw	1st place, gold medalist(s)	Heimo Viertbauer	Austria	51.92m
M70 Hammer throw	2nd place, silver medalist(s)	Gérard Guyo]	France	50.19m
M70 Hammer throw	3rd place, bronze medalist(s)	Jerzy Jablonski	Poland	49.25m
M75 Hammer throw
M75 Hammer throw	1st place, gold medalist(s)	Hermann Albrecht	Germany	50.00m
M75 Hammer throw	2nd place, silver medalist(s)	Andrzej Rzepecki	South Africa	40.42m
M75 Hammer throw	3rd place, bronze medalist(s)	Gilbert Storq	France	39.37m
M80 Hammer throw
M80 Hammer throw	1st place, gold medalist(s)	Jose Maria Sanza Agreda	Spain	49.53m WR
M80 Hammer throw	2nd place, silver medalist(s)	Peter Speckens	Germany	44.11m
M80 Hammer throw	3rd place, bronze medalist(s)	Östen Edlund	Sweden	42.08m
M85 Hammer throw
M85 Hammer throw	1st place, gold medalist(s)	Leo Saarinen	Finland	31.49m
M85 Hammer throw	2nd place, silver medalist(s)	Richard Rzehak	Germany	28.10m
M85 Hammer throw	3rd place, bronze medalist(s)	Viljo Hyvölä	Finland	24.06m
M90 Hammer throw
M90 Hammer throw	1st place, gold medalist(s)	Hugh Gallagher	Ireland	17.08m
M90 Hammer throw	2nd place, silver medalist(s)	Angel Esteban Assimontti Aquino	Uruguay	16.87m
M95 Hammer throw
M95 Hammer throw	1st place, gold medalist(s)	Frederico Fischer	Brazil	16.62m

=== Weight Throw ===
Event	Pos	Athlete	Country	Result
W35 Weight Throw
W35 Weight Throw	1st place, gold medalist(s)	Kirsi Koro	Finland	16.63m
W35 Weight Throw	2nd place, silver medalist(s)	Byrony Glass	Australia	16.54m
W35 Weight Throw	3rd place, bronze medalist(s)	Marie-Josee Le Jour	Canada	16.12m
W40 Weight Throw
W40 Weight Throw	1st place, gold medalist(s)	Elizabeth Teague	United States	13.55m
W40 Weight Throw	2nd place, silver medalist(s)	Laurence Reckelbus	Belgium	13.06m
W40 Weight Throw	3rd place, bronze medalist(s)	Anna Ek	Sweden	12.85m
W45 Weight Throw
W45 Weight Throw	1st place, gold medalist(s)	Althea Mackie	Australia	13.57m
W45 Weight Throw	2nd place, silver medalist(s)	Mireille Tonizzo-Kosmala	Luxembourg	13.42m
W45 Weight Throw	3rd place, bronze medalist(s)	Heidi Siimumäe	Estonia	13.34m
W50 Weight Throw
W50 Weight Throw	1st place, gold medalist(s)	Gonny Mik	Netherlands	16.27m
W50 Weight Throw	2nd place, silver medalist(s)	Heleen Knobel	South Africa	15.60m
W50 Weight Throw	3rd place, bronze medalist(s)	Claudine Cacaut	France	15.29m
W55 Weight Throw
W55 Weight Throw	1st place, gold medalist(s)	Carol Finsrud	United States	13.59m
W55 Weight Throw	2nd place, silver medalist(s)	Mägy Duss	Switzerland	13.47m
W55 Weight Throw	3rd place, bronze medalist(s)	Sharon Gibbins	Australia	12.58m
W60 Weight Throw
W60 Weight Throw	1st place, gold medalist(s)	Magdolna Benes	Hungary	14.71m
W60 Weight Throw	2nd place, silver medalist(s)	Lone Soerensen	Denmark	14.07m
W60 Weight Throw	3rd place, bronze medalist(s)	Anne Kirstine Jensen	Denmark	13.87m
W65 Weight Throw
W65 Weight Throw	1st place, gold medalist(s)	Inge Faldager	Denmark	14.82m
W65 Weight Throw	2nd place, silver medalist(s)	Annie van Anholt	Netherlands	14.78m
W65 Weight Throw	3rd place, bronze medalist(s)	Margarethe Tomanek	Belgium	14.56m
W70 Weight Throw
W70 Weight Throw	1st place, gold medalist(s)	Mary Thomas	Australia	11.39m
W70 Weight Throw	2nd place, silver medalist(s)	Janice Banens	Australia	11.31m
W70 Weight Throw	3rd place, bronze medalist(s)	Marita Horn	Germany	10.86m
W75 Weight Throw
W75 Weight Throw	1st place, gold medalist(s)	Helvi Erikson	Estonia	12.97m
W75 Weight Throw	2nd place, silver medalist(s)	Ingrid Schäfer	Germany	10.68m
W75 Weight Throw	3rd place, bronze medalist(s)	Tserendolgor Tumurbat	Mongolia	10.35m
W80 Weight Throw
W80 Weight Throw	1st place, gold medalist(s)	Eila Mikola	Finland	10.40m
W80 Weight Throw	2nd place, silver medalist(s)	Asta Satsi	Estonia	9.91m
W80 Weight Throw	3rd place, bronze medalist(s)	Galina Kovalenskaya	Russia	9.63m
W85 Weight Throw
W85 Weight Throw	1st place, gold medalist(s)	Rachel Hanssens	Belgium	8.89m
W85 Weight Throw	2nd place, silver medalist(s)	Hilja Bakhoff	Estonia	8.75m
W85 Weight Throw	3rd place, bronze medalist(s)	Marcia Petley	New Zealand	6.86m
W90 Weight Throw
W90 Weight Throw	1st place, gold medalist(s)	Nora Kutti	Estonia	7.03m
M35 Weight Throw
M35 Weight Throw	1st place, gold medalist(s)	Juhana Makela	Finland	18.45m
M35 Weight Throw	2nd place, silver medalist(s)	Jason Baines	Canada	17.61m
M35 Weight Throw	3rd place, bronze medalist(s)	Gregory Bottier	France	14.15m
M40 Weight Throw
M40 Weight Throw	1st place, gold medalist(s)	Mariusz Walczak	Poland	19.25m
M40 Weight Throw	2nd place, silver medalist(s)	Tero Mäkelä	Finland	17.16m
M40 Weight Throw	3rd place, bronze medalist(s)	Jarkko Karstila	Finland	15.20m
M45 Weight Throw
M45 Weight Throw	1st place, gold medalist(s)	Laurent Bettolo	France	16.78m
M45 Weight Throw	2nd place, silver medalist(s)	Adrian Marzo	Argentina	15.98m
M45 Weight Throw	3rd place, bronze medalist(s)	Mark Wiseman	Great Britain	15.12m
M50 Weight Throw
M50 Weight Throw	1st place, gold medalist(s)	Rimvydas Medisauskas	Lithuania	19.40m
M50 Weight Throw	2nd place, silver medalist(s)	Lech Kowalski	Poland	19.40m
M50 Weight Throw	3rd place, bronze medalist(s)	Gudmundur Karlsson	Iceland	19.10m
M55 Weight Throw
M55 Weight Throw	1st place, gold medalist(s)	Tom Jensen	Denmark	18.53m
M55 Weight Throw	2nd place, silver medalist(s)	Hartmut Nuschke	Germany	17.56m
M55 Weight Throw	3rd place, bronze medalist(s)	Sergrei Vasenko	Russia	17.41m
M60 Weight Throw
M60 Weight Throw	1st place, gold medalist(s)	John Goldhammer	United States	20.26m
M60 Weight Throw	2nd place, silver medalist(s)	Vasileios Manganas	Greece	19.10m
M60 Weight Throw	3rd place, bronze medalist(s)	Heikki Kangas	Finland	18.18m
M65 Weight Throw
M65 Weight Throw	1st place, gold medalist(s)	Arlid Busterud	Norway	22.10m
M65 Weight Throw	2nd place, silver medalist(s)	Andrzej Piaczkowski	Poland	18.21m
M65 Weight Throw	3rd place, bronze medalist(s)	Kenneth Jansson	Sweden	17.92m
M70 Weight Throw
M70 Weight Throw	1st place, gold medalist(s)	Gérard Guyot	France	19.74m
M70 Weight Throw	2nd place, silver medalist(s)	Heimo Viertbauer	Austria	19.47m
M70 Weight Throw	3rd place, bronze medalist(s)	George Mathews	United States	18.81m
M75 Weight Throw
M75 Weight Throw	1st place, gold medalist(s)	Hermann Albrecht	Germany	18.70m
M75 Weight Throw	2nd place, silver medalist(s)	Andrzej Rzepecki	South Africa	17.60m
M75 Weight Throw	3rd place, bronze medalist(s)	Gilbert Storq	France	15.22m
M80 Weight Throw
M80 Weight Throw	1st place, gold medalist(s)	Peter Speckens	Germany	18.50m
M80 Weight Throw	2nd place, silver medalist(s)	Lothar Huchthausen	Germany	16.33m
M80 Weight Throw	3rd place, bronze medalist(s)	Östen Edlund	Sweden	16.30m
M85 Weight Throw
M85 Weight Throw	1st place, gold medalist(s)	Leo Saarinen	Finland	11.74m
M85 Weight Throw	2nd place, silver medalist(s)	Richard Rzehak	Germany	11.14m
M85 Weight Throw	3rd place, bronze medalist(s)	Radomir Skoko	Serbia	9.46m
M90 Weight Throw
M90 Weight Throw	1st place, gold medalist(s)	Hugh Gallagher	Ireland	6.53m
M95 Weight Throw
M95 Weight Throw	1st place, gold medalist(s)	Valentin Huch	Spain	5.85m

=== Javelin Throw ===
Event	Pos	Athlete	Country	Result
W35 Javelin Throw
W35 Javelin Throw	1st place, gold medalist(s)	Dominique Bilodeau	Canada	39.34m
W35 Javelin Throw	2nd place, silver medalist(s)	Jindriška Noasová	Czech Republic	37.61m
W35 Javelin Throw	3rd place, bronze medalist(s)	Katja Hautaniemi	Finland	37.10m
W40 Javelin Throw
W40 Javelin Throw	1st place, gold medalist(s)	Geraldine George	Trinidad and Tobago	41.72m
W40 Javelin Throw	2nd place, silver medalist(s)	Birgit Keller	Germany	38.43m
W40 Javelin Throw	3rd place, bronze medalist(s)	Ulrike Friese	Germany	37.61m
W45 Javelin Throw
W45 Javelin Throw	1st place, gold medalist(s)	Dagmar Suhling	Germany	38.24m
W45 Javelin Throw	2nd place, silver medalist(s)	Ina Adam	Germany	35.42m
W45 Javelin Throw	3rd place, bronze medalist(s)	Mette Jepsen	Denmark	34.16m
W50 Javelin Throw
W50 Javelin Throw	1st place, gold medalist(s)	Genowefa Patla	Poland	47.14m WR
W50 Javelin Throw	2nd place, silver medalist(s)	Monika David	France	45.10m WR
W50 Javelin Throw	3rd place, bronze medalist(s)	Gwendolyn Smith	Trinidad and Tobago	44.38m
W55 Javelin Throw
W55 Javelin Throw	1st place, gold medalist(s)	Barbara Dabrowski	Canada	33.16m
W55 Javelin Throw	2nd place, silver medalist(s)	Wiebke Baseda	Germany	31.43m
W55 Javelin Throw	3rd place, bronze medalist(s)	Ans Saalberg	Netherlands	28.09m
W60 Javelin Throw
W60 Javelin Throw	1st place, gold medalist(s)	Linda Cohn	United States	34.11m
W60 Javelin Throw	2nd place, silver medalist(s)	Anne Kirstine Jensen	Denmark	30.89m
W60 Javelin Throw	3rd place, bronze medalist(s)	Anja Akkerman-Smits	Netherlands	28.91m
W65 Javelin Throw
W65 Javelin Throw	1st place, gold medalist(s)	Weia Reinboud	Netherlands	29.28m
W65 Javelin Throw	2nd place, silver medalist(s)	Jarmila Klimesova	Czech Republic	28.93m
W65 Javelin Throw	3rd place, bronze medalist(s)	Kristina Dr. Hanke	Germany	27.37m
W70 Javelin Throw
W70 Javelin Throw	1st place, gold medalist(s)	Carol Frost	United States	25.58m
W70 Javelin Throw	2nd place, silver medalist(s)	Mary Thomas	Australia	24.31m
W70 Javelin Throw	3rd place, bronze medalist(s)	Adelheid Graber-Bolliger	Switzerland	22.31m
W75 Javelin Throw
W75 Javelin Throw	1st place, gold medalist(s)	Tserendolgor Tumurbat	Mongolia	20.07m
W75 Javelin Throw	2nd place, silver medalist(s)	Miriam Cudmore	Australia	19.37m
W75 Javelin Throw	3rd place, bronze medalist(s)	Helvi Erikson	Estonia	16.68m
W80 Javelin Throw
W80 Javelin Throw	1st place, gold medalist(s)	Galina Kovalenskaya	Russia	16.68m
W80 Javelin Throw	2nd place, silver medalist(s)	Christa Winkelmann	Germany	14.02m
W80 Javelin Throw	3rd place, bronze medalist(s)	Christel Donley	United States	13.46m
W85 Javelin Throw
W85 Javelin Throw	1st place, gold medalist(s)	Rosa Pedersen	Denmark	16.89m
W85 Javelin Throw	2nd place, silver medalist(s)	Rachel Hanssens	Belgium	16.56m
W85 Javelin Throw	3rd place, bronze medalist(s)	Toshi Kawakami	Brazil	8.25m
W90 Javelin Throw
W90 Javelin Throw	1st place, gold medalist(s)	Nora Kutti	Estonia	12.08m
M35 Javelin Throw
M35 Javelin Throw	1st place, gold medalist(s)	Tero Savolainen	Finland	68.34m
M35 Javelin Throw	2nd place, silver medalist(s)	Julien Gourdier	France	63.67m
M35 Javelin Throw	3rd place, bronze medalist(s)	Dominik Lewin	Germany	57.26m
M40 Javelin Throw
M40 Javelin Throw	1st place, gold medalist(s)	Ēriks Rags	Latvia	70.17m
M40 Javelin Throw	2nd place, silver medalist(s)	Danilo Fresnido	Philippines	64.86m
M40 Javelin Throw	3rd place, bronze medalist(s)	Lubos Novacek	Czech Republic	64.07m
M45 Javelin Throw
M45 Javelin Throw	1st place, gold medalist(s)	Raymond Hecht	France	60.70m
M45 Javelin Throw	2nd place, silver medalist(s)	Stefan Petersson	United States	58.35m
M45 Javelin Throw	3rd place, bronze medalist(s)	Robert Teršek	Slovenia	57.61m
M50 Javelin Throw
M50 Javelin Throw	1st place, gold medalist(s)	Torsten Heinrich	Germany	61.67m
M50 Javelin Throw	2nd place, silver medalist(s)	Timo Tikka	Finland	58.61m
M50 Javelin Throw	3rd place, bronze medalist(s)	Trevor Ratcliffe	Great Britain	58.57m
M55 Javelin Throw
M55 Javelin Throw	1st place, gold medalist(s)	Serhiy Havras	Ukraine	58.74m
M55 Javelin Throw	2nd place, silver medalist(s)	Luis Nogueira	Spain	56.61m
M55 Javelin Throw	3rd place, bronze medalist(s)	Dainis Kula	Latvia	54.01m
M60 Javelin Throw
M60 Javelin Throw	1st place, gold medalist(s)	Josef Schaffarzik	Germany	53.21m
M60 Javelin Throw	2nd place, silver medalist(s)	Teuvo Kemppainen	Finland	51.51m
M60 Javelin Throw	3rd place, bronze medalist(s)	Walter Kühndel	Germany	51.46m
M65 Javelin Throw
M65 Javelin Throw	1st place, gold medalist(s)	Esa Kiuru	Finland	50.95m
M65 Javelin Throw	2nd place, silver medalist(s)	Edward Hearn	United States	46.33m
M65 Javelin Throw	3rd place, bronze medalist(s)	Pat Moore	Ireland	43.75m
M70 Javelin Throw
M70 Javelin Throw	1st place, gold medalist(s)	Anatoly Kosikov	Russia	42.22m
M70 Javelin Throw	2nd place, silver medalist(s)	Norbert Röhrle	Germany	40.53m
M70 Javelin Throw	3rd place, bronze medalist(s)	Ewald Jordan	Germany	39.43m
M75 Javelin Throw
M75 Javelin Throw	1st place, gold medalist(s)	Jouni Tenhu	Finland	45.24m
M75 Javelin Throw	2nd place, silver medalist(s)	Kalevi Honkanen	Finland	40.30m
M75 Javelin Throw	3rd place, bronze medalist(s)	Eero Järvenpää	Finland	35.07m
M80 Javelin Throw
M80 Javelin Throw	1st place, gold medalist(s)	Lothar Huchthausen	Germany	41.09m
M80 Javelin Throw	2nd place, silver medalist(s)	Takumi Matsushima	Brazil	36.00m
M80 Javelin Throw	3rd place, bronze medalist(s)	Manfred Kern	Germany	33.71m
M85 Javelin Throw
M85 Javelin Throw	1st place, gold medalist(s)	Pavel Jilek	Czech Republic	23.09m
M85 Javelin Throw	2nd place, silver medalist(s)	Viljo Hyvölä	Finland	21.54m
M90 Javelin Throw
M90 Javelin Throw	1st place, gold medalist(s)	Mamoru Ussami	Brazil	13.75m
M90 Javelin Throw	2nd place, silver medalist(s)	Hugh Gallagher	Ireland	13.17m
M90 Javelin Throw	3rd place, bronze medalist(s)	Axel Magnusson	Sweden	11.59m
M95 Javelin Throw
M95 Javelin Throw	1st place, gold medalist(s)	Emmerich Zensch	Austria	13.99m
M95 Javelin Throw	2nd place, silver medalist(s)	Frederico Fischer	Brazil	10.61m

=== Decathlon ===
Event	Pos	Athlete	Country	Result
M35 Decathlon
M35 Decathlon	1st place, gold medalist(s)	Branislav Puvak	Slovakia	6594
M35 Decathlon	2nd place, silver medalist(s)	Justin Francois	Netherlands	6555
M35 Decathlon	3rd place, bronze medalist(s)	Damien Camberlein	France	6500
M40 Decathlon
M40 Decathlon	1st place, gold medalist(s)	David Lasne	France	7118
M40 Decathlon	2nd place, silver medalist(s)	Michael Hoffer	Sweden	6881
M40 Decathlon	3rd place, bronze medalist(s)	Mikko Huttunen	Finland	6497
M45 Decathlon
M45 Decathlon	1st place, gold medalist(s)	Justin Hanrahan	Australia	7111
M45 Decathlon	2nd place, silver medalist(s)	Christopher Schiefermayer	Austria	7039
M45 Decathlon	3rd place, bronze medalist(s)	Stephan Andres	Germany	6827
M50 Decathlon
M50 Decathlon	1st place, gold medalist(s)	Jean Luc Duez	France	7864
M50 Decathlon	2nd place, silver medalist(s)	Brian Coushay	United States	7101
M50 Decathlon	3rd place, bronze medalist(s)	Masahiro Ikeno	Japan	7061
M55 Decathlon
M55 Decathlon	1st place, gold medalist(s)	Allan Leiper	Great Britain	7220
M55 Decathlon	2nd place, silver medalist(s)	Timo Rajamaki	Finland	6982
M55 Decathlon	3rd place, bronze medalist(s)	Michael Janusey	United States	6861
M60 Decathlon
M60 Decathlon	1st place, gold medalist(s)	Roland Hepperle	Germany	7263
M60 Decathlon	2nd place, silver medalist(s)	Marek Grzyb	Poland	6969
M60 Decathlon	3rd place, bronze medalist(s)	Ivo Strnad	Czech Republic	6617
M65 Decathlon
M65 Decathlon	1st place, gold medalist(s)	Valdis Cela	Latvia	7010
M65 Decathlon	2nd place, silver medalist(s)	Lasse Kyrö	Finland	6121
M65 Decathlon	3rd place, bronze medalist(s)	Vesa Maki	Finland	6084
M70 Decathlon
M70 Decathlon	1st place, gold medalist(s)	Aleksandr Abramov	Russia	6749
M70 Decathlon	2nd place, silver medalist(s)	Robert Baker	United States	5957
M70 Decathlon	3rd place, bronze medalist(s)	Albert Gay	Australia	5733
M75 Decathlon
M75 Decathlon	1st place, gold medalist(s)	Clifford Bernard Cordy Jr	Colombia	7020
M75 Decathlon	2nd place, silver medalist(s)	Willi Klaus	Germany	6725
M75 Decathlon	3rd place, bronze medalist(s)	Kjartan Sølvberg	Norway	6619
M80 Decathlon
M80 Decathlon	1st place, gold medalist(s)	Lars Wennblom	Sweden	7012
M80 Decathlon	2nd place, silver medalist(s)	Nobuo Ishikawa	Japan	6419
M80 Decathlon	3rd place, bronze medalist(s)	Raúl López Barrera	Uruguay	5571
M85 Decathlon
M85 Decathlon	1st place, gold medalist(s)	Pengxue Su	China	3482

=== Heptathlon ===
Event	Pos	Athlete	Country	Result
W35 Heptathlon
W35 Heptathlon	1st place, gold medalist(s)	Maren Schott	Germany	4859
W35 Heptathlon	2nd place, silver medalist(s)	Jennifer Schmelter	Germany	4466
W35 Heptathlon	3rd place, bronze medalist(s)	Karin Straub	Germany	4463
W40 Heptathlon
W40 Heptathlon	1st place, gold medalist(s)	Marsha Mark-Baird	Trinidad and Tobago	5805
W40 Heptathlon	2nd place, silver medalist(s)	Rachel Guest	United States	5468
W40 Heptathlon	3rd place, bronze medalist(s)	Roberta Sara Colombo	Italy	4763
W45 Heptathlon
W45 Heptathlon	1st place, gold medalist(s)	Monique Krefting	Great Britain	5733
W45 Heptathlon	2nd place, silver medalist(s)	Petra Bajeat	France	5561
W45 Heptathlon	3rd place, bronze medalist(s)	Lenore Lambert	Australia	5089
W50 Heptathlon
W50 Heptathlon	1st place, gold medalist(s)	Barbara Gähling	Germany	6456 WR
W50 Heptathlon	2nd place, silver medalist(s)	Angela Mueller	Germany	4952
W50 Heptathlon	3rd place, bronze medalist(s)	Romana Schulz	Germany	4821
W55 Heptathlon
W55 Heptathlon	1st place, gold medalist(s)	Marie Kay	Australia	6682 WR
W55 Heptathlon	2nd place, silver medalist(s)	Wiebke Baseda	Germany	5404
W55 Heptathlon	3rd place, bronze medalist(s)	Susan Frisby	Great Britain	5326
W60 Heptathlon
W60 Heptathlon	1st place, gold medalist(s)	Rita Hanscom	United States	5989
W60 Heptathlon	2nd place, silver medalist(s)	Anja Akkerman-Smits	Netherlands	5855
W60 Heptathlon	3rd place, bronze medalist(s)	Ulrike Hiltscher	Germany	5567
W65 Heptathlon
W65 Heptathlon	1st place, gold medalist(s)	Wilma Perkins	Australia	5415
W65 Heptathlon	2nd place, silver medalist(s)	Ingeborg Zorzi	Italy	4936
W65 Heptathlon	3rd place, bronze medalist(s)	Terhi Kokkonen	Finland	4911
W70 Heptathlon
W70 Heptathlon	1st place, gold medalist(s)	Marianne Maier	Austria	6034
W70 Heptathlon	2nd place, silver medalist(s)	Jean Hampson	Australia	4732
W70 Heptathlon	3rd place, bronze medalist(s)	Jacqueline Wladika	Austria	4161
W75 Heptathlon
W75 Heptathlon	1st place, gold medalist(s)	Brita Kiesheyer	Germany	3362
W80 Heptathlon
W80 Heptathlon	1st place, gold medalist(s)	Florence Meiler	United States	5730
W80 Heptathlon	2nd place, silver medalist(s)	Christel Donley	United States	5135

=== Throws Pentathlon ===
Event	Pos	Athlete	Country	Result
W35 Throws Pentathlon	1st place, gold medalist(s)	Marie-Josée Le Jour	Canada	4114 WR
M50 Throws Pentathlon
M50 Throws Pentathlon	1st place, gold medalist(s)	Norbert Demmel	Germany	2599
M50 Throws Pentathlon	2nd place, silver medalist(s)	Stephen Whyte	Great Britain	2584
M50 Throws Pentathlon	3rd place, bronze medalist(s)	Marek Stolarczyk	Poland	2497
M60 Throws Pentathlon
M60 Throws Pentathlon	1st place, gold medalist(s)	John Goldhammer	United States	4596
M60 Throws Pentathlon	2nd place, silver medalist(s)	Anatolii Vlasov	Ukraine	3978
M60 Throws Pentathlon	3rd place, bronze medalist(s)	Lembit Talpsepp	Estonia	3949
M65 Throws Pentathlon
M65 Throws Pentathlon	1st place, gold medalist(s)	Arlid Busterud	Norway	5043
M65 Throws Pentathlon	2nd place, silver medalist(s)	Kjell Adamski	Norway	4362
M65 Throws Pentathlon	3rd place, bronze medalist(s)	Kenneth Jansson	Sweden	4361

=== 5000 Meters Race Walk ===
Event	Pos	Athlete	Country	Result
W35 5K Race Walk
W35 5K Race Walk	1st place, gold medalist(s)	Maria Dolores Marcos Valero	Spain	24:35.34
W35 5K Race Walk	2nd place, silver medalist(s)	Andrea Kovács	Austria	25:24.11
W35 5K Race Walk	3rd place, bronze medalist(s)	Sandra Silva	Portugal	25:38.44
W40 5K Race Walk
W40 5K Race Walk	1st place, gold medalist(s)	Bianca Schenker	Germany	25:07.08
W40 5K Race Walk	2nd place, silver medalist(s)	Caroline Guillard	France	25:08.69
W40 5K Race Walk	3rd place, bronze medalist(s)	Hongmiao Gao	China	25:30.35
W45 5K Race Walk
W45 5K Race Walk	1st place, gold medalist(s)	Elena Cinca	Italy	27:05.92
W45 5K Race Walk	2nd place, silver medalist(s)	Corinne Smith	New Zealand	27:16.87
W45 5K Race Walk	3rd place, bronze medalist(s)	Valérie Boban	France	27:25.43
W50 5K Race Walk
W50 5K Race Walk	1st place, gold medalist(s)	Lesley Van Buuren	South Africa	26:40.56
W50 5K Race Walk	2nd place, silver medalist(s)	Sylvie Sevellec	France	26:55.04
W50 5K Race Walk	3rd place, bronze medalist(s)	Peppina Demartis	Italy	28:04.89
W55 5K Race Walk
W55 5K Race Walk	1st place, gold medalist(s)	Lynette Ventris	Australia	26:18.19
W55 5K Race Walk	2nd place, silver medalist(s)	Marie Astrid Monmessin	France	27:01.69
W55 5K Race Walk	3rd place, bronze medalist(s)	Francoise Laville	France	28:44.00
W60 5K Race Walk
W60 5K Race Walk	1st place, gold medalist(s)	Janine Vignat	France	28:03.52
W60 5K Race Walk	2nd place, silver medalist(s)	Johanna Flipsen	Canada	28:09.21
W60 5K Race Walk	3rd place, bronze medalist(s)	Barbara Nell	South Africa	28:25.13
W65 5K Race Walk
W65 5K Race Walk	1st place, gold medalist(s)	Heather Carr	Australia	29:28.21
W65 5K Race Walk	2nd place, silver medalist(s)	Marianne Martino	United States	30:30.64
W65 5K Race Walk	3rd place, bronze medalist(s)	Winnie Koekemoer	South Africa	30:31.89
W70 5K Race Walk
W70 5K Race Walk	1st place, gold medalist(s)	Heidi Maeder	Switzerland	31:55.05
W70 5K Race Walk	2nd place, silver medalist(s)	Ursula Klink	Germany	34:43.94
W70 5K Race Walk	3rd place, bronze medalist(s)	Joan Purcell	Australia	37:13.83
W75 5K Race Walk
W75 5K Race Walk	1st place, gold medalist(s)	Helga Dräger	Germany	37:48.84
W75 5K Race Walk	2nd place, silver medalist(s)	Ana Maria Ortiz Trapala	Mexico	40:13.55
W75 5K Race Walk	3rd place, bronze medalist(s)	Ilga Buntika	Latvia	40:24.76
W80 5K Race Walk
W80 5K Race Walk	1st place, gold medalist(s)	Jean Horne	Canada	40:17.35
W80 5K Race Walk	2nd place, silver medalist(s)	Denise Leclerc	France	41:16.92
W80 5K Race Walk	3rd place, bronze medalist(s)	Erna Antritter	Germany	44:36.13
W85 5K Race Walk
W85 5K Race Walk	1st place, gold medalist(s)	Lorna Lauchlan	Australia	41:53.65
W85 5K Race Walk	2nd place, silver medalist(s)	Elena Pagu	Romania	45:18.62
M35 5K Race Walk
M35 5K Race Walk	1st place, gold medalist(s)	Manuel Da Silva Correia	Portugal	22:44.12
M35 5K Race Walk	2nd place, silver medalist(s)	Stephane Poirout	France	23:08.16
M35 5K Race Walk	3rd place, bronze medalist(s)	Rodrigo Domínguez	Spain	23:23.97
M40 5K Race Walk
M40 5K Race Walk	1st place, gold medalist(s)	Steffen Borsch	Germany	21:41.72
M40 5K Race Walk	2nd place, silver medalist(s)	Grégory Leclercq	France	21:43.62
M40 5K Race Walk	3rd place, bronze medalist(s)	Sebastien Delaunay	France	21:54.55
M45 5K Race Walk
M45 5K Race Walk	1st place, gold medalist(s)	Leonardo Toro Lopez	Spain	22:59.84
M45 5K Race Walk	2nd place, silver medalist(s)	Fabrice Ramon	France	23:51.55
M45 5K Race Walk	3rd place, bronze medalist(s)	Stuart Kollmorgen	Australia	24:21.61
M50 5K Race Walk
M50 5K Race Walk	1st place, gold medalist(s)	Miguel Periañez	Spain	22:47.64
M50 5K Race Walk	2nd place, silver medalist(s)	Adolfo Garcia Marin	Spain	23:20.00
M50 5K Race Walk	3rd place, bronze medalist(s)	David Swarts	United States	23:57.40
M55 5K Race Walk
M55 5K Race Walk	1st place, gold medalist(s)	Sergey Systerov	Russia	25:18.23
M55 5K Race Walk	2nd place, silver medalist(s)	Dave Talcott	United States	25:33.56
M55 5K Race Walk	3rd place, bronze medalist(s)	Mark Donahoo	Australia	26:00.82
M60 5K Race Walk
M60 5K Race Walk	1st place, gold medalist(s)	Patrice Brochot	France	24:40.79
M60 5K Race Walk	2nd place, silver medalist(s)	Ignacio Melo	Spain	25:03.02
M60 5K Race Walk	3rd place, bronze medalist(s)	Dominique Guebey	France	25:20.23
M65 5K Race Walk
M65 5K Race Walk	1st place, gold medalist(s)	Ian Richards	Great Britain	25:03.76
M65 5K Race Walk	2nd place, silver medalist(s)	Jose Luis Lopez Camarena	Mexico	25:17.82
M65 5K Race Walk	3rd place, bronze medalist(s)	Ettorino Formentin	Italy	27:17.13
M70 5K Race Walk
M70 5K Race Walk	1st place, gold medalist(s)	Colin Turner	Great Britain	28:45.79
M70 5K Race Walk	2nd place, silver medalist(s)	George White	Australia	29:03.06
M70 5K Race Walk	3rd place, bronze medalist(s)	Ralph Bennett	Australia	29:21.00
M75 5K Race Walk
M75 5K Race Walk	1st place, gold medalist(s)	Ants Palmar	Estonia	29:52.05
M75 5K Race Walk	2nd place, silver medalist(s)	Vladimir Kansky	Czech Republic	30:30.77
M75 5K Race Walk	3rd place, bronze medalist(s)	Romolo Pelliccia	Italy	30:41.46
M80 5K Race Walk
M80 5K Race Walk	1st place, gold medalist(s)	Mykola Panaseiko	Ukraine	33:30.08
M80 5K Race Walk	2nd place, silver medalist(s)	Vincenzo Menafro	Italy	34:33.18
M80 5K Race Walk	3rd place, bronze medalist(s)	Norbert Will	Great Britain	34:45.16
M85 5K Race Walk
M85 5K Race Walk	1st place, gold medalist(s)	Ivan Pushkin	Ukraine	36:52.70
M85 5K Race Walk	2nd place, silver medalist(s)	William Moremen	United States	37:20.85
M85 5K Race Walk	3rd place, bronze medalist(s)	Viljo Hyvölä	Finland	39:11.66
M90 5K Race Walk
M90 5K Race Walk	1st place, gold medalist(s)	Gerhard Herbst	Germany	46:38.73

=== 10000 Meters Race Walk ===
Event	Pos	Athlete	Country	Result
W35 10K Race Walk
W35 10K Race Walk	1st place, gold medalist(s)	Maria Dolores Marcos Valero	Spain	49:20.00
W35 10K Race Walk	2nd place, silver medalist(s)	Sandra Silva	Portugal	50:25.00
W35 10K Race Walk	3rd place, bronze medalist(s)	Erin Taylor-Talcott	United States	52:03.00
W40 10K Race Walk
W40 10K Race Walk	1st place, gold medalist(s)	Bianca Schenker	Germany	50:26.00
W40 10K Race Walk	2nd place, silver medalist(s)	Caroline Guillard	France	50:46.00
W40 10K Race Walk	3rd place, bronze medalist(s)	Alexandra Lamas	Portugal	52:01.00
W45 10K Race Walk
W45 10K Race Walk	1st place, gold medalist(s)	Corinne Smith	New Zealand	54:23.00
W45 10K Race Walk	2nd place, silver medalist(s)	Valérie Boban	France	55:18.00
W45 10K Race Walk	3rd place, bronze medalist(s)	Katie Donaldson	Great Britain	55:47.00
W50 10K Race Walk
W50 10K Race Walk	1st place, gold medalist(s)	Lesley Van Buuren	South Africa	54:12.00
W50 10K Race Walk	2nd place, silver medalist(s)	Annick Le Mouroux	France	54:37.00
W50 10K Race Walk	3rd place, bronze medalist(s)	Sylvie Sevellec	France	54:59.00
W55 10K Race Walk
W55 10K Race Walk	1st place, gold medalist(s)	Lynette Ventris	Australia	53:27.00
W55 10K Race Walk	2nd place, silver medalist(s)	Marie Astrid Monmessin	France	54:22.00
W55 10K Race Walk	3rd place, bronze medalist(s)	Daniela Ricciutelli	Italy	58:11.00
W60 10K Race Walk
W60 10K Race Walk	1st place, gold medalist(s)	Janine Vignat	France	57:09.00
W60 10K Race Walk	2nd place, silver medalist(s)	Johanna Flipsen	Canada	57:13.00
W60 10K Race Walk	3rd place, bronze medalist(s)	Barbara Nell	South Africa	57:18.00
W65 10K Race Walk
W65 10K Race Walk	1st place, gold medalist(s)	Heather Carr	Australia	1:00:02.00
W65 10K Race Walk	2nd place, silver medalist(s)	Marianne Martino	United States	1:00:59.00
W65 10K Race Walk	3rd place, bronze medalist(s)	Winnie Koekemoer	South Africa	1:02:36.00
W70 10K Race Walk
W70 10K Race Walk	1st place, gold medalist(s)	Heidi Maeder	Switzerland	1:05:42.00
W70 10K Race Walk	2nd place, silver medalist(s)	Ursula Klink	Germany	1:09:58.00
W70 10K Race Walk	3rd place, bronze medalist(s)	Joan Purcell	Australia	1:13:31.00
W75 10K Race Walk
W75 10K Race Walk	1st place, gold medalist(s)	Helga Dräger	Germany	1:16:35.00
W75 10K Race Walk	2nd place, silver medalist(s)	Rita Sinkovec	United States	1:17:13.00
W75 10K Race Walk	3rd place, bronze medalist(s)	Lyusya Aleksyeyeva	Ukraine	1:17:33.00
W80 10K Race Walk
W80 10K Race Walk	1st place, gold medalist(s)	Jean Horne	Canada	1:18:38.00
W80 10K Race Walk	2nd place, silver medalist(s)	Denise Leclerc	France	1:20:38.00
W80 10K Race Walk	3rd place, bronze medalist(s)	Erna Antritter	Germany	1:27:35.00
W85 10K Race Walk
W85 10K Race Walk	1st place, gold medalist(s)	Lorna Lauchlan	Australia	1:25:50.00
M35 10K Race Walk
M35 10K Race Walk	1st place, gold medalist(s)	Manuel Da Silva Correia	Portugal	45:38.00
M35 10K Race Walk	2nd place, silver medalist(s)	Stephane Poirout	France	45:50.00
M35 10K Race Walk	3rd place, bronze medalist(s)	Rodrigo Domínguez	Spain	46:00.00
M40 10K Race Walk
M40 10K Race Walk	1st place, gold medalist(s)	Steffen Borsch	Germany	44:59.00
M40 10K Race Walk	2nd place, silver medalist(s)	Normunds Ivzans	Latvia	45:17.00
M40 10K Race Walk	3rd place, bronze medalist(s)	Sebastien Delaunay	France	45:23.00
M45 10K Race Walk
M45 10K Race Walk	1st place, gold medalist(s)	Fabrice Ramon	France	46:38.00
M45 10K Race Walk	2nd place, silver medalist(s)	Leonardo Toro Lopez	Spain	47:21.00
M45 10K Race Walk	3rd place, bronze medalist(s)	Steffen Meyer	Germany	48:55.00
M50 10K Race Walk
M50 10K Race Walk	1st place, gold medalist(s)	Philippe Bonneau	France	46:58.00
M50 10K Race Walk	2nd place, silver medalist(s)	Miguel Periañez	Spain	47:07.00
M50 10K Race Walk	3rd place, bronze medalist(s)	David Swarts	United States	48:34.00
M55 10K Race Walk
M55 10K Race Walk	1st place, gold medalist(s)	Sergey Systerov	Russia	51:15.00
M55 10K Race Walk	2nd place, silver medalist(s)	Mark Donahoo	Australia	52:01.00
M55 10K Race Walk	3rd place, bronze medalist(s)	Dave Talcott	United States	52:35.00
M60 10K Race Walk
M60 10K Race Walk	1st place, gold medalist(s)	Patrice Brochot	France	50:08.00
M60 10K Race Walk	2nd place, silver medalist(s)	Ignacio Melo	Spain	50:24.00
M60 10K Race Walk	3rd place, bronze medalist(s)	Dominique Guebey	France	51:11.00
M65 10K Race Walk
M65 10K Race Walk	1st place, gold medalist(s)	Jose Luis Lopez Camarena	Mexico	51:47.00
M65 10K Race Walk	2nd place, silver medalist(s)	Andrew Jamieson	Australia	52:35.00
M65 10K Race Walk	3rd place, bronze medalist(s)	Ettorino Formentin	Italy	53:00.00
M70 10K Race Walk
M70 10K Race Walk	1st place, gold medalist(s)	George White	Australia	59:16.00
M70 10K Race Walk	2nd place, silver medalist(s)	Ralph Bennett	Australia	59:54.00
M70 10K Race Walk	3rd place, bronze medalist(s)	Peter Schumm	Germany	1:01:51.00
M75 10K Race Walk
M75 10K Race Walk	1st place, gold medalist(s)	Ants Palmar	Estonia	1:01:09.00
M75 10K Race Walk	2nd place, silver medalist(s)	Romolo Pelliccia	Italy	1:01:18.00
M75 10K Race Walk	3rd place, bronze medalist(s)	Vladimir Kansky	Czech Republic	1:01:32.00
M80 10K Race Walk
M80 10K Race Walk	1st place, gold medalist(s)	Mykola Panaseiko	Ukraine	1:08:46.00
M80 10K Race Walk	2nd place, silver medalist(s)	Vincenzo Menafro	Italy	1:10:45.00
M80 10K Race Walk	3rd place, bronze medalist(s)	Norbert Will	Great Britain	1:11:19.00
M85 10K Race Walk
M85 10K Race Walk	1st place, gold medalist(s)	Ivan Pushkin	Ukraine	1:13:52.00 WR
M85 10K Race Walk	2nd place, silver medalist(s)	Viljo Hyvölä	Finland	1:17:13.00
M85 10K Race Walk	3rd place, bronze medalist(s)	William Moremen	United States	1:18:06.00
M90 10K Race Walk
M90 10K Race Walk	1st place, gold medalist(s)	Sriramulu Vallabhajosyula	India	1:36:05.00

=== 20000 Meters Race Walk ===
Event	Pos	Athlete	Country	Result
W35 20K Race Walk
W35 20K Race Walk	1st place, gold medalist(s)	Maria Dolores Marcos Valero	Spain	1:44:49.00
W35 20K Race Walk	2nd place, silver medalist(s)	Sandra Silva	Portugal	1:46:20.00
W35 20K Race Walk	3rd place, bronze medalist(s)	Andrea Kovács	Austria	1:50:47.00
W40 20K Race Walk
W40 20K Race Walk	1st place, gold medalist(s)	Caroline Guillard	France	1:47:45.00
W40 20K Race Walk	2nd place, silver medalist(s)	Christèle Jouan	France	1:49:27.00
W40 20K Race Walk	3rd place, bronze medalist(s)	Alexandra Lamas	Portugal	1:50:07.00
W45 20K Race Walk
W45 20K Race Walk	1st place, gold medalist(s)	Corinne Smith	New Zealand	1:53:17.00
W45 20K Race Walk	2nd place, silver medalist(s)	Valérie Boban	France	1:55:34.00
W45 20K Race Walk	3rd place, bronze medalist(s)	Carmen Martin Piñuela	Spain	1:59:30.00
W50 20K Race Walk
W50 20K Race Walk	1st place, gold medalist(s)	Lesley Van Buuren	South Africa	1:51:14.00
W50 20K Race Walk	2nd place, silver medalist(s)	Annick Le Mouroux	France	1:52:51.00
W50 20K Race Walk	3rd place, bronze medalist(s)	Irina Kokorina	Russia	1:56:48.00
W55 20K Race Walk
W55 20K Race Walk	1st place, gold medalist(s)	Lynette Ventris	Australia	1:53:56.00
W55 20K Race Walk	2nd place, silver medalist(s)	Francoise Laville	France	1:58:44.00
W55 20K Race Walk	3rd place, bronze medalist(s)	Daniela Ricciutelli	Italy	2:04:27.00
W60 20K Race Walk
W60 20K Race Walk	1st place, gold medalist(s)	Johanna Flipsen	Canada	1:59:37.00
W60 20K Race Walk	2nd place, silver medalist(s)	Barb Bryant	Australia	2:02:28.00
W60 20K Race Walk	3rd place, bronze medalist(s)	Isabelle Repussard	France	2:04:44.00
W65 20K Race Walk
W65 20K Race Walk	1st place, gold medalist(s)	Heather Carr	Australia	2:06:09.00
W65 20K Race Walk	2nd place, silver medalist(s)	Marianne Martino	United States	2:07:40.00
W65 20K Race Walk	3rd place, bronze medalist(s)	Winnie Koekemoer	South Africa	2:09:02.00
W70 20K Race Walk
W70 20K Race Walk	1st place, gold medalist(s)	Heidi Maeder	Switzerland	2:14:49.00
W70 20K Race Walk	2nd place, silver medalist(s)	Ursula Klink	Germany	2:20:28.00
W70 20K Race Walk	3rd place, bronze medalist(s)	Joan Purcell	Australia	2:31:24.00
W75 20K Race Walk
W75 20K Race Walk	1st place, gold medalist(s)	Helga Dräger	Germany	2:40:51.00
M35 20K Race Walk
M35 20K Race Walk	1st place, gold medalist(s)	Edison Pumacuro	Italy	1:40:14.00
M35 20K Race Walk	2nd place, silver medalist(s)	Stephane Poirout	France	1:40:28.00
M35 20K Race Walk	3rd place, bronze medalist(s)	Manuel Da Silva Correia	Portugal	1:40:44.00
M40 20K Race Walk
M40 20K Race Walk	1st place, gold medalist(s)	Steffen Borsch	Germany	1:37:08.00
M40 20K Race Walk	2nd place, silver medalist(s)	Etiel Soto Maldonado	Mexico	1:37:10.00
M40 20K Race Walk	3rd place, bronze medalist(s)	Sebastien Delaunay	France	1:38:44.00
M45 20K Race Walk
M45 20K Race Walk	1st place, gold medalist(s)	Fabrice Ramon	France	1:42:30.00
M45 20K Race Walk	2nd place, silver medalist(s)	Steffen Meyer	Germany	1:46:20.00
M45 20K Race Walk	3rd place, bronze medalist(s)	Florent Nicolas	France	1:48:39.00
M50 20K Race Walk
M50 20K Race Walk	1st place, gold medalist(s)	Philippe Bonneau	France	1:43:40.00
M50 20K Race Walk	2nd place, silver medalist(s)	Sergio Gutierrez Brenes	Costa Rica	1:44:10.00
M50 20K Race Walk	3rd place, bronze medalist(s)	Anton Mashkevich	Belarus	1:45:59.00
M55 20K Race Walk
M55 20K Race Walk	1st place, gold medalist(s)	Uwe Schröter	Germany	1:47:22.00
M55 20K Race Walk	2nd place, silver medalist(s)	Miroslaw Luniewski	Poland	1:50:49.00
M55 20K Race Walk	3rd place, bronze medalist(s)	Gabriele Caldarelli	Italy	1:51:51.00
M60 20K Race Walk
M60 20K Race Walk	1st place, gold medalist(s)	Patrice Brochot	France	1:46:48.00
M60 20K Race Walk	2nd place, silver medalist(s)	Dominique Guebey	France	1:48:05.00
M60 20K Race Walk	3rd place, bronze medalist(s)	Colin Heywood	Australia	1:48:47.00
M65 20K Race Walk
M65 20K Race Walk	1st place, gold medalist(s)	Jose Luis Lopez Camarena	Mexico	1:53:21.00
M65 20K Race Walk	2nd place, silver medalist(s)	Ettorino Formentin	Italy	1:57:23.00
M65 20K Race Walk	3rd place, bronze medalist(s)	Fernand Rabatel	France	2:05:14.00
M70 20K Race Walk
M70 20K Race Walk	1st place, gold medalist(s)	George White	Australia	2:08:02.00
M70 20K Race Walk	2nd place, silver medalist(s)	Kenneth Bobbett	Great Britain	2:11:01.00
M70 20K Race Walk	3rd place, bronze medalist(s)	Goetz Klopfer	United States	2:11:31.00
M75 20K Race Walk
M75 20K Race Walk	1st place, gold medalist(s)	Ants Palmar	Estonia	2:09:42.00
M75 20K Race Walk	2nd place, silver medalist(s)	Vladimir Kansky	Czech Republic	2:14:07.00
M75 20K Race Walk	3rd place, bronze medalist(s)	Edmund Shillabeer	Great Britain	2:14:35.00
M80 20K Race Walk
M80 20K Race Walk	1st place, gold medalist(s)	Vincenzo Menafro	Italy	2:28:09.00
M80 20K Race Walk	2nd place, silver medalist(s)	Norbert Will	Great Britain	2:37:08.00
M80 20K Race Walk	3rd place, bronze medalist(s)	Carlos Acosta	United States	2:40:49.00
M85 20K Race Walk
M85 20K Race Walk	1st place, gold medalist(s)	Ivan Pushkin	Ukraine	2:34:49.00
M85 20K Race Walk	2nd place, silver medalist(s)	William Moremen	United States	2:51:15.00

=== 8000 Meters Cross Country ===
Event	Pos	Athlete	Country	Result
W35 8K Cross Country
W35 8K Cross Country	1st place, gold medalist(s)	Maria Jose De Toro Saiz	Spain	29:01.00
W35 8K Cross Country	2nd place, silver medalist(s)	Irene Reichl	Austria	29:27.00
W35 8K Cross Country	3rd place, bronze medalist(s)	Sophie Mazenc	France	30:01.00
W40 8K Cross Country
W40 8K Cross Country	1st place, gold medalist(s)	Florence Reignier	France	29:22.00
W40 8K Cross Country	2nd place, silver medalist(s)	Claudine Podvin	France	30:24.00
W40 8K Cross Country	3rd place, bronze medalist(s)	Maria Domenica Manchia	Italy	30:30.00
W45 8K Cross Country
W45 8K Cross Country	1st place, gold medalist(s)	Zohra Graziani	France	28:44.00
W45 8K Cross Country	2nd place, silver medalist(s)	Nathalie Loubele	Belgium	29:10.00
W45 8K Cross Country	3rd place, bronze medalist(s)	Carmel Crowley	Ireland	29:41.00
W50 8K Cross Country
W50 8K Cross Country	1st place, gold medalist(s)	Sally Gibbs	New Zealand	29:20.00
W50 8K Cross Country	2nd place, silver medalist(s)	Angela Carpini	Australia	30:12.00
W50 8K Cross Country	3rd place, bronze medalist(s)	Inara Luse	Latvia	30:43.00
W55 8K Cross Country
W55 8K Cross Country	1st place, gold medalist(s)	Carla Ophorst-Marrewijk	Netherlands	31:06.00
W55 8K Cross Country	2nd place, silver medalist(s)	Claire Donald	Great Britain	31:14.00
W55 8K Cross Country	3rd place, bronze medalist(s)	Carmen Ayala-Troncoso	United States	31:35.00
W60 8K Cross Country
W60 8K Cross Country	1st place, gold medalist(s)	Carmel Parnell Carmel	Ireland	32:10.00
W60 8K Cross Country	2nd place, silver medalist(s)	Anne Ryan	Australia	33:44.00
W60 8K Cross Country	3rd place, bronze medalist(s)	Lubov Pospeshina	Sweden	34:28.00
W65 8K Cross Country
W65 8K Cross Country	1st place, gold medalist(s)	Angela Copson	Great Britain	34:40.00
W65 8K Cross Country	2nd place, silver medalist(s)	Rosalind Tabor	Great Britain	35:38.00
W65 8K Cross Country	3rd place, bronze medalist(s)	Gudrun Vogl	Germany	37:04.00
W70 8K Cross Country
W70 8K Cross Country	1st place, gold medalist(s)	Lavinia Petrie	Australia	36:57.00
W70 8K Cross Country	2nd place, silver medalist(s)	Sieglinde Schmieder	Austria	39:14.00
W70 8K Cross Country	3rd place, bronze medalist(s)	Marisa Cruz	Brazil	41:40.00
W75 8K Cross Country
W75 8K Cross Country	1st place, gold medalist(s)	Joaquina Flores	Portugal	43:16.00
W75 8K Cross Country	2nd place, silver medalist(s)	Pamela Jones	Great Britain	47:55.00
W75 8K Cross Country	3rd place, bronze medalist(s)	Anne Martin	Great Britain	51:52.00
W80 8K Cross Country
W80 8K Cross Country	1st place, gold medalist(s)	Elfriede Hodapp	Germany	48:31.00
W80 8K Cross Country	2nd place, silver medalist(s)	Lynne Hurrell	United States	48:46.00
W80 8K Cross Country	3rd place, bronze medalist(s)	Margarida Stella Hochstatter	Brazil	55:16.00
M35 8K Cross Country
M35 8K Cross Country	1st place, gold medalist(s)	Mickael Moissonnier	France	25:17.00
M35 8K Cross Country	2nd place, silver medalist(s)	John Dunne	Ireland	25:21.00
M35 8K Cross Country	3rd place, bronze medalist(s)	Vladimir Srb	Czech Republic	25:39.00
M40 8K Cross Country
M40 8K Cross Country	1st place, gold medalist(s)	Jose Luis Blanco Quevedo	Spain	24:59.00
M40 8K Cross Country	2nd place, silver medalist(s)	Robert Celinski	Poland	25:19.00
M40 8K Cross Country	3rd place, bronze medalist(s)	Santiago De La Fuente	Spain	25:31.00
M45 8K Cross Country
M45 8K Cross Country	1st place, gold medalist(s)	Valerio Brignone	Italy	25:02.00
M45 8K Cross Country	2nd place, silver medalist(s)	César Javier Troncoso Troncoso	Argentina	25:16.00
M45 8K Cross Country	3rd place, bronze medalist(s)	Manuel Ferreira	Portugal	25:36.00
M50 8K Cross Country
M50 8K Cross Country	1st place, gold medalist(s)	Michael Traynor	Ireland	25:44.00
M50 8K Cross Country	2nd place, silver medalist(s)	Anders Dahl	Sweden	26:03.00
M50 8K Cross Country	3rd place, bronze medalist(s)	Bruce Graham	Australia	26:42.00
M55 8K Cross Country
M55 8K Cross Country	1st place, gold medalist(s)	Ihar Dolbik	Belarus	26:48.00
M55 8K Cross Country	2nd place, silver medalist(s)	Ahcene Alem	Algeria	27:10.00
M55 8K Cross Country	3rd place, bronze medalist(s)	Tore Axelsson	Sweden	27:23.00
M60 8K Cross Country
M60 8K Cross Country	1st place, gold medalist(s)	Francisco Aragon Muñoz	Spain	28:18.00
M60 8K Cross Country	2nd place, silver medalist(s)	Jose Del Carmen Ramirez Riaño	Colombia	28:28.00
M60 8K Cross Country	3rd place, bronze medalist(s)	Dominique Gilet	France	28:38.00
M65 8K Cross Country
M65 8K Cross Country	1st place, gold medalist(s)	Cees Stolwijk	Netherlands	29:53.00
M65 8K Cross Country	2nd place, silver medalist(s)	Delfor Aquino	Argentina	31:23.00
M65 8K Cross Country	3rd place, bronze medalist(s)	Stepan Lytkin	Russia	31:25.00
M70 8K Cross Country
M70 8K Cross Country	1st place, gold medalist(s)	Albert Anderegg	Switzerland	30:52.00
M70 8K Cross Country	2nd place, silver medalist(s)	Jim Langford	Australia	32:32.00
M70 8K Cross Country	3rd place, bronze medalist(s)	Georges Girard	France	33:07.00
M75 8K Cross Country
M75 8K Cross Country	1st place, gold medalist(s)	Karl Walter Trümper	Germany	35:03.00
M75 8K Cross Country	2nd place, silver medalist(s)	Jean-Louis Esnault	France	35:10.00
M75 8K Cross Country	3rd place, bronze medalist(s)	Fidel Diaz	Mexico	36:13.00
M80 8K Cross Country
M80 8K Cross Country	1st place, gold medalist(s)	Mykola Panaseiko	Ukraine	33:37.00
M80 8K Cross Country	2nd place, silver medalist(s)	Fernando Carvajal	Chile	36:32.00
M80 8K Cross Country	3rd place, bronze medalist(s)	Alfred Girault	Germany	36:55.00
M85 8K Cross Country
M85 8K Cross Country	1st place, gold medalist(s)	Christian Larcher	France	52:02.00
M85 8K Cross Country	2nd place, silver medalist(s)	Irwin Barrett-Lennard	Australia	53:11.00
M85 8K Cross Country	3rd place, bronze medalist(s)	Herbert E. Müller	Germany	58:50.00
M90 8K Cross Country
M90 8K Cross Country	1st place, gold medalist(s)	Lorenzo Juvenal Perez	Argentina	1:19:25.00

=== Half Marathon ===
Event	Pos	Athlete	Country	Result
W55 Half Marathon	1st place, gold medalist(s)	Silke Schmidt	Germany	1:20:06 WR
M65 Half Marathon	1st place, gold medalist(s)	Mario Vargas	Chile	1:21:07 WR
M70 Half Marathon	1st place, gold medalist(s)	Albert Anderegg	Switzerland	1:25:11 WR
