= Murder for Christmas =

Murder for Christmas may refer to:

- The U.S. publication title of Agatha Christie's Hercule Poirot's Christmas (1938)
- Murder for Christmas (1949) by Francis Duncan
