= 1988 World Junior Championships in Athletics – Women's long jump =

The women's long jump event at the 1988 World Junior Championships in Athletics was held in Sudbury, Ontario, Canada, at Laurentian University Stadium on 29 and 30 July.

== Medalists ==
Gold	Fiona May; United Kingdom
Silver	Anu Kaljurand; Soviet Union
Bronze	Joanne Wise; United Kingdom

== Results ==
=== Final ===
30 July

Rank	Name	Nationality	Attempts						Result	Notes
Rank	Name	Nationality	1	2	3	4	5	6	Result	Notes
1st place, gold medalist(s)	Fiona May	United Kingdom	6.77 (w: +1.2 m/s)	6.88 w (w: +2.1 m/s)	x	6.75 w (w: +2.4 m/s)	6.82 (w: +1.7 m/s)	6.83 w (w: +3.0 m/s)	6.88 w (w: +2.1 m/s)	
2nd place, silver medalist(s)	Anu Kaljurand	Soviet Union	6.78 w (w: +3.3 m/s)	x	6.41 w (w: +3.2 m/s)	x	6.37 (w: +1.8 m/s)	x	6.78 w (w: +3.3 m/s)	
3rd place, bronze medalist(s)	Joanne Wise	United Kingdom	6.47 (w: +1.7 m/s)	6.69 w (w: +4.6 m/s)	6.14 w (w: +3.7 m/s)	6.40 w (w: +2.1 m/s)	x	6.38 w (w: +3.7 m/s)	6.69 w (w: +4.6 m/s)	
4	Mirela Belu	Romania	6.26 w (w: +3.6 m/s)	x	x	6.37 w (w: +3.0 m/s)	6.28 w (w: +2.3 m/s)	6.06 w (w: +3.1 m/s)	6.37 w (w: +3.0 m/s)	
5	Wang Shu-Hua	Chinese Taipei	6.32 w (w: +3.8 m/s)	6.14 w (w: +2.2 m/s)	6.13 w (w: +3.2 m/s)	x	6.20 w (w: +2.7 m/s)	x	6.32 w (w: +3.8 m/s)	
6	Anisoara Ghebuta	Romania	6.18 w (w: +3.8 m/s)	6.26 w (w: +3.0 m/s)	6.19 w (w: +3.6 m/s)	6.18 w (w: +5.7 m/s)	x	5.62 (w: +1.1 m/s)	6.26 w (w: +3.0 m/s)	
7	Katalin Csapo	Hungary	6.03 (w: +1.3 m/s)	x	6.22 w (w: +3.8 m/s)	x	x	x	6.22 w (w: +3.8 m/s)	
8	Maria Costanza Moroni	Italy	6.09 w (w: +2.8 m/s)	x	x	5.93 w (w: +3.2 m/s)	5.85 w (w: +2.4 m/s)	6.13 (w: +1.8 m/s)	6.13 (w: +1.8 m/s)	
9	Simonetta Santoni	Italy	5.81 w (w: +2.9 m/s)	6.05 w (w: +2.1 m/s)	5.79 w (w: +3.1 m/s)				6.05 w (w: +2.1 m/s)	
10	Yuki Inoue	Japan	6.02 (w: +1.8 m/s)	3.80 w (w: +2.9 m/s)	x				6.02 (w: +1.8 m/s)	
11	Sharon Couch	United States	x	6.00 w (w: +2.9 m/s)	x				6.00 w (w: +2.9 m/s)	
12	Wang Wenhong	China	5.76 (w: +1.9 m/s)	5.83 w (w: +2.5 m/s)	5.81 w (w: +2.6 m/s)				5.83 w (w: +2.5 m/s)	

=== Qualifications ===
29 Jul

==== Group A ====
Rank	Name	Nationality	Attempts			Result	Notes
Rank	Name	Nationality	1	2	3	Result	Notes
1	Katalin Csapo	Hungary	6.17 (w: +1.9 m/s)	6.09 (w: +1.3 m/s)	x	6.17 (w: +1.9 m/s)	q
2	Maria Costanza Moroni	Italy	x	6.10 (w: +1.1 m/s)	x	6.10 (w: +1.1 m/s)	q
3	Anisoara Ghebuta	Romania	6.04 w (w: +2.5 m/s)	6.08 (w: +1.8 m/s)	6.08 w (w: +2.5 m/s)	6.08 (w: +1.8 m/s)	q
4	Joanne Wise	United Kingdom	x	x	6.04 w (w: +2.3 m/s)	6.04 w (w: +2.3 m/s)	q
5	Katrin Bartschat	West Germany	x	5.65 (w: +1.2 m/s)	5.96 (w: +0.9 m/s)	5.96 (w: +0.9 m/s)	
6	Súsanna Helgadóttir	Iceland	x	5.94 (w: +1.3 m/s)	5.66 (w: +1.2 m/s)	5.94 (w: +1.3 m/s)	
7	Dahlia Duhaney	Jamaica	5.57 (w: +0.9 m/s)	5.72 (w: +0.2 m/s)	5.93 (w: +1.4 m/s)	5.93 (w: +1.4 m/s)	
8	Yvonne Mathesius	East Germany	x	x	5.92 (w: +2.0 m/s)	5.92 (w: +2.0 m/s)	
9	Sanni Suhonen	Finland	5.89 (w: NWI)	x	5.88 w (w: +2.2 m/s)	5.89 (w: NWI)	
10	Natasha Brown	Bahamas	5.68 w (w: +2.9 m/s)	5.73 (w: +1.8 m/s)	5.32 (w: -0.3 m/s)	5.73 (w: +1.8 m/s)	
11	Svetlana Shtatnova	Soviet Union	5.24 w (w: +2.9 m/s)	4.98 (w: +0.9 m/s)	5.67 (w: +1.8 m/s)	5.67 (w: +1.8 m/s)	
12	Kathi Sabernig	Austria	5.57 (w: +0.4 m/s)	5.59 (w: +2.0 m/s)	5.66 (w: +1.5 m/s)	5.66 (w: +1.5 m/s)	
13	Daphne Saunders	Bahamas	x	5.48 (w: +1.8 m/s)	5.10 (w: +1.4 m/s)	5.48 (w: +1.8 m/s)	
14	Tsoseletso Sekgweng	Botswana	4.30 (w: NWI)	5.08 (w: +1.5 m/s)	4.79 (w: +0.8 m/s)	5.08 (w: +1.5 m/s)	
	Erin Tierney	Cook Islands	x	x	x	NM	

==== Group B ====
Rank	Name	Nationality	Attempts			Result	Notes
Rank	Name	Nationality	1	2	3	Result	Notes
1	Fiona May	United Kingdom	x	6.54 (w: +0.7 m/s)	-	6.54 (w: +0.7 m/s)	Q
2	Anu Kaljurand	Soviet Union	x	x	6.34 (w: +1.4 m/s)	6.34 (w: +1.4 m/s)	Q
3	Mirela Belu	Romania	x	6.22 (w: +0.3 m/s)	6.14 w (w: +2.6 m/s)	6.22 (w: +0.3 m/s)	q
4	Wang Shu-Hua	Chinese Taipei	6.03 (w: +0.5 m/s)	x	6.20 (w: +1.0 m/s)	6.20 (w: +1.0 m/s)	q
5	Yuki Inoue	Japan	x	5.75 (w: +0.6 m/s)	6.18 w (w: +2.9 m/s)	6.18 w (w: +2.9 m/s)	q
6	Wang Wenhong	China	x	5.87 (w: +1.0 m/s)	6.13 w (w: +3.2 m/s)	6.13 w (w: +3.2 m/s)	q
7	Simonetta Santoni	Italy	5.81 (w: +0.7 m/s)	6.05 (w: +1.3 m/s)	5.90 w (w: +3.5 m/s)	6.05 (w: +1.3 m/s)	q
8	Sharon Couch	United States	5.96 (w: +0.9 m/s)	x	5.99 (w: +1.1 m/s)	5.99 (w: +1.1 m/s)	q
9	Monique Dunstan	Australia	5.69 w (w: +2.1 m/s)	5.61 (w: +1.0 m/s)	5.98 (w: +1.3 m/s)	5.98 (w: +1.3 m/s)	
10	Judit Kovács	Hungary	5.91 (w: +0.8 m/s)	x	5.90 (w: +1.6 m/s)	5.91 (w: +0.8 m/s)	
11	Sonya Roberts	United States	5.75 (w: +1.3 m/s)	x	5.28 (w: +0.9 m/s)	5.75 (w: +1.3 m/s)	
12	Jacqueline Ross	Saint Vincent and the Grenadines	x	x	5.54 (w: +0.7 m/s)	5.54 (w: +0.7 m/s)	
13	Evelyn Cobbina	Ghana	4.80 (w: +0.8 m/s)	5.17 (w: +1.3 m/s)	x	5.17 (w: +1.3 m/s)	
14	Lorraine Nanton	Montserrat	5.12 (w: +0.8 m/s)	4.96 (w: +1.4 m/s)	x	5.12 (w: +0.8 m/s)	

== Participation ==
According to an unofficial count, 29 athletes from 22 countries participated in the event.

- Australia (1)
- Austria (1)
- Bahamas (2)
- Botswana (1)
- China (1)
- Chinese Taipei (1)
- Cook Islands (1)
- East Germany (1)
- Finland (1)
- Ghana (1)
- Hungary (2)
- Iceland (1)
- Italy (2)
- Jamaica (1)
- Japan (1)
- Montserrat (1)
- Romania (2)
- Saint Vincent and the Grenadines (1)
- Soviet Union (2)
- United Kingdom (2)
- United States (2)
- West Germany (1)
