= 2018 World Masters Athletics Championships Women =

The twenty-third World Masters Athletics Championships were held in Málaga, Spain, from September 4–September 16, 2018. This was the second even year of the biennial championship as beginning in 2016 in Perth, Australia, the championships moved to be held in even numbered years. The World Masters Athletics Championships serve the division of the sport of athletics for people over 35 years of age, referred to as Masters athletics.

A full range of track and field events were held, along with a cross country race and a marathon.

== Track results ==
=== 100 metres ===
All finals held on September 6, 2018

==== W35 100 metres ====
Wind: +0.1

Pos	Athlete	Country	Birthdate	Result
1st place, gold medalist(s)	Lucy Evans	Great Britain	02-Oct-1982	12.41
2nd place, silver medalist(s)	Dedeh Erawati	Indonesia	25-May-1979	12.63
3rd place, bronze medalist(s)	Christine Priegelmeir	Germany	28-Dec-1981	12.83

==== W40 100 metres ====
Wind: +0.0

Pos	Athlete	Country	Birthdate	Result
1st place, gold medalist(s)	Nadia Cunningham	Jamaica	25-May-1978	12.63
2nd place, silver medalist(s)	Alisha Fortune	Guyana	05-Jun-1975	12.66
3rd place, bronze medalist(s)	Susan McLoughlin	Great Britain	02-Jun-1977	12.75

==== W45 100 metres ====
Wind: +0.7

Pos	Athlete	Country	Birthdate	Result
1st place, gold medalist(s)	Yvette Henry	Great Britain	08-Jun-1973	12.59
2nd place, silver medalist(s)	Heike Martin	Germany	01-Jul-1972	12.77
3rd place, bronze medalist(s)	Lena Axelson	Sweden	12-Apr-1972	12.94

==== W50 100 metres ====
Wind: -0.6

Pos	Athlete	Country	Birthdate	Result
1st place, gold medalist(s)	Julie Brims	Australia	07-Jan-1966	12.96
2nd place, silver medalist(s)	Monalisa Rivera	Puerto Rico	27-Feb-1968	13.18
3rd place, bronze medalist(s)	Heike Jorg	Germany	25-Feb-1966	13.28

==== W55 100 metres ====
Wind: +0.6

Pos	Athlete	Country	Birthdate	Result
1st place, gold medalist(s)	Nicole Alexis	France	09-Jan-1960	13.53
2nd place, silver medalist(s)	Kirstin King	Great Britain	08-Jan-1962	13.57
3rd place, bronze medalist(s)	Joy Upshaw	United States	24-Feb-1961	13.64

==== W60 100 metres ====
Video on YouTube

Wind: -2.7

Pos	Athlete	Country	Birthdate	Result
1st place, gold medalist(s)	Nilsa Paris Millan	Puerto Rico	29-Apr-1957	14.30
2nd place, silver medalist(s)	Caroline Powell	Great Britain	21-Dec-1953	14.61
3rd place, bronze medalist(s)	Maria del Carmen Atella	Argentina	31-Jan-1958	14.79

==== W65 100 metres ====
Wind: -1.5

Pos	Athlete	Country	Birthdate	Result
1st place, gold medalist(s)	Karla Del Grande	Canada	25-Mar-1953	14.04
2nd place, silver medalist(s)	Joylyn Saunders-Mullins	Great Britain	27-Nov-1952	14.82
3rd place, bronze medalist(s)	Jane Barnes	United States	11-May-1952	15.52

==== W70 100 metres ====
Wind: -3.6

Pos	Athlete	Country	Birthdate	Result
1st place, gold medalist(s)	Aletta Ungerer	South Africa	15-Nov-1945	16.59
2nd place, silver medalist(s)	Sheryl Gower	New Zealand	25-Aug-1947	15.44
3rd place, bronze medalist(s)	Maria Diego Area	Spain	25-Jun-1947	15.55

==== W75 100 metres ====
Wind: -2.3

Pos	Athlete	Country	Birthdate	Result
1st place, gold medalist(s)	Carol LaFayette-Boyd	Canada	12-May-1942	15.41
2nd place, silver medalist(s)	Christine Waring	New Zealand	13-Aug-1943	17.66
3rd place, bronze medalist(s)	Hannelore Venn	Germany	09-Jan-1942	17.96

==== W80 100 metres ====
Wind: -1.9

Pos	Athlete	Country	Birthdate	Result
1st place, gold medalist(s)	Delmania Rose Green	United States	20-Aug-1938	18.10
2nd place, silver medalist(s)	Sumiko Yamakawa Imoto	Brazil	01-Mar-1938	18.28
3rd place, bronze medalist(s)	Miriam Cudmore	Australia	-Nov-1937	18.86

==== W85 100 metres ====
Wind: -2.8

Pos	Athlete	Country	Birthdate	Result
1st place, gold medalist(s)	Ernestina Ramirez Garcia	Mexico	06-Feb-1930	23.52
2nd place, silver medalist(s)	Clasina Van der Veeken	New Zealand	05-Aug-1931	26.50
3rd place, bronze medalist(s)	Ruth Helfenstein	Switzerland	15-Sep-1931	29.07

==== W90 100 meters ====
Wind: -3.1

Pos	Athlete	Country	Birthdate	Result
1st place, gold medalist(s)	Elena Pagu	Romania	25-Jul-1926	30.02

==== W100 100 meters ====
Wind: -3.1

Pos	Athlete	Country	Birthdate	Result
1st place, gold medalist(s)	Man Kaur	India	01-Mar-1916	DNS

=== 200 metres ===
All finals held on September 9, 2018

==== W35 200 metres ====
Wind: -1.3

Pos	Athlete	Country	Birthdate	Result
1st place, gold medalist(s)	Lucy Evans	Great Britain	02-Oct-1982	25.27
2nd place, silver medalist(s)	Carolina Garcia Garzon	Spain	17-Jan-1979	26.19
3rd place, bronze medalist(s)	Snezana Bechtina	Ireland	09-Nov-1981	26.23

==== W40 200 metres ====
Wind: -1.7

Pos	Athlete	Country	Birthdate	Result
1st place, gold medalist(s)	Alisha Fortune	Guyana	05-Jun-1975	25.77
2nd place, silver medalist(s)	Susie McLoughlin	Great Britain	02-Jun-1977	25.87
3rd place, bronze medalist(s)	Malgorzata Gasowska	Poland	18-Mar-1978	25.97

==== W45 200 metres ====
Wind: -0.3

Pos	Athlete	Country	Birthdate	Result
1st place, gold medalist(s)	Heike Martin	Germany	01-Jul-1972	26.48
2nd place, silver medalist(s)	Lena Axelson	Sweden	12-Apr-1972	26.51
3rd place, bronze medalist(s)	Emilia Paunica Paunica	Spain	08-Apr-1972	26.85

==== W50 200 metres ====
Wind: -0.3

Pos	Athlete	Country	Birthdate	Result
1st place, gold medalist(s)	Julie Brims	Australia	07-Jan-1966	26.81
2nd place, silver medalist(s)	Emmanuelle McGowan	United States	14-Jun-1968	27.30
3rd place, bronze medalist(s)	Heike Jorg	Germany	25-Feb-1966	27.51

==== W55 200 metres ====
Wind: +0.9

Pos	Athlete	Country	Birthdate	Result
1st place, gold medalist(s)	Joy Upshaw	United States	24-Feb-1961	27.97
2nd place, silver medalist(s)	Elizabeth Wilson	New Zealand	10-Nov-1962	28.04
3rd place, bronze medalist(s)	Kirstin King	Great Britain	08-Jan-1962	28.32

==== W60 200 metres ====
Wind: +1.0

Pos	Athlete	Country	Birthdate	Result
1st place, gold medalist(s)	Nilsa Paris	Puerto Rico	29-Apr-1957	28.85
2nd place, silver medalist(s)	Caroline Powell	Great Britain	21-Dec-1953	29.48
3rd place, bronze medalist(s)	Helen Godsell	Great Britain	01-Feb-1954	29.93

==== W65 200 metres ====
Wind: +4.1

Pos	Athlete	Country	Birthdate	Result
1st place, gold medalist(s)	Karla Del Grande	Canada	25-Mar-1953	28.83
2nd place, silver medalist(s)	Joylyn Saunders-Mullins	Great Britain	27-Nov-1952	30.67
3rd place, bronze medalist(s)	Evelyn Peake	Australia	14-Jan-1950	32.27

==== W70 200 metres ====
Wind: -1.3

Pos	Athlete	Country	Birthdate	Result
1st place, gold medalist(s)	Sheryl Gower	New Zealand	25-Aug-1947	33.58
2nd place, silver medalist(s)	Aletta "Toy" Ungerer	South Africa	15-Nov-1945	34.57
3rd place, bronze medalist(s)	Marjorie Allison	Australia	13-Sep-1944	34.59

==== W75 200 metres ====
Wind: -0.7

Pos	Athlete	Country	Birthdate	Result
1st place, gold medalist(s)	Carol LaFayette-Boyd	Canada	17-May-1942	31.56 WR
2nd place, silver medalist(s)	Hannelore Venn	Germany	09-Jan-1942	37.81
3rd place, bronze medalist(s)	Christine Waring	New Zealand	13-Aug-1943	37.84

==== W80 200 metres ====
Wind: -2.1

Pos	Athlete	Country	Birthdate	Result
1st place, gold medalist(s)	Delmania Rose Green	United States	20-Aug-1938	38.54
2nd place, silver medalist(s)	Corinne Collins	Australia	11-Jul-1936	40.43
3rd place, bronze medalist(s)	Jeanne Daprano	United States	16-Sep-1936	41.90

==== W85 200 metres ====
Wind: -1.8

Pos	Athlete	Country	Birthdate	Result
1st place, gold medalist(s)	Ernestina Ramirez Garcia	Mexico	06-Feb-1930	51.87
2nd place, silver medalist(s)	Ruth Helfenstein	Switzerland	15-Sep-1931	58.01
3rd place, bronze medalist(s)	Thelma Wilson	United States	01-Nov-1929	58.78

==== W100 200 metres ====
Wind: -1.8

Pos	Athlete	Country	Birthdate	Result
1st place, gold medalist(s)	Man Kaur	India	01-Mar-1916	3:14.65

=== 400 metres ===
All finals held on September 14, 2018

==== W35 400 metres ====
Pos	Athlete	Country	Birthdate	Result
1st place, gold medalist(s)	Kelly Johana Benitez	Spain	24-May-1982	56.75
2nd place, silver medalist(s)	Snezana Bechtina	Ireland	09-Nov-1981	57.58
3rd place, bronze medalist(s)	Kudirat Akhigbe	Nigeria	29-Dec-1981	58.03

==== W40 400 metres ====
Pos	Athlete	Country	Birthdate	Result
1st place, gold medalist(s)	Susan McLoughlin	Great Britain	02-Jun-1977	57.79
2nd place, silver medalist(s)	Alisha Fortune	Guyana	05-Jun-1975	58.36
3rd place, bronze medalist(s)	Cynthia Monteleone	United States	25-Feb-1976	58.44

==== W45 400 metres ====
Pos	Athlete	Country	Birthdate	Result
1st place, gold medalist(s)	LaTrica Dendy	United States	05-Nov-1972	58.67
2nd place, silver medalist(s)	Tatjana Schilling	Germany	05-Oct-1970	59.71
3rd place, bronze medalist(s)	Sharon Davis	Australia	-1973	1:00.30

==== W50 400 metres ====
Pos	Athlete	Country	Birthdate	Result
1st place, gold medalist(s)	Emmanuelle McGowan	United States	14-Jun-1968	1:01.02
2nd place, silver medalist(s)	Winnie de Winnaar	South Africa	08-Jan-1967	1:01.56
3rd place, bronze medalist(s)	Julie Brims	Australia	07-Jan-1966	1:02.31

==== W55 400 metres ====
Pos	Athlete	!Country	Birthdate	Result
1st place, gold medalist(s)	Virginia Mitchell	Great Britain	29-Jan-1963	1:02.16
2nd place, silver medalist(s)	Elizabeth Wilson	New Zealand	10-Nov-1962	1:03.98
3rd place, bronze medalist(s)	Sigrid Gutierrez Marin	Costa Rica	11-May-1963	1:04.79

==== W60 400 metres ====
Pos	Athlete	Country	Birthdate	Result
1st place, gold medalist(s)	Caroline Powell	Great Britain	21-Dec-1953	1:06.67
2nd place, silver medalist(s)	Nilsa Paris Millan	Puerto Rico	29-Apr-1957	1:08.79
3rd place, bronze medalist(s)	Sara Montecinos	Chile	08-Mar-1954	1:09.21

==== W65 400 metres ====
Pos	Athlete	Country	Birthdate	Result
1st place, gold medalist(s)	Karla Del Grande	Canada	25-Mar-1953	1:08.22
2nd place, silver medalist(s)	Joylyn Saunders-Mullins	Great Britain	27-Nov-1952	1:09.79
3rd place, bronze medalist(s)	Caroline Marler	Great Britain	25-Dec-1950	1:12.76

==== W70 400 metres ====
Pos	Athlete	Country	Birthdate	Result
1st place, gold medalist(s)	Angela Copson	Great Britain	20-Apr-1947	1:17.47
2nd place, silver medalist(s)	Sheryl Gower	New Zealand	25-Aug-1947	1:17.76
3rd place, bronze medalist(s)	Maija Kumpula	Finland	05-Mar-1947	1:18.57

==== W75 400 metres ====
Pos	Athlete	Country	Birthdate	Result
1st place, gold medalist(s)	Kathleen Stewart	Great Britain	07-Aug-1939	1:28.11
2nd place, silver medalist(s)	Christine Waring	New Zealand	13-Aug-1943	1:29.23
3rd place, bronze medalist(s)	Anne Lang	Australia	10-Feb-1943	1:29.51

==== W80 400 metres ====
Pos	Athlete	Country	Birthdate	Result
1st place, gold medalist(s)	Delmania Rose Green	United States	20-Aug-1938	1:33.94
2nd place, silver medalist(s)	Leontine Vitola	Latvia	24-Dec-1937	1:34.40
3rd place, bronze medalist(s)	Jeanne Daprano	United States	16-Sep-1936	1:37.26

==== W85 400 metres ====
Pos	Athlete	Country	Birthdate	Result
1st place, gold medalist(s)	Alice Cole	Canada	21-Jul-1933	1:58.68
2nd place, silver medalist(s)	Ernestina Ramirez Garcia	Mexico	06-Feb-1930	2:01.73
3rd place, bronze medalist(s)	Thelma Wilson	United States	01-Nov-1929	2:18.02

=== 800 metres ===
All finals held September 11, 2018

==== W35 800 metres ====
Video on YouTube

Pos	Athlete	Birthdate	Country	Result
1st place, gold medalist(s)	Fiona de Mauny	03-Feb-1983	Great Britain	2:10.24
2nd place, silver medalist(s)	Paula Viviana Ramirez Parra	04-Sep-1983	Spain	2:13.24
3rd place, bronze medalist(s)	Olga Koppen	...-...-1978	Germany	2:14.97

==== W40 800 metres ====
Video on YouTube

Pos	Athlete	Birthdate	Country	Result
1st place, gold medalist(s)	Kelly Neely	17-Jun-1978	Ireland	2:12.74
2nd place, silver medalist(s)	Denise Toner	17-Apr-1978	Ireland	2:13.86
3rd place, bronze medalist(s)	Zoe Doyle	13-Jun-1978	Great Britain	2:14.62

==== W45 800 metres ====
Video on YouTube

Pos	Athlete	Birthdate	Country	Result
1st place, gold medalist(s)	Courtney Babcock	30-Jun-1972	Canada	2:21.36
2nd place, silver medalist(s)	Sharon Davis	..-..-1973	Australia	2:21.41
3rd place, bronze medalist(s)	Paola Tiselli	13-Jul-1973	Italy	2:22.41

==== W50 800 metres ====
Video on YouTube

Pos	Athlete	Birthdate	Country	Result
1st place, gold medalist(s)	Eva Trost	30-Jan-1968	Germany	2:18.25
2nd place, silver medalist(s)	Nicole Weijling-Dissel	16-Jun-1967	Netherlands	2:19.91
3rd place, bronze medalist(s)	Anne Gilshinan	06-Apr-1964	Ireland	2:20.20

==== W55 800 metres ====
Video on YouTube

Pos	Athlete	Birthdate	Country	Result
1st place, gold medalist(s)	Virginia Mitchell	29-Jan-1963	Great Britain	2:26.08
2nd place, silver medalist(s)	Yvonne Crilly	15-Nov-1961	Great Britain	2:30.76
3rd place, bronze medalist(s)	Christine Anthony	26-Jan-1963	Great Britain	2:32.47

==== W60 800 metres ====
Video on YouTube

Pos	Athlete	Birthdate	Country	Result
1st place, gold medalist(s)	Patty Blanchard	26-Sep-1957	Canada	2:38.22
2nd place, silver medalist(s)	Lesley Hinz	16-Mar-1958	United States	2:38.25
3rd place, bronze medalist(s)	Deborah Drennan	17-May-1958	Australia	2:42.58

==== W65 800 metres ====
Video on YouTube

Pos	Athlete	Birthdate	Country	Result
1st place, gold medalist(s)	Alison Bourgeois	30-Apr-1953	Great Britain	2:44.62
2nd place, silver medalist(s)	Sabra Harvey	02-Mar-1949	United States	2:46.45
3rd place, bronze medalist(s)	Ulla Karneback	09-May-1953	Sweden	2:55.22

==== W70 800 metres ====
Pos	Athlete	Birthdate	Country	Result
1st place, gold medalist(s)	Angela Copson	20-Apr-1947	Great Britain	2:54.63
2nd place, silver medalist(s)	Maija Kumpula	05-Mar-1947	Finland	3:07.22
3rd place, bronze medalist(s)	Anne Dockery	11-May-1948	Great Britain	3:18.12

==== W75 800 metres ====
Pos	Athlete	Birthdate	Country	Result
1st place, gold medalist(s)	Inkeri Janhunen	23-Aug-1941	Finland	3:32.88
2nd place, silver medalist(s)	Beverley Wills	25-Jan-1942	United States	3:35.43
3rd place, bronze medalist(s)	Anne Lang	10-Feb-1943	Australia	3:36.82

==== W80 800 metres ====
Pos	Athlete	Birthdate	Country	Result
1st place, gold medalist(s)	Yoko Nakano	01-Dec-1935	Japan	3:30.41 WR
2nd place, silver medalist(s)	Elfriede Hodapp	15-Jun-1935	Germany	3:58.96
3rd place, bronze medalist(s)	Jeanne Daprano	16-Sep-1936	United States	4:00.30

==== W85 800 metres ====
Pos	Athlete	Birthdate	Country	Result
1st place, gold medalist(s)	Melitta Czerwenka-Nagel	30-Apr-1930	Germany	4:37.36
2nd place, silver medalist(s)	Alice Cole	21-Jul-1933	Canada	4:52.32
3rd place, bronze medalist(s)	Thelma Wilson	01-Nov-1929	United States	5:24.92

=== 1500 metres ===
All finals held September 16, 2018

==== W35 1500 metres ====
Video on YouTube

Pos	Athlete	Birthdate	Country	Result
1st place, gold medalist(s)	Soumaya Bousaid	05-May-1980	Tunisia	4:36.54
2nd place, silver medalist(s)	Fiona de Mauny	03-Feb-1983	Great Britain	4:37.44
3rd place, bronze medalist(s)	Beatriz Antolin	08-Aug-1982	Spain	4:38.81

==== W40 1500 metres ====
Video on YouTube

Pos	Athlete	Birthdate	Country	Result
1st place, gold medalist(s)	Kelly Neely	17-Jun-1978	Ireland	4:36.35
2nd place, silver medalist(s)	Zoe Doyle	13-Jun-1978	Great Britain	4:36.64
3rd place, bronze medalist(s)	Nelly Jeptanui		Kenya	4:37.04

==== W45 1500 metres ====
Pos	Athlete	Birthdate	Country	Result
1st place, gold medalist(s)	Courtney Babcock	30-Jun-1972	Canada	4:47.88
2nd place, silver medalist(s)	Sharon Davis	..-..-1973	Australia	4:49.56
3rd place, bronze medalist(s)	Paola Tiselli	13-Jul-1973	Italy	4:49.80

==== W50 1500 metres ====
Video on YouTube

Pos	Athlete	Birthdate	Country	Result
1st place, gold medalist(s)	Eva Trost	30-Jan-1968	Germany	4:38.80
2nd place, silver medalist(s)	Nicole Weijling-Dissel	16-Jun-1967	Netherlands	4:40.20
3rd place, bronze medalist(s)	Anne Gilshinan	06-Apr-1964	Ireland	4:40.67

==== W55 1500 metres ====
Video on YouTube

Pos	Athlete	Birthdate	Country	Result
1st place, gold medalist(s)	Sally Gibbs	05-Jun-1963	New Zealand	4:54.96
2nd place, silver medalist(s)	Maria Esther Pedrosa Carrete	19-May-1961	Spain	5:03.27
3rd place, bronze medalist(s)	Fiona Matheson	25-Apr-1961	Great Britain	5:03.43

==== W60 1500 metres ====
Pos	Athlete	Birthdate	Country	Result
1st place, gold medalist(s)	Lesley Hinz	16-Mar-1958	United States	5:35.64
2nd place, silver medalist(s)	Patty Blanchard	26-Sep-1957	Canada	5:36.14
3rd place, bronze medalist(s)	Francesca Grazia Barone	27-Jun-1958	Italy	5:37.37

==== W65 1500 metres ====
Pos	Athlete	Birthdate	Country	Result
1st place, gold medalist(s)	Alison Bourgeois	30-Apr-1953	Great Britain	5:33.22
2nd place, silver medalist(s)	Sabra Harvey	02-Mar-1949	United States	5:37.97
3rd place, bronze medalist(s)	Rosalind Tabor	06-Aug-1949	Great Britain	5:55.79

==== W70 1500 metres ====
Pos	Athlete	Birthdate	Country	Result
1st place, gold medalist(s)	Angela Copson	20-Apr-1947	Great Britain	5:48.07
2nd place, silver medalist(s)	Maija Kumpula	05-Mar-1947	Finland	6:18.61
3rd place, bronze medalist(s)	Anne Dockery	11-May-1948	Great Britain	6:41.49

==== W75 1500 metres ====
Pos	Athlete	Birthdate	Country	Result
1st place, gold medalist(s)	Maria Bachsmann	13-Oct-1942	Chile	7:33.63
2nd place, silver medalist(s)	Beverley Wills	25-Jan-1942	United States	7:35.43
3rd place, bronze medalist(s)	Mary Campbell	01-Aug-1942	Australia	7:52.25

==== W80 1500 metres ====
Pos	Athlete	Birthdate	Country	Result
1st place, gold medalist(s)	Elfriede Hodapp	15-Jun-1935	Germany	8:14.68
2nd place, silver medalist(s)	Jeanne Daprano	16-Sep-1936	United States	8:39.12
3rd place, bronze medalist(s)	Martha Judith Mendiburo Arevalo	26-Oct-1937	Mexico	8:50.73

==== W85 1500 metres ====
Pos	Athlete	Birthdate	Country	Result
1st place, gold medalist(s)	Alice Cole	21-Jul-1933	Canada	10:40.96
2nd place, silver medalist(s)	Melitta Czerwenka-Nagel	30-Apr-1930	Germany	10:41.10
3rd place, bronze medalist(s)	Ruth Helfenstein	15-Sep-1931	Switzerland	11:03.56

=== 5000 metres ===
Held September 12, 2018, most divisions as two timed finals

==== W35 5000 metres ====
30 athletes, 2 timed heats. All medalists ran in heat 2

Pos	Athlete	Birthdate	Country	Result
1st place, gold medalist(s)	Innes Chenonge	01-Feb-1982	Kenya	16:38.64
2nd place, silver medalist(s)	Olga Firsova	11-May-1983	Czech Republic	17:08.39
3rd place, bronze medalist(s)	Isabela Ochichi	28-Oct-1979	Kenya	17:20.75

==== W40 5000 metres ====
27 athletes, 2 timed heats. All medalists ran in heat 2

Pos	Athlete	Birthdate	Country	Result
1st place, gold medalist(s)	Joice Kirui	12-Dec-1974	Kenya	17:21.66
2nd place, silver medalist(s)	Elisa Hernandez Asensio	23-May-1977	Spain	17:41.73
3rd place, bronze medalist(s)	Sonia Maria Conceicao Lopes	06-Apr-1975	Italy	17:43.12

==== W45 5000 metres ====
29 athletes, 2 timed heats. All medalists ran in heat 2

Pos	Athlete	Birthdate	Country	Result
1st place, gold medalist(s)	Isabel Almaraz Mulas	22-Mar-1972	Spain	17:46.91
2nd place, silver medalist(s)	Emma Stepto	04-Apr-1970	Great Britain	17:52.98
3rd place, bronze medalist(s)	Miriam Paurat	..-..-1973	Germany	18:20.85

==== W50 5000 metres ====
34 athletes, 2 timed heats. All medalists ran in heat 2

Pos	Athlete	Birthdate	Country	Result
1st place, gold medalist(s)	Nicole Weijling-Dissel	16-Jun-1967	Netherlands	18:13.13
2nd place, silver medalist(s)	Gail Griffiths	12-Mar-1965	Great Britain	18:16.45
3rd place, bronze medalist(s)	Kathryn Bailey	25-Mar-1968	Great Britain	18:32.93

==== W55 5000 metres ====
28 athletes, 2 timed heats. All medalists ran in heat 2

Pos	Athlete	Birthdate	Country	Result
1st place, gold medalist(s)	Sally Gibbs	05-Jun-1963	New Zealand	17:46.52
2nd place, silver medalist(s)	Fiona Matheson	25-Apr-1961	Great Britain	18:29.56
3rd place, bronze medalist(s)	Maria Esther Pedrosa Carrete	19-May-1961	Spain	18:56.22

==== W60 5000 metres ====
29 athletes, 2 timed heats. All medalists ran in heat 2

Pos	Athlete	Birthdate	Country	Result
1st place, gold medalist(s)	Patty Blanchard	26-Sep-1957	Canada	20:29.07
2nd place, silver medalist(s)	Christine Kennedy	29-Dec-1954	United States	20:30.66
3rd place, bronze medalist(s)	Christine Adamson	03-Oct-1956	New Zealand	20:38.81

==== W65 5000 metres ====
Pos	Athlete	Birthdate	Country	Result
1st place, gold medalist(s)	Sabra Harvey	02-Mar-1949	United States	20:52.41
2nd place, silver medalist(s)	Margret Goettnauer	24-Jun-1952	Germany	22:02.79
3rd place, bronze medalist(s)	Elisabeth Westphal	..-..-1951	Germany	22:27.58

==== W70 5000 metres ====
Pos	Athlete	Birthdate	Country	Result
1st place, gold medalist(s)	Angela Copson	20-Apr-1947	Great Britain	22:08.19
2nd place, silver medalist(s)	Judith Stewart	26-Aug-1948	New Zealand	23:57.48
3rd place, bronze medalist(s)	Anne Dockery	11-May-1948	Great Britain	24:13.91

==== W75 5000 metres ====
Pos	Athlete	Birthdate	Country	Result
1st place, gold medalist(s)	Inkeri Janhunen	23-Aug-1941	Finland	25:41.57
2nd place, silver medalist(s)	Hannele Kivisto	24-Aug-1943	Finland	26:40.06
3rd place, bronze medalist(s)	Josette Maillard	01-Aug-1942	France	26:40.55

==== W80 5000 metres ====
Pos	Athlete	Birthdate	Country	Result
1st place, gold medalist(s)	Yoko Nakano	01-Dec-1935	Japan	25:40.14 WR
2nd place, silver medalist(s)	Denise Leclerc	10-Oct-1933	France	30:45.14
3rd place, bronze medalist(s)	Lynne Hurrell	04-Aug-1934	United States	32:10.86

=== Short hurdles ===
All finals held September 15, 2018

==== W40 80 metres hurdles ====
Wind: +1.3

Pos	Athlete	Birthdate	Country	Result
1st place, gold medalist(s)	Annette Funck	24-nov-1977	Germany	11.37
2nd place, silver medalist(s)	Rachel Guest	15-Apr-1975	United States	11.73
3rd place, bronze medalist(s)	Yanelle Del Mar Zape	13-Jul-1976	Colombia	11.81

==== W45 80 metres hurdles ====
Wind: +1.2

Pos	Athlete	Birthdate	Country	Result
1st place, gold medalist(s)	Evelin Nagel	12-Jan-1971	Germany	11.97
2nd place, silver medalist(s)	Maria Costanza Moroni	08-Apr-1969	Italy	12.40
3rd place, bronze medalist(s)	Angeles Guerra Hurtado	19-Mar-1969	Spain	12.49

==== W50 80 metres hurdles ====
Wind: -0.3

Pos	Athlete	Birthdate	Country	Result
1st place, gold medalist(s)	Katrin Mertanen	09-Nov-1966	Finland	12.71
2nd place, silver medalist(s)	Neringa Jakstiene	18-Oct-1963	Lithuania	12.80
3rd place, bronze medalist(s)	Harumi Nakao	06-Sep-1966	Japan	13.16

==== W55 80 metres hurdles ====
Wind: +0.1

Pos	Athlete	Birthdate	Country	Result
1st place, gold medalist(s)	Olga Becker	10-Aug-1961	Germany	13.01
2nd place, silver medalist(s)	Sally Stagles	20-Sep-1960	Australia	13.09
3rd place, bronze medalist(s)	Joy Upshaw	24-Feb-1961	United States	13.12

==== W60 80 metres hurdles ====
Wind: -1.2

Pos	Athlete	Birthdate	Country	Result
1st place, gold medalist(s)	Jane Horder	18-Jan-1957	Great Britain	13.15
2nd place, silver medalist(s)	Carole Filer	28-Nov-1955	Great Britain	14.44
3rd place, bronze medalist(s)	Rita Hanscom	11-May-1954	United States	14.91

==== W65 80 metres hurdles ====
Wind: -1.2

Pos	Athlete	Birthdate	Country	Result
1st place, gold medalist(s)	Ulla Karneback	09-May-1953	Sweden	15.35
2nd place, silver medalist(s)	Jean Fail	26-Aug-1949	Great Britain	15.57
3rd place, bronze medalist(s)	Ursula Schmidt	03-Jan-1952	Germany	16.77

==== W70 80 metres hurdles ====
Wind: +0.1

Pos	Athlete	Birthdate	Country	Result
1st place, gold medalist(s)	Terhi Kokkonen	13-Jun-1947	Finland	17.28
2nd place, silver medalist(s)	Marge Allison	13-Sep-1944	Australia	17.54
3rd place, bronze medalist(s)	Margaritha Dahler-Stettler	21-Aug-1947	Switzerland	18.51

==== W75 80 metres hurdles ====
Wind: -0.7

Pos	Athlete	Birthdate	Country	Result
1st place, gold medalist(s)	Marianne Maier	25-Dec-1942	Austria	17.37
2nd place, silver medalist(s)	Kerstin Nilsson	10-Sep-1942	Sweden	20.01
3rd place, bronze medalist(s)	Patricia Hill	03-Sep-1940	Great Britain	23.919

==== W80 80 metres hurdles ====
Wind: -0.7

Pos	Athlete	Birthdate	Country	Result
1st place, gold medalist(s)	Sumiko Yamakawa Imoto	01-Mar-1938	Brazil	19.58
2nd place, silver medalist(s)	Christel Donley	20-Jan-1935	United States	27.31

==== W35 100 metres hurdles ====
Wind: -1.5

Pos	Athlete	Birthdate	Country	Result
1st place, gold medalist(s)	Dedeh Erawati	25-May-1979	Indonesia	14.50
2nd place, silver medalist(s)	Laurence Guillet	20-Oct-1980	Belgium	14.80
3rd place, bronze medalist(s)	Emma Valencia Garcia	13-Jul-1981	Spain	15.39

=== Long hurdles ===
All finals held September 7, 2018

==== W70 200 metres hurdles ====
Wind: -0.3

Pos	Athlete	Birthdate	Country	Result
1st place, gold medalist(s)	Marge Allison	13-Sep-1944	Australia	38.36
2nd place, silver medalist(s)	Terhi Kokkonen	13-Jun-1947	Finland	40.56
3rd place, bronze medalist(s)	Mirtha Perez	27-Apr-1948	Chile	44.14

==== W75 200 metres hurdles ====
Wind: -0.4

Pos	Athlete	Birthdate	Country	Result
1st place, gold medalist(s)	Kerstin Nilsson	10-Sep-1942	Sweden	49.69

==== W50 300 metres hurdles ====
Pos	Athlete	Birthdate	Country	Result
1st place, gold medalist(s)	Katrin Mertanen	09-Nov-1966	Finland	48.44
2nd place, silver medalist(s)	Jaqualine Bezuidenhout	15-Oct-1966	Australia	49.32
3rd place, bronze medalist(s)	Andrea Collier	30-Oct-1966	United States	50.75

==== W55 300 metres hurdles ====
Pos	Athlete	Birthdate	Country	Result
1st place, gold medalist(s)	Michele Hossack	22-Oct-1960	Australia	49.49
2nd place, silver medalist(s)	Adriene Allen	15-Oct-1961	United States	51.30
3rd place, bronze medalist(s)	Susan Frisby	09-Apr-1960	Great Britain	52.51

==== W60 300 metres hurdles ====
Pos	Athlete	Birthdate	Country	Result
1st place, gold medalist(s)	Jane Horder	18-Jan-1957	Great Britain	52.04
2nd place, silver medalist(s)	Anny Undheim	31-Aug-1956	Norway	54.60
3rd place, bronze medalist(s)	Gunnel Tolfes	25-Jan-1958	Sweden	57.07

==== W65 300 metres hurdles ====
Pos	Athlete	Birthdate	Country	Result
1st place, gold medalist(s)	Ulla Karneback	09-May-1953	Sweden	59.23
2nd place, silver medalist(s)	Tina Bowman	02-May-1953	United States	1:01.90
3rd place, bronze medalist(s)	Ursula Schmidt	03-Jan-1952	Germany	1:01.93

==== W35 400 metres hurdles ====
Pos	Athlete	Birthdate	Country	Result
1st place, gold medalist(s)	Carolina Garcia Garzon	17-Jan-1979	Spain	1:03.93
2nd place, silver medalist(s)	Laurence Guillet	20-Oct-1980	Belgium	1:10.19
3rd place, bronze medalist(s)	Milda Zubaviciene	25-Jan-1980	Lithuania	1:11.32

==== W40 400 metres hurdles ====
Pos	Athlete	Birthdate	Country	Result
1st place, gold medalist(s)	Maren Schott	11-Feb-1976	Germany	1:01.97
2nd place, silver medalist(s)	Angela López Marti	14-Oct-1975	Spain	1:03.07
3rd place, bronze medalist(s)	Susana Estriga	16-Jul-1975	Portugal	1:04.52

==== W45 400 metres hurdles ====
Pos	Athlete	Birthdate	Country	Result
1st place, gold medalist(s)	LaTrica Dendy	05-Nov-1972	United States	1:05.92
2nd place, silver medalist(s)	Cassandra Sprenger	15-Mar-1973	Italy	1:06.27
3rd place, bronze medalist(s)	Lenorë Lambert	10-Oct-1969	Australia	1:06.40

=== Steeplechase ===
Held September 7, 2018

==== W35 2000 metres steeplechase ====
Pos	Athlete	Birthdate	Country	Result
1st place, gold medalist(s)	Eva Arias Aira	08-Oct-1980	Spain	6:51.32
2nd place, silver medalist(s)	Iraia Garcia Etxebarria	16-Sep-1982	Spain	6:53.10
3rd place, bronze medalist(s)	Vanesa Pacha Urteaga	09-Feb-1982	Spain	6:58.91

==== W40 2000 metres steeplechase ====
Pos	Athlete	Birthdate	Country	Result
1st place, gold medalist(s)	Danuta Woszczek	20-Feb-1978	Poland	7:04.33
2nd place, silver medalist(s)	Samira Mhamdi Taalabi	27-Apr-1977	Spain	7:07.02
3rd place, bronze medalist(s)	Sonia Maria Conceicao Lopes	06-Apr-1975	Italy	7:12.30

==== W45 2000 metres steeplechase ====
Pos	Athlete	Birthdate	Country	Result
1st place, gold medalist(s)	Minori Hayakari	29-Nov-1972	Japan	6:51.51 WR
2nd place, silver medalist(s)	Ana Ramos-Villaverde	26-Jul-1973	Great Britain	7:58.91
3rd place, bronze medalist(s)	Maria Dolores Jimenez Guardeno	28-Mar-1969	Spain	8:01.40

==== W50 2000 metres steeplechase ====
Video on YouTube

Pos	Athlete	Birthdate	Country	Result
1st place, gold medalist(s)	Lyudmyla Pushkina	02-Oct-1965	Ukraine	8:08.09
2nd place, silver medalist(s)	Niobe Menendez Lynch	01-Sep-1966	Spain	8:10.63
3rd place, bronze medalist(s)	Katja Knospe	..-..-1966	Germany	8:11.69

==== W55 2000 metres steeplechase ====
Video on YouTube

Pos	Athlete	Birthdate	Country	Result
1st place, gold medalist(s)	Patrizia Passerini	18-Oct-1962	Italy	8:40.46
2nd place, silver medalist(s)	Zofia Wieciorkowska	21-Jan-1963	Poland	8:50.41
3rd place, bronze medalist(s)	Cheryl Bellaire	08-Feb-1959	United States	8:55.62

==== W60 2000 metres steeplechase ====
Pos	Athlete	Birthdate	Country	Result
1st place, gold medalist(s)	Roswita Schlachte	01-Aug-1955	Germany	9:07.37
2nd place, silver medalist(s)	Margaret Saunders	28-Dec-1953	Australia	9:10.19
3rd place, bronze medalist(s)	Elisabeth Henn	03-Aug-1957	Germany	9:17.93

==== W65 2000 metres steeplechase ====
Pos	Athlete	Birthdate	Country	Result
1st place, gold medalist(s)	Eliisa Reijonen	22-Nov-1952	Finland	9:59.49
2nd place, silver medalist(s)	Rogelia Pussetto	02-Aug-1950	Argentina	11:45.16
3rd place, bronze medalist(s)	Alicja Wlodarczyk	11-May-1952	Poland	13:26.64

==== W70 2000 metres steeplechase ====
Pos	Athlete	Birthdate	Country	Result
1st place, gold medalist(s)	Gillian Young	21-Jul-1947	Australia	10:25.65
2nd place, silver medalist(s)	Irene Davey	08-Jun-1947	Australia	11:33.40
3rd place, bronze medalist(s)	Miloslava Rocnakova	28-Feb-1945	Czech Republic	12:20.16

==== W75 2000 metres steeplechase ====
Pos	Athlete	Birthdate	Country	Result
1st place, gold medalist(s)	Anne Lang	10-Feb-1943	Australia	12:48.54
2nd place, silver medalist(s)	Lynne Schickert	18-Oct-1941	Australia	16:00.36
3rd place, bronze medalist(s)	Maria Sanchez Vega		Chile	16:16.58

=== 4x100 metres relay ===
All relays September 16, 2018

==== W35 4x100 metres relay ====
7 teams

Pos	Country	Members/Age	Result
1st place, gold medalist(s)	Spain	1) Esther Garcia Sanchez 2) Carolina Garcia Garzon; 3) Yolanda Garcia Suarez 4) Laura Rodas Rincon	48.86
2nd place, silver medalist(s)	Canada	1) Khama Beckles 2) Natacha Dupuis; 3) Melinda Hidi 4) Alessia Berti	50.41
3rd place, bronze medalist(s)	United States	1) Ahndraea Allen 2) Easter Grant; 3) Latesha Short 4) Angela Myers	50.41

==== W40 4x100 metres relay ====
10 teams, 1 heat on a 9 lane track

Pos	Country	Members/Age	Result
1st place, gold medalist(s)	United States	1) Cynthia Monteleone 2) Rachel Guest; 3) Lisa Edwards 4) Cynthia McNamee	49.38
2nd place, silver medalist(s)	Sweden	1) Jenny Rosen 2) Anna Bjorkstedt; 3) Jenny Akervall 4) Lena Axelson	50.59
3rd place, bronze medalist(s)	Germany	1) Jutta Bergener 2) Tatjana Schilling; 3) Jennifer Gartmann 4) Kerstin Drewes	50.97

==== W45 4x100 metres relay ====
10 teams, 2 heats as timed finals

Pos	Country	Members/Age	Heat	Result
1st place, gold medalist(s)	Spain	1) Assum Puig Planella 2) Mireia Gorju Solsona; 3) Laura Gloria Moneo 4) Emilia Paunica Paunica	1	51.19
2nd place, silver medalist(s)	Italy	1) Silvia Servadei 2) Maria Costanza Moroni; 3) Paola Paolicchi 4) Cristina Sanulli	2	53.32
3rd place, bronze medalist(s)	United States	1) Darmesha Watkins 2) LaTrica Dendy; 3) Ruthlyn Greenfield-Webster 4) Lisa Daley	2	53.55

==== W50 4x100 metres relay ====
11 teams, 2 heats as timed finals

Pos	Country	Members/Age	Heat	Result
1st place, gold medalist(s)	Australia	1) Stephanie Noon 2) Julie Brims; 3) Jaqualine Bezuidenhout 4) Mandy Mason	2	51.89
2nd place, silver medalist(s)	United States	1) Venus Jewett 2) Andrea Collier; 3) LaDonna Gooden 4) Roxanne Brockner	2	51.93
3rd place, bronze medalist(s)	Germany	1) Heike Siebel 2) Heike Jorg; 3) Angelika Mader 4) Urte Alisch	1	53.45

==== W55 4x100 metres relay ====
10 teams, 2 heats as timed finals

Pos	Country	Members/Age	Heat	Result
1st place, gold medalist(s)	United States	1) Sandy Triolo 2) Adriene Allen; 3) Kathleen Shook 4) Joy Upshaw	2	54.05
2nd place, silver medalist(s)	Germany	1) Frauke Viebahn 2) Brigitte Heidrich; 3) Petra Kauerhof 4) Jutta Stopka	1	54.63
3rd place, bronze medalist(s)	Great Britain	1) Melanie Garland 2) Honoria Font; 3) Kirstin King 4) Angela Sonn	1	56.52

==== W60 4x100 metres relay ====
10 teams, 2 heats as timed finals

Pos	Country	Members/Age	Heat	Result
1st place, gold medalist(s)	Great Britain	1) Helen Godsell 2) Averil McClelland; 3) Jane Horder 4) Caroline Powell	2	55.98
2nd place, silver medalist(s)	Germany	1) Gisela Pletschen 2) Silvia Bloedorn; 3) Angelika Heidemann 4) Birgit Grisse	1	59.32
3rd place, bronze medalist(s)	Finland	1) Tuula Siekkinen 2) Anna-Liisa Salminen; 3) Anne Nurmi 4) Leena Tenhu	1	1:01.54

==== W65 4x100 metres relay ====
Pos	Country	Members/Age	Result
1st place, gold medalist(s)	Great Britain	1) Sue Dassie 2) Caroline Marler; 3) Jean Fail 4) Joylyn Saunders-Mullins	1:02.11
2nd place, silver medalist(s)	Australia	1) Wilma Perkins 2) Evelyn Peake; 3) Marge Allison 4) Rosemary Dean	1:04.00
3rd place, bronze medalist(s)	Germany	1) Marion Ertl 2) Kristina Hanke; 3) Ingeborg Thoma 4) Ute Ritte	1:06.44

==== W70 4x100 metres relay ====
Pos	Country	Members/Age	Result
1st place, gold medalist(s)	Finland	1) Terhi Kokkonen 2) Maija Kumpula; 3) Pirjo Karetie 4) Marjatta Taipale	1:14.88
2nd place, silver medalist(s)	Germany	1) Helgard Houben 2) Hannelore Venn; 3) Vroni Lay 4) Gabriele Rost-Brasholz	1:17.14
3rd place, bronze medalist(s)	Great Britain	1) Kathleen Stewart 2) Iris Holder; 3) Anne Dockery 4) Angela Copson	1:18.13

==== W75 4x100 metres relay ====
Pos	Country	Members/Age	Result
1st place, gold medalist(s)	Australia	1) Noreen Parrish 2) Lynne Andrews; 3) Anne Lang 4) Miriam Cudmore	1:18.30

==== W80 4x100 metres relay ====
Pos	Country	Members/Age	Result
1st place, gold medalist(s)	United States	1) Christel Donley 2) Carolyn Langenwalter; 3) Rose Green 4) Jeanne Daprano	1:21.17

=== 4x400 metres relay ===
All relays September 16, 2018

==== W35 4x400 metres relay ====
9 teams

Pos	Country	Members/Age	Result
1st place, gold medalist(s)	Kenya	1) Elizabeth Muthuka 2) Florence Wasike; 3) Georgina Mbinya 4) Nelly Jeptanui	3:58.62
2nd place, silver medalist(s)	Germany	1) Christine Priegelmeir 2) Nina Howorka; 3) Olga Koppen 4) Sinah Florence Hanssler-Hug	3:59.53
3rd place, bronze medalist(s)	Spain	1) Carolina Garcia Garzon 2) Barbara Gonzalez Gonzalez; 3) Nuria Esteve 4) Carmen Lucia Merino Blatnik	4:08.09

==== W40 4x400 metres relay ====
13 teams, 2 heats timed final

Pos	Country	Members/Age	Heat	Result
1st place, gold medalist(s)	United States	1) Rachel Guest 2) Cynthia McNamee; 3) Angela Myers 4) Cynthia Monteleone	2	3:58.45
2nd place, silver medalist(s)	Ireland	1) Jenny Rosen 2) Cynthia McNamee; 3) Catherine Diver 4) Kelly Neely	1	4:10.80
3rd place, bronze medalist(s)	Sweden	1) Anna Bjorkstedt 2) Jenny Rosen; 3) Lena Axelson 4) Jenny Akervall	1	4:11.46

Note, Spain 4:11.47 in heat 2

==== W45 4x400 metres relay ====
8 teams

Pos	Country	Members/Age	Result
1st place, gold medalist(s)	Germany	1) Jutta Bergener 2) Kerstin Drewes; 3) Eva Trost 4) Tatjana Schilling	4:05.96
2nd place, silver medalist(s)	Italy	1) Simona Prunea 2) Paola Tiselli; 3) Maria Costanza Moroni 4) Cristina Sanulli	4:13.13
3rd place, bronze medalist(s)	Spain	1) Emilia Paunica Paunica 2) Isabel Maria Ruiz Serna; 3) Laura Gloria Moneo 4) Mireia Gorju Solsona	4:15.76

==== W50 4x400 metres relay ====
8 teams

Pos	Country	Members/Age	Heat	Result
1st place, gold medalist(s)	Spain	1) Arancha Barroeta 2) Maria Del Carmen Perez Munoz; 3) Esther Colas 4) Maria Carabante	2	4:19.51
2nd place, silver medalist(s)	Australia	1) Jaqualine Bezuidenhout 2) Mandy Mason; 3) Stephanie Noon 4) Julie Brims	2	4:20.07
3rd place, bronze medalist(s)	Great Britain	1) Jacqui Hodgson 2) Jacqueline Musselwhite; 3) Karen Rushton 4) Fiona Palmer	1	4:34.78

==== W55 4x400 metres relay ====
9 teams

Pos	Country	Members/Age	Result
1st place, gold medalist(s)	Great Britain	1) Angela Sonn 2) Christine Feely; 3) Janice Ellacott 4) Virginia Mitchell	4:31.15
2nd place, silver medalist(s)	United States	1) Shemayne Williams 2) Lorraine Jasper; 3) Adriene Allen 4) Kathleen Shook	4:35.60
3rd place, bronze medalist(s)	Germany	1) Marion Hergarten 2) Petra Kauerhof; 3) Christiane Contag 4) Brigitte Heidrich	4:38.74

==== W60 4x400 metres relay ====
9 teams

Pos	Country	Members/Age	Result
1st place, gold medalist(s)	Great Britain	1) Hilary West 2) Helen Godsell; 3) Jane Horder 4) Caroline Powell	4:41.85
2nd place, silver medalist(s)	United States	1) Leandra Funk 2) Tracey Bernett; 3) Coreen Steinbach 4) Lesley Hinz	5:03.81
3rd place, bronze medalist(s)	Australia	1) Carol Bowman 2) Margaret Saunders; 3) Linda McDowell 4) Deborah Drennan	5:14.73

==== W65 4x400 metres relay ====
Pos	Country	Members/Age	Result
1st place, gold medalist(s)	Great Britain	1) Alison Bourgeois 2) Caroline Marler; 3) Rosalind Tabor 4) Joylyn Saunders-Mullins	5:05.83
2nd place, silver medalist(s)	Australia	1) Paula Moorhouse 2) Kathryn Sims; 3) Evelyn Peake 4) Wilma Perkins	5:39.04
3rd place, bronze medalist(s)	Germany	1) Margret Goettnauer 2) Ingeborg Thoma; 3) Hannelore Venn 4) Marion Ertl	5:59.68

==== W70 4x400 metres relay ====
Pos	Country	Members/Age	Result
1st place, gold medalist(s)	Great Britain	1) Patricia Gallagher 2) Pauline Rich; 3) Anne Dockery 4) Angela Copson	6:07.79
2nd place, silver medalist(s)	Australia	1) Anne Lang 2) Irene Davey; 3) Lynne Andrews 4) Marge Allison	6:22.25
3rd place, bronze medalist(s)	Sweden	1) Kristina Carlsson 2) Gunhild Eriksson; 3) Ingegard Eriksson 4) Eva Widelund	7:00.45

==== W80 4x400 metres relay ====
Pos	Country	Members/Age	Result
1st place, gold medalist(s)	United States	1) Rose Green 2) Jeanne Daprano; 3) Carolyn Langenwalter 4) Lynne Hurrell	7:59.18

== Field results ==
=== High Jump ===
Held September 10, 2018

==== W35 High Jump ====
Pos	Athlete	Birthdate	Country	Result
1st place, gold medalist(s)	Raquel Alvarez	13-Jun-1983	Spain	1.75 m (5 ft 8 3/4 in)
2nd place, silver medalist(s)	Marie Christine Plasse	31-May-1981	France	1.61 m (5 ft 3 1/4 in)
3rd place, bronze medalist(s)	Magdolna Kresz	14-Jun-1983	Hungary	1.61 m (5 ft 3 1/4 in)

==== W40 High Jump ====
Pos	Athlete	Birthdate	Country	Result
1st place, gold medalist(s)	Miyuki Fukumoto	04-Jan-1977	Japan	1.73 m (5 ft 8 in)
2nd place, silver medalist(s)	Snezana Kocic	09-Feb-1977	Serbia	1.53 m (5 ft 0 in)
3rd place, bronze medalist(s)	Jennifer Gartmann	04-Apr-1976	Germany	1.50 m (4 ft 11 in)

==== W45 High Jump ====
Pos	Athlete	Birthdate	Country	Result
1st place, gold medalist(s)	Kitty Vadasz	02-Aug-1973	Hungary	1.63 m (5 ft 4 in)
2nd place, silver medalist(s)	Manuela Gross	12-Jul-1971	Germany	1.53 m (5 ft 0 in)
3rd place, bronze medalist(s)	Linda van Berkel	15-Oct-1969	Netherlands	1.50 m (4 ft 11 in)

==== W50 High Jump ====
Pos	Athlete	Birthdate	Country	Result
1st place, gold medalist(s)	Petra Bajeat	06-Mar-1966	France	1.55 m (5 ft 1 in)
2nd place, silver medalist(s)	Monica Buizza	30-Apr-1966	Italy	1.48 m (4 ft 10 1/4 in)
3rd place, bronze medalist(s)	Marcela Barrientos	15-Mar-1965	Chile	1.48 m (4 ft 10 1/4 in)
3rd place, bronze medalist(s)	Neringa Jakstiene	18-Oct-1963	Lithuania	1.45 m (4 ft 9 in)

==== W55 High Jump ====
Pos	Athlete	Birthdate	Country	Result
1st place, gold medalist(s)	Frauke Viebahn	26-Nov-1959	Germany	1.50 m (4 ft 11 in)
2nd place, silver medalist(s)	Kristina Ponton	31-Jan-1963	Sweden	1.46 m (4 ft 9 1/4 in)
3rd place, bronze medalist(s)	Francesca Iuri	24-Feb-1961	Italy	1.40 m (4 ft 7 in)

==== W60 High Jump ====
Pos	Athlete	Birthdate	Country	Result
1st place, gold medalist(s)	Jutta Pfannkuche	..-..-1958	Germany	1.39 m (4 ft 6 1/2 in)
2nd place, silver medalist(s)	Carmen Karg	19-Aug-1954	Germany	1.37 m (4 ft 5 3/4 in)
2nd place, silver medalist(s)	Conceicao Aparecida Geremias	23-Jul-1956	Brazil	1.37 m (4 ft 5 3/4 in)

==== W65 High Jump ====
Pos	Athlete	Birthdate	Country	Result
1st place, gold medalist(s)	Lluisa Casanovas Gaset	25-Apr-1952	Spain	1.20 m (3 ft 11 in)
2nd place, silver medalist(s)	Sue Yeomans	16-Mar-1953	Great Britain	1.20 m (3 ft 11 in)
3rd place, bronze medalist(s)	Ursula Schmidt	03-Jan-1952	Germany	1.16 m (3 ft 9 1/2 in)

==== W70 High Jump ====
Pos	Athlete	Birthdate	Country	Result
1st place, gold medalist(s)	Annelies Steekelenburg	12-Apr-1948	Netherlands	1.22 m (4 ft 0 in)
2nd place, silver medalist(s)	Margaret Taylor	06-Apr-1948	Australia	1.20 m (3 ft 11 in)
3rd place, bronze medalist(s)	Ingeborg Zorzi	25-Mar-1948	Italy	1.18 m (3 ft 10 1/4 in)

==== W75 High Jump ====
Pos	Athlete	Birthdate	Country	Result
1st place, gold medalist(s)	Carol LaFayette-Boyd	12-May-1942	Canada	1.24 m (4 ft 3/4 in) WR
2nd place, silver medalist(s)	Marianne Maier	25-Dec-1942	Austria	1.07 m (3 ft 6 in)
3rd place, bronze medalist(s)	Erika Springmann	15-Feb-1943	Germany	0.98 m (3 ft 2 1/2 in)

==== W80 High Jump ====
Pos	Athlete	Birthdate	Country	Result
1st place, gold medalist(s)	Christiane Schmalbruch	08-Jan-1937	Germany	1.07 m (3 ft 6 in)
2nd place, silver medalist(s)	Christel Donley	20-Jan-1935	United States	1.00 m (3 ft 3 1/4 in)
3rd place, bronze medalist(s)	Brita Kiesheyer	09-Nov-1937	Germany	0.88 m (2 ft 10 1/2 in)

=== Pole Vault ===
==== W35 Pole Vault ====
September 12, 2018

Pos	Athlete	Birthdate	Country	Result
1st place, gold medalist(s)	Marta Cot Canto	14-Nov-1981	Spain	3.54 m (11 ft 7 1/4 in)
2nd place, silver medalist(s)	Julie Elias	09-Apr-1981	France	3.30 m (10 ft 9 3/4 in)
2nd place, silver medalist(s)	Caroline Parkinson	31-Jul-1983	Great Britain	3.10 m (10 ft 2 in)

==== W40 Pole Vault ====
September 12, 2018

Pos	Athlete	Birthdate	Country	Result
1st place, gold medalist(s)	Ivona Jerkovic	20-Sep-1976	Croatia	3.50 m (11 ft 5 3/4 in)
2nd place, silver medalist(s)	Barbara Capellini	11-Sep-1976	Italy	3.10 m (10 ft 2 in)
3rd place, bronze medalist(s)	Ida-Marie Strydom	28-Sep-1975	South Africa	3.10 m (10 ft 2 in)

==== W45 Pole Vault ====
September 12, 2018

Pos	Athlete	Birthdate	Country	Result
1st place, gold medalist(s)	Irie Hill	16-Jan-1969	Great Britain	3.40 m (11 ft 1 3/4 in)
2nd place, silver medalist(s)	Marja Eskelinen	26-Feb-1969	Finland	3.00 m (9 ft 10 in)
3rd place, bronze medalist(s)	Liliana Bringas Putman	08-Feb-1971	Peru	2.90 m (9 ft 6 in)

==== W50 Pole Vault ====
September 12, 2018

Pos	Athlete	Birthdate	Country	Result
1st place, gold medalist(s)	Montserrat Prat Grau	25-Apr-1966	Spain	2.75 m (9 ft 1/4 in)
2nd place, silver medalist(s)	Marisa Marcotegui	09-Jun-1967	Spain	2.75 m (9 ft 1/4 in)
3rd place, bronze medalist(s)	Geraldine Finegan	14-Oct-1965	Belgium	2.30 m (7 ft 6 1/2 in)

==== W55 Pole Vault ====
September 9, 2018

Pos	Athlete	Birthdate	Country	Result
1st place, gold medalist(s)	Brigitte van de Kamp	15-Jun-1960	Netherlands	2.90 m (9 ft 6 in)
2nd place, silver medalist(s)	Carla Forcellini	07-Nov-1959	Italy	2.85 m (9 ft 4 in)
3rd place, bronze medalist(s)	Ana Otero Terron	08-Mar-1961	Spain	2.20 m (7 ft 2 1/2 in)

==== W60 Pole Vault ====
September 9, 2018

Pos	Athlete	Birthdate	Country	Result
1st place, gold medalist(s)	Dawn Hartigan	13-Nov-1956	Australia	2.40 m (7 ft 10 1/4 in)
2nd place, silver medalist(s)	Rita Hanscom	11-May-1954	United States	2.20 m (7 ft 2 1/2 in)
3rd place, bronze medalist(s)	Anne Nurmi	11-Jul-1958	Finland	2.00 m (6 ft 6 1/2 in)

==== W65 Pole Vault ====
September 12, 2018

Pos	Athlete	Birthdate	Country	Result
1st place, gold medalist(s)	Sue Yeomans	16-Mar-1953	Great Britain	2.50 m (8 ft 2 1/4 in)
2nd place, silver medalist(s)	Ute Ritte	21-Mar-1952	Germany	2.50 m (8 ft 2 1/4 in)
2nd place, silver medalist(s)	Wilma Perkins	05-Sep-1949	Australia	2.00 m (6 ft 6 1/2 in)

==== W70 Pole Vault ====
September 12, 2018

Pos	Athlete	Birthdate	Country	Result
1st place, gold medalist(s)	Birgitta Uppgarden	18-Apr-1948	Sweden	2.10 m (6 ft 10 1/2 in)
2nd place, silver medalist(s)	Mirtha Perez	27-Apr-1948	Chile	1.90 m (6 ft 2 3/4 in)

==== W75 Pole Vault ====
September 12, 2018

Pos	Athlete	Birthdate	Country	Result
1st place, gold medalist(s)	Catherine Radle	01-Aug-1943	United States	1.60 m (5 ft 2 3/4 in)

=== Long Jump ===
==== W35 Long Jump ====
September 9, 2018

Pos	Athlete	Birthdate	Country	Result Wind
1st place, gold medalist(s)	Melissa Foster	08-Sep-1978	Australia	5.46 m (17 ft 10 3/4 in) -0.5
2nd place, silver medalist(s)	Lenka Brazdilova	09-Jan-1982	Czech Republic	5.38 m (17 ft 7 3/4 in) -1.1
3rd place, bronze medalist(s)	Magdolna Kresz	14-Jun-1983	Hungary	5.26 m (17 ft 3 in) -1.1

==== W40 Long Jump ====
24 athletes. Two flights and final on September 9, 2018

Pos	Athlete	Birthdate	Country	Result Wind
1st place, gold medalist(s)	Sandra Kramer	01-Sep-1977	Germany	5.72 m (18 ft 9 in) 0.0
2nd place, silver medalist(s)	Joanne Frost	23-Jun-1978	Great Britain	5.33 m (17 ft 5 3/4 in) -0.7
3rd place, bronze medalist(s)	Eugenie Reche-Boncoeur	22-Aug-1978	France	5.34 m (17 ft 6 in) +1.0

==== W45 Long Jump ====
23 athletes. One flight and final on September 11, 2018

Pos	Athlete	Birthdate	Country	Result Wind
1st place, gold medalist(s)	Maria Costanza Moroni	08-Apr-1969	Italy	5.20 m (17 ft 1/2 in) +0.0
2nd place, silver medalist(s)	Lenorë Lambert	10-Oct-1969	Australia	5.01 m (16 ft 5 in) 0.0
3rd place, bronze medalist(s)	Tatjana Schilling	05-Oct-1970	Germany	4.99 m (16 ft 4 1/4 in) +0.0

==== W50 Long Jump ====
33 athletes. Two flights and final on September 11, 2018

Pos	Athlete	Birthdate	Country	Result Wind
1st place, gold medalist(s)	Petra Bajeat	06-Mar-1966	France	5.33 m (17 ft 5 3/4 in) -1.9
2nd place, silver medalist(s)	Renata Novosel	28-Nov-1967	Croatia	5.05 m (16 ft 6 3/4 in) -1.4
3rd place, bronze medalist(s)	Urte Alisch	12-Aug-1967	Germany	4.89 m (16 ft 1/2 in) -1.4

==== W55 Long Jump ====
28 athletes. Two flights and final on September 11, 2018

Pos	Athlete	Birthdate	Country	Result Wind
1st place, gold medalist(s)	Joy Upshaw	24-Feb-1961	United States	4.58 m (15 ft 1/4 in)* +0.8
2nd place, silver medalist(s)	Frauke Viebahn	26-Nov-1959	Germany	4.58 m (15 ft 1/4 in)* +0.0
3rd place, bronze medalist(s)	Melanie Garland	24-Dec-1962	Great Britain	4.53 m (14 ft 10 1/4 in) +0.5

- Upshaw wins on tiebreaker, 2nd best jump 4.54 to Viebahn 4.49

==== W60 Long Jump ====
23 athletes. Two flights and final on September 11, 2018

Pos	Athlete	Birthdate	Country	Result Wind
1st place, gold medalist(s)	Loles Vives Jorba	13-Sep-1957	Spain	4.36 m (14 ft 3 1/2 in)w -1.4
2nd place, silver medalist(s)	Silvia Bloedorn	22-Dec-1956	Germany	4.30 m (14 ft 1 1/4 in) +0.8
3rd place, bronze medalist(s)	Anna-Liisa Salminen	13-Jul-1957	Finland	4.23 m (13 ft 10 1/2 in) -1.8

==== W65 Long Jump ====
September 11, 2018

Pos	Athlete	Birthdate	Country	Result Wind
1st place, gold medalist(s)	Ute Ritte	21-Mar-1952	Germany	3.81 m (12 ft 6 in)w -2.4
2nd place, silver medalist(s)	Linda Cohn	07-Dec-1952	United States	3.78 m (12 ft 4 3/4 in) +0.1
3rd place, bronze medalist(s)	Toini Nousiainen	21-Aug-1952	Finland	3.77 m (12 ft 4 1/4 in) +0.8

==== W70 Long Jump ====
September 11, 2018

Pos	Athlete	Birthdate	Country	Result Wind
1st place, gold medalist(s)	Margaret Taylor	06-Apr-1948	Australia	3.37 m (11 ft 1/2 in) -0.4
2nd place, silver medalist(s)	Margaret Crooke	22-Apr-1947	New Zealand	3.26 m (10 ft 8 1/4 in) 0.0
3rd place, bronze medalist(s)	Terhi Kokkonen	13-Jun-1947	Finland	3.19 m (10 ft 5 1/2 in) 0.0

==== W75 Long Jump ====
September 11, 2018

Pos	Athlete	Birthdate	Country	Result Wind
1st place, gold medalist(s)	Carol LaFayette-Boyd	17-May-1942	Canada	3.78 m (12 ft 4 3/4 in) -1.7
2nd place, silver medalist(s)	Marianne Maier	25-Dec-1942	Austria	3.29 m (10 ft 9 1/2 in) -0.4
3rd place, bronze medalist(s)	Kerstin Nilsson	10-Sep-1942	Sweden	3.01 m (9 ft 10 1/2 in) -1.1

==== W80 Long Jump ====
September 11, 2018

Pos	Athlete	Birthdate	Country	Result Wind
1st place, gold medalist(s)	Christiane Schmalbruch	08-Jan-1937	Germany	3.18 m (10 ft 5 in) -0.9
2nd place, silver medalist(s)	Miriam Cudmore	..-Nov-1937	Australia	2.95 m (9 ft 8 in) -1.2
3rd place, bronze medalist(s)	Leontine Vitola	24-Dec-1937	Latvia	2.83 m (9 ft 3 1/4 in) -0.4

Vitola took 3rd on tiebreaker, Shiu-Yu Lin Pan Chinese Taipei also jumped 2.83, 2nd best jump 2.78 to 2.69

==== W85 Long Jump ====
September 11, 2018

Pos	Athlete	Birthdate	Country	Result
1st place, gold medalist(s)	Rozka Stancheva	02-May-1932	Bulgaria	2.12 m (6 ft 11 1/4 in) 0.0
2nd place, silver medalist(s)	Clasina Van der Veeken	05-Aug-1931	New Zealand	1.80 m (5 ft 10 3/4 in) -1.9

==== W90 Long Jump ====
September 11, 2018

Pos	Athlete	Birthdate	Country	Result
1st place, gold medalist(s)	Senni Sopanen	11-Sep-1927	Finland	1.30 m (4 ft 3 in) 0.0

=== Triple Jump ===
Held September 12, 2018

==== W35 Triple Jump ====
Pos	Athlete	Birthdate	Country	Result Wind
1st place, gold medalist(s)	Valentina Morigi	30-Jan-1982	Italy	11.69 m (38 ft 4 in) -1.5
2nd place, silver medalist(s)	Lenka Brazdilova	09-Jan-1982	Czech Republic	11.68 m (38 ft 3 3/4 in) -2.6
3rd place, bronze medalist(s)	Melissa Foster	08-Sep-1978	Australia	11.52 m (37 ft 9 1/2 in) -3.0

==== W40 Triple Jump ====
Pos	Athlete	Birthdate	Country	Result Wind
1st place, gold medalist(s)	Sandra Kramer	01-Sep-1977	Germany	12.42 m (40 ft 8 3/4 in) -1.6
2nd place, silver medalist(s)	Jaroslava Vaneckova	08-Jun-1977	Czech Republic	11.26 m (36 ft 11 1/4 in) 0.0
3rd place, bronze medalist(s)	Michelle Hastick-Cowell	10-Sep-1973	Canada	11.00 m (36 ft 1 in) -0.6

==== W45 Triple Jump ====
Pos	Athlete	Birthdate	Country	Result Wind
1st place, gold medalist(s)	Andrea Szirbucz	07-May-1972	Hungary	11.87 m (38 ft 11 1/4 in) -1.1
2nd place, silver medalist(s)	Dagmar Suhling	15-Sep-1969	Germany	10.58 m (34 ft 8 1/2 in) -1.8
3rd place, bronze medalist(s)	Eva Maria Gadea Solera	08-Sep-1971	Spain	10.39 m (34 ft 1 in) -0.1

==== W50 Triple Jump ====
Pos	Athlete	Birthdate	Country	Result Wind
1st place, gold medalist(s)	Neringa Jakstiene	18-Oct-1963	Lithuania	10.86 m (35 ft 7 1/2 in) -2.0
2nd place, silver medalist(s)	Kaori Nishizawa	18-Jul-1967	Japan	10.32 m (33 ft 10 1/4 in) -0.7
3rd place, bronze medalist(s)	Valentyna Krepkina	05-Sep-1965	Ukraine	10.08 m (33 ft 3/4 in) -1.6

==== W55 Triple Jump ====
Pos	Athlete	Birthdate	Country	Result Wind
1st place, gold medalist(s)	Reeth Abraham	28-Sep-1962	India	10.18 m (33 ft 4 3/4 in) -1.1
2nd place, silver medalist(s)	Alicia Hernandez Martinez	20-Feb-1961	Spain	10.16 m (33 ft 4 in) 0.0
3rd place, bronze medalist(s)	Janice Pryce	02-Sep-1959	Great Britain	9.46 m (31 ft 1/4 in) 0.0

==== W60 Triple Jump ====
Pos	Athlete	Birthdate	Country	Result Wind
1st place, gold medalist(s)	Conceicao Aparecida Geremias	23-Jul-1956	Brazil	10.01 m (32 ft 10 in) 0.0
2nd place, silver medalist(s)	Anna-Liisa Salminen	13-Jul-1957	Finland	9.22 m (30 ft 2 3/4 in) 0.0
3rd place, bronze medalist(s)	Irenilta Nunes Pereira	03-Jul-1955	Brazil	8.69 m (28 ft 6 in) +0.3

==== W65 Triple Jump ====
Pos	Athlete	Birthdate	Country	Result Wind
1st place, gold medalist(s)	Akiko Ohinata	14-Dec-1949	Japan	9.03 m (29 ft 7 1/2 in) -3.4
2nd place, silver medalist(s)	Maria Grazia Rafti	10-Dec-1951	Italy	7.97 m (26 ft 1 3/4 in) -2.7
3rd place, bronze medalist(s)	Linda Cohn	07-Dec-1952	United States	7.93 m (26 ft 0 in) -3.6

==== W70 Triple Jump ====
Pos	Athlete	Birthdate	Country	Result Wind
1st place, gold medalist(s)	Margaret Taylor	06-Apr-1948	Australia	7.80 m (25 ft 7 in) -3.0
2nd place, silver medalist(s)	Terhi Kokkonen	13-Jun-1947	Finland	7.51 m (24 ft 7 1/2 in) -1.3
3rd place, bronze medalist(s)	Margaret Crooke	22-Apr-1947	New Zealand	7.45 m (24 ft 5 1/4 in) -2.0

==== W75 Triple Jump ====
Pos	Athlete	Birthdate	Country	Result Wind
1st place, gold medalist(s)	Carol LaFayette-Boyd	17-May-1942	Canada	7.98 m (26 ft 2 in) -1.6
2nd place, silver medalist(s)	Erika Springmann	15-Feb-1943	Germany	6.86 m (22 ft 6 in) -2.0
3rd place, bronze medalist(s)	Iris Holder	24-Feb-1941	Great Britain	5.98 m (19 ft 7 1/4 in) -0.8

==== W80 Triple Jump ====
Pos	Athlete	Birthdate	Country	Result Wind
1st place, gold medalist(s)	Christiane Schmalbruch	08-Jan-1937	Germany	6.85 m (22 ft 5 1/2 in) -0.1
2nd place, silver medalist(s)	Miriam Cudmore	..-Nov-1937	Australia	6.36 m (20 ft 10 1/4 in) -1.5
3rd place, bronze medalist(s)	Shiu-Yu Lin Pan	21-Jan-1937	Chinese Taipei	5.83 m (19 ft 1 1/2 in) -1.4

==== W85 Triple Jump ====
Pos	Athlete	Birthdate	Country	Result Wind
1st place, gold medalist(s)	Clasina Van der Veeken	05-Aug-1931	New Zealand	4.21 m (13 ft 9 1/2 in) 0.0

==== W90 Triple Jump ====
Pos	Athlete	Birthdate	Country	Result
1st place, gold medalist(s)	Senni Sopanen	11-Sep-1927	Finland	3.40 m (11 ft 1 3/4 in) -1.5

=== Shot Put ===
==== W35 Shot Put ====
September 5, 2018

Pos	Athlete	Birthdate	Country	Result
1st place, gold medalist(s)	Maria Slok Hansen	08-Jan-1983	Denmark	15.53 m (50 ft 11 1/4 in)
2nd place, silver medalist(s)	Jana Karnikova	14-Feb-1981	Czech Republic	15.01 m (49 ft 2 3/4 in)
3rd place, bronze medalist(s)	Maria Lorena Aguilar Moreno	11-Jul-1979	Spain	13.39 m (43 ft 11 in)

==== W40 Shot Put ====
September 5, 2018

Pos	Athlete	Birthdate	Country	Result
1st place, gold medalist(s)	Vera Yepimashka	10-Jul-1976	Belarus	13.50 m (44 ft 3 1/4 in)
2nd place, silver medalist(s)	Amaia Dublang	28-Dec-1976	Spain	13.17 m (43 ft 2 1/2 in)
3rd place, bronze medalist(s)	Peduru Arachchige Priyangika Kumari	25-Aug-1978	Sri Lanka	12.38 m (40 ft 7 1/4 in)

==== W45 Shot Put ====
28 athletes, 2 flights and final held on September 5, 2018

Pos	Athlete	Birthdate	Country	Result
1st place, gold medalist(s)	Camille Cayet	26-Jan-1971	France	10.83 m (35 ft 6 1/4 in)
2nd place, silver medalist(s)	Yvonne Steinfurth	09-Apr-1971	Germany	10.62 m (34 ft 10 in)
3rd place, bronze medalist(s)	Itziar Fernandez De Mendiola	12-Oct-1972	Spain	10.20 m (33 ft 5 1/2 in)

==== W50 Shot Put ====
28 athletes, 2 flights and final held on September 5, 2018

Pos	Athlete	Birthdate	Country	Result
1st place, gold medalist(s)	Jana Muller Schmidt	23-Oct-1964	Germany	14.54 m (47 ft 8 1/4 in)
2nd place, silver medalist(s)	Svitlana Sorochuk	29-May-1967	Ukraine	14.18 m (46 ft 6 1/4 in)
3rd place, bronze medalist(s)	Claudia Kodel	22-Jun-1968	Germany	13.58 m (44 ft 6 1/2 in)

==== W55 Shot Put ====
31 athletes, 2 flights and final held on September 5, 2018

Pos	Athlete	Birthdate	Country	Result
1st place, gold medalist(s)	Lea Vahter	07-Jul-1961	Estonia	12.25 m (40 ft 2 1/4 in)
2nd place, silver medalist(s)	Carmen Grell	11-Aug-1962	Germany	12.20 m (40 ft 1/4 in)
3rd place, bronze medalist(s)	Alexandra Marghieva	27-Jun-1959	Moldova	11.95 m (39 ft 2 1/4 in)

==== W60 Shot Put ====
28 athletes, 2 flights and final held on September 5, 2018

Pos	Athlete	Birthdate	Country	Result
1st place, gold medalist(s)	Conceicao Aparecida Geremias	23-Jul-1956	Brazil	12.10 m (39 ft 8 1/4 in)*
2nd place, silver medalist(s)	Tiny Hellendoorn	25-Mar-1955	Netherlands	11.54 m (37 ft 10 1/4 in)
3rd place, bronze medalist(s)	Maria Cotolupenco	02-Aug-1955	Moldova	11.12 m (36 ft 5 3/4 in)

IAAF rule 187-4d was noted in the results for Geremias. No indication she was disqualified for an offense. Rule 187-4d involves spreading a substance on hand or ring to gain an advantage

==== W65 Shot Put ====
September 5, 2018

Pos	Athlete	Birthdate	Country	Result
1st place, gold medalist(s)	Brigitte Bonadt	08-Oct-1951	Germany	11.60 m (38 ft 1/2 in)
2nd place, silver medalist(s)	Hermine Bajare	27-Jan-1952	Latvia	10.80 m (35 ft 5 in)
3rd place, bronze medalist(s)	Inara Rozena	25-Aug-1952	Latvia	10.75 m (35 ft 3 in)

==== W70 Shot Put ====
September 5, 2018

Pos	Athlete	Birthdate	Country	Result
1st place, gold medalist(s)	Maria Terezia Gosztolai	13-Sep-1947	Hungary	9.44 m (30 ft 11 1/2 in)
2nd place, silver medalist(s)	Jarmila Klimešová	05-Nov-1947	Czech Republic	9.05 m (29 ft 8 1/4 in)
3rd place, bronze medalist(s)	Grete Rivenes	18-Mar-1948	Norway	8.84 m (29 ft 0 in)

==== W75 Shot Put ====
September 4, 2018

Pos	Athlete	Birthdate	Country	Result
1st place, gold medalist(s)	Marianne Maier	25-Dec-1942	Austria	12.12 m (39 ft 9 in) WR
2nd place, silver medalist(s)	Maija Jakobsone	06-May-1943	Latvia	10.12 m (33 ft 2 1/4 in)
3rd place, bronze medalist(s)	Genevieve Cathalau	08-Sep-1939	France	10.06 m (33 ft 0 in)

==== W80 Shot Put ====
September 4, 2018

Pos	Athlete	Birthdate	Country	Result
1st place, gold medalist(s)	Evaun Williams	19-Dec-1937	Great Britain	10.07 m (33 ft 1/4 in) WR
2nd place, silver medalist(s)	Tserendolgor Tumurbat	02-May-1938	Mongolia	9.25 m (30 ft 4 in)
3rd place, bronze medalist(s)	Sumiko Yamakawa Imoto	01-Mar-1938	Brazil	9.19 m (30 ft 1 3/4 in)

==== W85 Shot Put ====
September 4, 2018

Pos	Athlete	Birthdate	Country	Result
1st place, gold medalist(s)	Maria Luisa Gonzalez Ortiz	05-Jul-1933	Spain	5.09 m (16 ft 8 1/4 in)
2nd place, silver medalist(s)	Clasina Van der Veeken	05-Aug-1931	New Zealand	5.02 m (16 ft 5 1/2 in)
3rd place, bronze medalist(s)	Victor Daisy	17-Jul-1931	India	4.61 m (15 ft 1 1/4 in)

==== W90 Shot Put ====
September 4, 2018

Pos	Athlete	Birthdate	Country	Result
1st place, gold medalist(s)	Julia Huapaya	01-Jan-1927	Peru	4.86 m (15 ft 11 1/4 in)
2nd place, silver medalist(s)	Senni Sopanen	11-Sep-1927	Finland	4.23 m (13 ft 10 1/2 in)

==== W95 Shot Put ====
September 4, 2018

Pos	Athlete	Birthdate	Country	Result
1st place, gold medalist(s)	Nora Kutti	09-Oct-1922	Estonia	4.44 m (14 ft 6 3/4 in)

=== Discus Throw ===
==== W35 Discus Throw ====
September 10, 2018

Pos	Athlete	Birthdate	Country	Result
1st place, gold medalist(s)	Sabine Rumpf	18-Mar-1983	Germany	52.23 m (171 ft 4 in)
2nd place, silver medalist(s)	Sibylle Retour	25-Apr-1981	France	46.62 m (152 ft 11 in)
3rd place, bronze medalist(s)	Maria Slok Hansen	08-Jan-1983	Denmark	46.57 m (152 ft 9 in)

==== W40 Discus Throw ====
September 10, 2018

Pos	Athlete	Birthdate	Country	Result
1st place, gold medalist(s)	Lena Bjork	01-Jan-1976	Sweden	41.87 m (137 ft 4 in)
2nd place, silver medalist(s)	Bianca Overkamp	17-Mar-1975	Germany	41.02 m (134 ft 6 in)
3rd place, bronze medalist(s)	Vera Yepimashka	10-Jul-1976	Belarus	39.25 m (128 ft 9 in)

==== W45 Discus Throw ====
23 athletes, 2 flights and final held on September 10, 2018

Pos	Athlete	Birthdate	Country	Result
1st place, gold medalist(s)	Alice Matějková	11-Jan-1969	Spain	44.45 m (145 ft 10 in)
2nd place, silver medalist(s)	Latifa Souiba Allam	23-Feb-1970	Morocco	43.57 m (142 ft 11 in)
3rd place, bronze medalist(s)	Bettina Daniela Schardt	12-Apr-1972	Germany	40.82 m (133 ft 11 in)

==== W50 Discus Throw ====
34 athletes, 2 flights and final held on September 10, 2018

Pos	Athlete	Birthdate	Country	Result
1st place, gold medalist(s)	Vivian Krafft Christensen	15-Jan-1966	Denmark	41.66 m (136 ft 8 in)
2nd place, silver medalist(s)	Malgorzata Krzyzan	13-May-1968	Poland	40.89 m (134 ft 1 in)
3rd place, bronze medalist(s)	Svitlana Sorochuk	29-May-1967	Ukraine	38.32 m (125 ft 8 in)

==== W55 Discus Throw ====
34 athletes, 2 flights and final held on September 10, 2018

Pos	Athlete	Birthdate	Country	Result
1st place, gold medalist(s)	Eha Rünne	25-May-1963	Estonia	40.90 m (134 ft 2 in)
2nd place, silver medalist(s)	Jorunn Tangen Hole	17-Jun-1961	Norway	40.25 m (132 ft 0 in)
3rd place, bronze medalist(s)	Lea Vahter	07-Jul-1961	Estonia	38.57 m (126 ft 6 in)

==== W60 Discus Throw ====
35 athletes, 2 flights and final held on September 10, 2018

Pos	Athlete	Birthdate	Country	Result
1st place, gold medalist(s)	Carol Finsrud	20-Feb-1957	United States	40.73 m (133 ft 7 in)
2nd place, silver medalist(s)	Maria Cotolupenco	02-Aug-1955	Moldova	36.73 m (120 ft 6 in)
3rd place, bronze medalist(s)	Tiny Hellendoorn	25-Mar-1955	Netherlands	33.40 m (109 ft 6 in)

==== W65 Discus Throw ====
26 athletes, 2 flights and final held on September 9, 2018

Pos	Athlete	Birthdate	Country	Result
1st place, gold medalist(s)	Hermine Bajare	27-Jan-1952	Latvia	30.32 m (99 ft 5 in)
2nd place, silver medalist(s)	Inara Rozena	25-Aug-1952	Latvia	28.16 m (92 ft 4 in)
3rd place, bronze medalist(s)	Brigitte Bonadt	08-Oct-1951	Germany	27.73 m (90 ft 11 in)

==== W70 Discus Throw ====
23 athletes, 2 flights and final held on September 9, 2018

Pos	Athlete	Birthdate	Country	Result
1st place, gold medalist(s)	Maria Terezia Gosztolai	13-Sep-1947	Hungary	26.14 m (85 ft 9 in)
2nd place, silver medalist(s)	Inge Faldager	08-Jan-1948	Denmark	25.03 m (82 ft 1 in)
3rd place, bronze medalist(s)	Monika Hedderich	..-..-1947	Germany	24.87 m (81 ft 7 in)

==== W75 Discus Throw ====
25 athletes, 2 flights and final held on September 9, 2018

Pos	Athlete	Birthdate	Country	Result
1st place, gold medalist(s)	Maija Jakobsone	06-May-1943	Latvia	29.09 m (95 ft 5 in)
2nd place, silver medalist(s)	Tomoko Kanari	03-Feb-1941	Japan	25.99 m (85 ft 3 in)
3rd place, bronze medalist(s)	Maria Luisa Fancello	15-Feb-1943	Italy	25.10 m (82 ft 4 in)

==== W80 Discus Throw ====
September 9, 2018

Pos	Athlete	Birthdate	Country	Result
1st place, gold medalist(s)	Sumiko Yamakawa Imoto	01-Mar-1938	Brazil	23.74 m (77 ft 10 in)
2nd place, silver medalist(s)	Evaun Williams	19-Dec-1937	Great Britain	22.23 m (72 ft 11 in)
3rd place, bronze medalist(s)	Tserendolgor Tumurbat	02-May-1938	Mongolia	20.63 m (67 ft 8 in)

==== W85 Discus Throw ====
September 9, 2018

Pos	Athlete	Birthdate	Country	Result
1st place, gold medalist(s)	Ruth Baumann	15-Sep-1931	Germany	12.49 m (40 ft 11 in)
2nd place, silver medalist(s)	Rozka Stancheva	02-May-1932	Bulgaria	11.88 m (38 ft 11 in)
3rd place, bronze medalist(s)	Maria Luisa Gonzalez Ortiz	05-Jul-1933	Spain	10.75 m (35 ft 3 in)

==== W90 Discus Throw ====
September 9, 2018

Pos	Athlete	Birthdate	Country	Result
1st place, gold medalist(s)	Julia Huapaya	01-Jan-1927	Peru	12.18 m (39 ft 11 in)

==== W95 Discus Throw ====
September 9, 2018

Pos	Athlete	Birthdate	Country	Result
1st place, gold medalist(s)	Nora Kutti	09-Oct-1922	Estonia	10.08 m (33 ft 0 in)

=== Hammer Throw ===
==== W35 Hammer throw ====
September 6, 2018

Pos	Athlete	Birthdate	Country	Result
1st place, gold medalist(s)	Vânia Silva	08-Jun-1980	Portugal	56.72 m (186 ft 1 in)
2nd place, silver medalist(s)	Rebecka Kvist	17-Feb-1983	Sweden	51.48 m (168 ft 10 in)
3rd place, bronze medalist(s)	Dan Wang	07-Jul-1982	China	50.28 m (164 ft 11 in)

==== W40 Hammer throw ====
September 6, 2018

Pos	Athlete	Birthdate	Country	Result
1st place, gold medalist(s)	Byrony Glass	31-Mar-1977	Australia	46.76 m (153 ft 4 in)
2nd place, silver medalist(s)	Violeta Guzmán	14-May-1977	Mexico	46.14 m (151 ft 4 in)
3rd place, bronze medalist(s)	Giannoula Panavoglou	09-May-1977	Greece	42.33 m (138 ft 10 in)

==== W45 Hammer throw ====
22 athletes, 1 flight and final held on September 6, 2018

Pos	Athlete	Birthdate	Country	Result
1st place, gold medalist(s)	Betina Gabler	22-Aug-1971	Spain	46.76 m (153 ft 4 in)
2nd place, silver medalist(s)	Maria Eugenia Villamizar Amado	30-Aug-1970	Colombia	43.91 m (144 ft 0 in)
3rd place, bronze medalist(s)	Bettina Daniela Schardt	12-Apr-1972	Germany	42.93 m (140 ft 10 in)

==== W50 Hammer throw ====
20 athletes, 1 flight and final held on September 4, 2018

Pos	Athlete	Birthdate	Country	Result
1st place, gold medalist(s)	Silke Finkbeiner	20-Jul-1966	Germany	46.80 m (153 ft 6 in)
2nd place, silver medalist(s)	Heleen Knobel	22-Jun-1965	South Africa	45.72 m (150 ft 0 in)
3rd place, bronze medalist(s)	Janet Smith	07-Oct-1964	Great Britain	43.03 m (141 ft 2 in)

==== W55 Hammer throw ====
30 athletes, 2 flights and final held on September 6, 2018

Pos	Athlete	Birthdate	Country	Result
1st place, gold medalist(s)	Connie Hodel	13-Apr-1963	Switzerland	40.90 m (134 ft 2 in)
2nd place, silver medalist(s)	Erika Fandrich	30-Oct-1961	Germany	40.25 m (132 ft 0 in)
3rd place, bronze medalist(s)	Ingrid van Dijk	19-May-1962	Netherlands	38.57 m (126 ft 6 in)

==== W60 Hammer throw ====
23 athletes, 1 flight and final held on September 6, 2018

Pos	Athlete	Birthdate	Country	Result
1st place, gold medalist(s)	Carol Finsrud	20-Feb-1957	United States	43.42 m (142 ft 5 in)
2nd place, silver medalist(s)	Tiny Hellendoorn	25-Mar-1955	Netherlands	37.24 m (122 ft 2 in)
3rd place, bronze medalist(s)	Liisa Makitorma	06-Jun-1957	Finland	36.64 m (120 ft 2 in)

==== W65 Hammer throw ====
27 athletes, 2 flights and final held on September 6, 2018

Pos	Athlete	Birthdate	Country	Result
1st place, gold medalist(s)	Eva Nohl	27-Nov-1948	Germany	38.35 m (125 ft 9 in)
2nd place, silver medalist(s)	Margarethe Tomanek	20-Jul-1949	Belgium	33.11 m (108 ft 7 in)
3rd place, bronze medalist(s)	Jarmila Longauerova	21-Oct-1950	Slovenia	32.23 m (105 ft 8 in)

==== W70 Hammer throw ====
September 6, 2018

Pos	Athlete	Birthdate	Country	Result
1st place, gold medalist(s)	Inge Faldager	08-Jan-1948	Denmark	30.41 m (99 ft 9 in)
2nd place, silver medalist(s)	Grete Rivenes	18-Mar-1948	Norway	27.83 m (91 ft 3 in)
3rd place, bronze medalist(s)	Kirsten Onsberg	22-Jun-1944	Denmark	25.83 m (84 ft 8 in)

==== W75 Hammer throw ====
20 athletes, 1 flight and final held on September 5, 2018

Pos	Athlete	Birthdate	Country	Result
1st place, gold medalist(s)	Janice Lorraine Davies Banens	20-Oct-1941	Australia	33.17 m (108 ft 9 in)
2nd place, silver medalist(s)	Maria Luisa Fancello	15-Feb-1943	Italy	32.66 m (107 ft 1 in)
3rd place, bronze medalist(s)	Patricia Hill	03-Sep-1940	Great Britain	26.70 m (87 ft 7 in)

==== W80 Hammer throw ====
September 5, 2018

Pos	Athlete	Birthdate	Country	Result
1st place, gold medalist(s)	Evaun Williams	19-Dec-1937	Great Britain	35.16 m (115 ft 4 in) WR
2nd place, silver medalist(s)	Sumiko Yamakawa Imoto	01-Mar-1938	Brazil	24.03 m (78 ft 10 in)
3rd place, bronze medalist(s)	Elsbeth Padia	05-Jul-1938	United States	23.23 m (76 ft 2 in)

==== W85 Hammer throw ====
September 5, 2018

Pos	Athlete	Birthdate	Country	Result
1st place, gold medalist(s)	Clasina Van der Veeken	05-Aug-1931	New Zealand	15.61 m (51 ft 2 in)

==== W90 Hammer throw ====
September 5, 2018

Pos	Athlete	Birthdate	Country	Result
1st place, gold medalist(s)	Julia Huapaya	01-Jan-1927	Peru	19.62 m (64 ft 4 in)

=== Javelin Throw ===
==== W35 Javelin Throw ====
15 athletes, 1 flight and final held on September 11, 2018

Pos	Athlete	Birthdate	Country	Result
1st place, gold medalist(s)	Mercedes Chilla Lopez	19-May-1980	Spain	47.38 m (155 ft 5 in)
2nd place, silver medalist(s)	Wilma Jansen	29-Oct-1980	Germany	44.62 m (146 ft 4 in)
3rd place, bronze medalist(s)	Margreet Takken	04-Mar-1979	Netherlands	39.89 m (130 ft 10 in)

==== W40 Javelin Throw ====
15 athletes, 1 flight and final held on September 11, 2018

Pos	Athlete	Birthdate	Country	Result
1st place, gold medalist(s)	Liliia Apolosova	17-Feb-1978	Ukraine	42.20 m (138 ft 5 in)
2nd place, silver medalist(s)	Jindriska Noasova	26-May-1978	Czech Republic	36.76 m (120 ft 7 in)
3rd place, bronze medalist(s)	Twiggy Lejeune Vasquez	25-09-1974	France	36.36 m (119 ft 3 in)

==== W45 Javelin Throw ====
17 athletes, 1 flight and final held on September 11, 2018

Pos	Athlete	Birthdate	Country	Result
1st place, gold medalist(s)	Agnes Benczenleitnerne Preisinger	03-Aug-1973	Hungary	43.69 m (143 ft 4 in)
2nd place, silver medalist(s)	Dagmar Suhling	15-Sep-1969	Germany	42.39 m (139 ft 0 in)
3rd place, bronze medalist(s)	Paula Williams	18-Mar-1972	Great Britain	38.65 m (126 ft 9 in)

==== W50 Javelin Throw ====
28 athletes, 2 flights and final held on September 11, 2018

Pos	Athlete	Birthdate	Country	Result
1st place, gold medalist(s)	Gwendolyn Smith	30-Jul-1964	Trinidad and Tobago	42.71 m (140 ft 1 in)
2nd place, silver medalist(s)	Durelle Schimek	16-Feb-1968	United States	40.14 m (131 ft 8 in)
3rd place, bronze medalist(s)	Heleen Knobel	22-Jun-1965	South Africa	34.44 m (112 ft 11 in)

==== W55 Javelin Throw ====
31 athletes, 2 flights and final held on September 11, 2018

Pos	Athlete	Birthdate	Country	Result
1st place, gold medalist(s)	Heli Herlevi-Malila	01-Feb-1961	Finland	37.60 m (123 ft 4 in)
2nd place, silver medalist(s)	Maria Ceu Cunha	13-Dec-1962	Portugal	35.24 m (115 ft 7 in)
3rd place, bronze medalist(s)	Susanne Strohm	08-Aug-1963	Germany	34.22 m (112 ft 3 in)

==== W60 Javelin Throw ====
25 athletes, 2 flights and final held on September 11, 2018

Pos	Athlete	Birthdate	Country	Result
1st place, gold medalist(s)	Barbara Dabrowski	15-Jun-1957	Canada	32.85 m (107 ft 9 in)
2nd place, silver medalist(s)	Anne Kirstine Jensen	20-Jun-1954	Denmark	32.14 m (105 ft 5 in)
3rd place, bronze medalist(s)	Live Basen	28-Feb-1958	Norway	28.05 m (92 ft 0 in)

==== W65 Javelin Throw ====
28 athletes, 2 flights and final held on September 10, 2018

Pos	Athlete	Birthdate	Country	Result
1st place, gold medalist(s)	Linda Cohn	07-Dec-1952	United States	34.81 m (114 ft 2 in) WR
2nd place, silver medalist(s)	Emilia Mesa Soriano	06-Nov-1952	Spain	28.90 m (94 ft 9 in)
3rd place, bronze medalist(s)	Erlinda Lavandia	09-Apr-1952	Philippines	27.95 m (91 ft 8 in)

==== W70 Javelin Throw ====
19 athletes, 1 flight and final held on September 10, 2018

Pos	Athlete	Birthdate	Country	Result
1st place, gold medalist(s)	Jarmila Klimešová	05-Nov-1947	Czech Republic	27.95 m (91 ft 8 in) WR
2nd place, silver medalist(s)	Jadvyga Putinienė	02-Oct-1944	Lithuania	23.39 m (76 ft 8 in)
3rd place, bronze medalist(s)	Magdalena Franckx	13-May-1946	Belgium	20.28 m (66 ft 6 in)

==== W75 Javelin Throw ====
21 athletes, 1 flight and final held on September 10, 2018

Pos	Athlete	Birthdate	Country	Result
1st place, gold medalist(s)	Adelheid Graber-Bolliger	01-Apr-1943	Switzerland	22.86 m (75 ft 0 in)
2nd place, silver medalist(s)	Maria Teresa Rizzo Garcia	17-Jun-1943	Guatemala	22.66 m (74 ft 4 in)
3rd place, bronze medalist(s)	Varpu Holmberg	22-Sep-1941	Finland	20.15 m (66 ft 1 in)

==== W80 Javelin Throw ====
September 10, 2018

Pos	Athlete	Birthdate	Country	Result
1st place, gold medalist(s)	Evaun Williams	19-Dec-1937	Great Britain	26.06 m (85 ft 5 in) WR
2nd place, silver medalist(s)	Tserendolgor Tumurbat	02-May-1938	Mongolia	21.90 m (71 ft 10 in)
3rd place, bronze medalist(s)	Miriam Cudmore	..-11-1937	Australia	19.90 m (65 ft 3 in)

==== W85 Javelin Throw ====
September 10, 2018

Pos	Athlete	Birthdate	Country	Result
1st place, gold medalist(s)	Margarita Cortez Palacios	16-Dec-1931	Chile	7.33 m (24 ft 0 in)
2nd place, silver medalist(s)	Thelma Wilson	01-Nov-1929	United States	4.45 m (14 ft 7 in)

==== W95 Javelin Throw ====
September 10, 2018

Pos	Athlete	Birthdate	Country	Result
1st place, gold medalist(s)	Nora Kutti	09-Oct-1922	Estonia	9.09 m (29 ft 9 in)

==== W100 Javelin Throw ====
September 10, 2018

Pos	Athlete	Birthdate	Country	Result
1st place, gold medalist(s)	Man Kaur	01-Mar-1916	India	4.56 m (14 ft 11 in)

=== Weight Throw ===
==== W35 Weight Throw ====
September 11, 2018

Pos	Athlete	Birthdate	Country	Result
1st place, gold medalist(s)	Vânia Silva	08-Jun-1980	Portugal	18.34 m (60 ft 2 in)
2nd place, silver medalist(s)	Maria Slok Hansen	08-Jan-1983	Denmark	15.11 m (49 ft 6 in)
3rd place, bronze medalist(s)	Dan Wang	07-Jul-1982	China	14.34 m (47 ft 0 in)

==== W40 Weight Throw ====
September 11, 2018

Pos	Athlete	Birthdate	Country	Result
1st place, gold medalist(s)	Byrony Glass	31-Mar-1977	Australia	15.42 m (50 ft 7 in)
2nd place, silver medalist(s)	Belen Mesa Fernandez	24-Feb-1978	Spain	15.38 m (50 ft 5 in)
3rd place, bronze medalist(s)	Violeta Guzmán	14-May-1977	Mexico	14.94 m (49 ft 0 in)

==== W45 Weight Throw ====
17 athletes, 1 flight held on September 11, 2018

Pos	Athlete	Birthdate	Country	Result
1st place, gold medalist(s)	Natalia Radionova	21-Jul-1973	Ukraine	13.75 m (45 ft 1 in)
2nd place, silver medalist(s)	Heidi Siimumäe	22-May-1970	Estonia	13.32 m (43 ft 8 in)
3rd place, bronze medalist(s)	Bettina Daniela Schardt	12-Apr-1972	Germany	12.76 m (41 ft 10 in)

==== W50 Weight Throw ====
17 athletes, 1 flight held on September 11, 2018

Pos	Athlete	Birthdate	Country	Result
1st place, gold medalist(s)	Gabriele Watts	20-Feb-1966	Australia	15.98 m (52 ft 5 in)
2nd place, silver medalist(s)	Margret Klein-Raber	30-May-1964	Germany	15.85 m (52 ft 0 in)
3rd place, bronze medalist(s)	Janet Smith	07-Oct-1964	Great Britain	14.79 m (48 ft 6 in)

==== W55 Weight Throw ====
28 athletes, 2 flights and final held on September 11, 2018

Pos	Athlete	Birthdate	Country	Result
1st place, gold medalist(s)	Connie Hodel	13-Apr-1963	Switzerland	15.02 m (49 ft 3 in)
2nd place, silver medalist(s)	Dominique Beaufour	21-Aug-1962	France	14.12 m (46 ft 3 in)
3rd place, bronze medalist(s)	Erika Fandrich	30-Oct-1961	Germany	14.09 m (46 ft 2 in)

==== W60 Weight Throw ====
23 athletes, 2 flights and final held on September 11, 2018

Pos	Athlete	Birthdate	Country	Result
1st place, gold medalist(s)	Carol Finsrud	20-Feb-1957	United States	14.89 m (48 ft 10 in)
2nd place, silver medalist(s)	Liisa Makitorma	06-Jun-1957	Finland	14.66 m (48 ft 1 in)
3rd place, bronze medalist(s)	Tiny Hellendoorn	25-Mar-1955	Netherlands	14.34 m (47 ft 0 in)

==== W65 Weight Throw ====
21 athletes, 1 flight, held on September 11, 2018

Pos	Athlete	Birthdate	Country	Result
1st place, gold medalist(s)	Eva Nohl	27-Nov-1948	Germany	13.86 m (45 ft 5 in)
2nd place, silver medalist(s)	Margarethe Tomanek	20-Jul-1949	Belgium	12.69 m (41 ft 7 in)
3rd place, bronze medalist(s)	Elisa Yli-Hallila	03-Nov-1952	Finland	12.47 m (40 ft 10 in)

==== W70 Weight Throw ====
14 athletes, 1 flight, held on September 11, 2018

Pos	Athlete	Birthdate	Country	Result
1st place, gold medalist(s)	Inge Faldager	08-Jan-1948	Denmark	11.34 m (37 ft 2 in)
2nd place, silver medalist(s)	Jadvyga Putinienė	02-Oct-1944	Lithuania	11.15 m (36 ft 6 in)
3rd place, bronze medalist(s)	Grete Rivenes	18-Mar-1948	Norway	11.04 m (36 ft 2 in)

==== W75 Weight Throw ====
15 athletes, 1 flight, held on September 11, 2018

Pos	Athlete	Birthdate	Country	Result
1st place, gold medalist(s)	Janice Lorraine Davies Banens	20-Oct-1941	Australia	12.75 m (41 ft 9 in)
2nd place, silver medalist(s)	Tiia Krutob	23-Nov-1941	Estonia	11.65 m (38 ft 2 in)
3rd place, bronze medalist(s)	Elise Marie Waale	02-Jun-1942	Norway	11.16 m (36 ft 7 in)

==== W80 Weight Throw ====
September 11, 2018

Pos	Athlete	Birthdate	Country	Result
1st place, gold medalist(s)	Tserendolgor Tumurbat	02-May-1938	Mongolia	10.04 m (32 ft 11 in)
2nd place, silver medalist(s)	Sumiko Yamakawa Imoto	01-Mar-1938	Brazil	9.51 m (31 ft 2 in)
3rd place, bronze medalist(s)	Asta Satsi	18-May-1935	Estonia	9.02 m (29 ft 7 in)

==== W90 Weight Throw ====
September 11, 2018

Pos	Athlete	Birthdate	Country	Result
1st place, gold medalist(s)	Julia Huapaya	01-Jan-1927	Peru	7.57 m (24 ft 10 in)

=== Throws Pentathlon ===
==== W35 Throws Pentathlon ====
September 15, 2018

Pos	Athlete	Birthdate	Country	Result
1st place, gold medalist(s)	Maria Slok Hansen	08-Jan-1983	Denmark	4110
1st place, gold medalist(s)	Hammer / Shot put / Discus / Javelin / Weight; 49.93m / 14.85m / 48.38m / 26.78m / 14.97m			
2nd place, silver medalist(s)	Dan Wang	07-Jul-1982	China	3472
2nd place, silver medalist(s)	Hammer / Shot put / Discus / Javelin / Weight; 48.42m / 12.19m / 35.61m / 31.55m / 11.26m			
3rd place, bronze medalist(s)	Wilma Jansen	29-Oct-1980	Germany	3515
3rd place, bronze medalist(s)	Hammer / Shot put / Discus / Javelin / Weight; 34.29m / 12.15m / 33.63m / 41.76m / 11.54m			

==== W40 Throws Pentathlon ====
13 athletes, September 15, 2018

Pos	Athlete	Birthdate	Country	Result
1st place, gold medalist(s)	Byrony Glass	31-Mar-1977	Australia	3690
1st place, gold medalist(s)	Hammer / Shot put / Discus / Javelin / Weight; 47.24m / 10.83m / 32.30m / 20.42m / 15.90m			
2nd place, silver medalist(s)	Andrea Jenkins	04-Oct-1975	Great Britain	3536
2nd place, silver medalist(s)	Hammer / Shot put / Discus / Javelin / Weight; 45.05m / 9.88m / 35.30m / 21.25m / 14.42m			
3rd place, bronze medalist(s)	Jindriska Noasova	26-May-1978	Czech Republic	3350
3rd place, bronze medalist(s)	Hammer / Shot put / Discus / Javelin / Weight; 36.59m / 9.97m / 34.33m / 34.19m / 11.27m			

==== W45 Throws Pentathlon ====
17 athletes, September 15, 2018

Pos	Athlete	Birthdate	Country	Result
1st place, gold medalist(s)	Dagmar Suhling	15-Sep-1969	Germany	3736
1st place, gold medalist(s)	Hammer / Shot put / Discus / Javelin / Weight; 33.30m / 10.80m / 31.21m / 40.54m / 11.24m			
2nd place, silver medalist(s)	Bettina Daniela Schardt	12-Apr-1972	Germany	3621
2nd place, silver medalist(s)	Hammer / Shot put / Discus / Javelin / Weight; 38.82m / 9.11m / 38.82m / 24.95m / 11.94m			
3rd place, bronze medalist(s)	Johana Maria Hernandez Rojas	06-Dec-1972	Spain	3343
3rd place, bronze medalist(s)	Hammer / Shot put / Discus / Javelin / Weight; 32.14m / 10.16m / 26.09m / 28.52m / 12.43m			

==== W50 Throws Pentathlon ====
24 athletes, September 16, 2018

Pos	Athlete	Birthdate	Country	Result
1st place, gold medalist(s)	Gabriele Watts	20-Feb-1966	Australia	4166
1st place, gold medalist(s)	Hammer / Shot put / Discus / Javelin / Weight; 40.87m / 12.25m / 36.29m / 25.52m / 14.59m			
2nd place, silver medalist(s)	Gwendolyn Smith	30-Jul-1964	Trinidad and Tobago	4120
2nd place, silver medalist(s)	Hammer / Shot put / Discus / Javelin / Weight; 31.23m / 13.53m / 30.00m / 42.46m / 12.58m			
3rd place, bronze medalist(s)	Heleen Knobel	22-Jun-1965	South Africa	4118
3rd place, bronze medalist(s)	Hammer / Shot put / Discus / Javelin / Weight; 43.01m / 10.80m / 33.78m / 30.85m / 13.82m			

==== W55 Throws Pentathlon ====
29 athletes, September 16, 2018

Pos	Athlete	Birthdate	Country	Result
1st place, gold medalist(s)	Maria Ceu Cunha	13-Dec-1962	Portugal	4266
1st place, gold medalist(s)	Hammer / Shot put / Discus / Javelin / Weight; 35.76m / 12.21m / 27.03m / 34.88m / 12.26m			
2nd place, silver medalist(s)	Dominique Beaufour	21-Aug-1962	France	4182
2nd place, silver medalist(s)	Hammer / Shot put / Discus / Javelin / Weight; 43.78m / 10.62m / 26.31m / 24.11m / 13.87m			
3rd place, bronze medalist(s)	Erika Fandrich	30-Oct-1961	Germany	4125
3rd place, bronze medalist(s)	Hammer / Shot put / Discus / Javelin / Weight; 41.74m / 10.72m / 24.60m / 27.87m / 13.16n			

==== W60 Throws Pentathlon ====
20 athletes, September 16, 2018

Pos	Athlete	Birthdate	Country	Result
1st place, gold medalist(s)	Carol Finsrud	20-Feb-1957	United States	4609
1st place, gold medalist(s)	Hammer / Shot put / Discus / Javelin / Weight; 39.43m / 10.67m / 34.41m / 23.04m / 14.06m			
2nd place, silver medalist(s)	Tiny Hellendoorn	25-Mar-1955	Netherlands	4608
2nd place, silver medalist(s)	Hammer / Shot put / Discus / Javelin / Weight; 36.64m / 11.74m / 31.26m / 24.94m / 14.42m			
3rd place, bronze medalist(s)	Liisa Makitorma	06-Jun-1957	Finland	4261
3rd place, bronze medalist(s)	Hammer / Shot put / Discus / Javelin / Weight; 35.79m / 9.85m / 26.96m / 25.37m / 14.36m			

==== W65 Throws Pentathlon ====
16 athletes, September 16, 2018

Pos	Athlete	Birthdate	Country	Result
1st place, gold medalist(s)	Margarethe Tomanek	20-Jul-1949	Belgium	4013
1st place, gold medalist(s)	Hammer / Shot put / Discus / Javelin / Weight; 33.86m / 8.38m / 25.53m / 16.99m / 12.04m			
2nd place, silver medalist(s)	Eva Nohl	27-Nov-1948	Germany	3869
2nd place, silver medalist(s)	Hammer / Shot put / Discus / Javelin / Weight; 33.49m / 7.27m / 19.18m / 20.99m / 12.94m			
3rd place, bronze medalist(s)	Toini Nousiainen	21-Aug-1952	Finland	3796
3rd place, bronze medalist(s)	Hammer / Shot put / Discus / Javelin / Weight; 28.92m / 8.05m / 20.50m / 23.21m / 11.65m			

==== W70 Throws Pentathlon ====
13 athletes, September 12, 2018

Pos	Athlete	Birthdate	Country	Result
1st place, gold medalist(s)	Jadvyga Putinienė	02-Oct-1944	Lithuania	4505
1st place, gold medalist(s)	Hammer / Shot put / Discus / Javelin / Weight; 21.90m / 9.05m / 20.93m / 22.03m / 11.24m			
2nd place, silver medalist(s)	Grete Rivenes	18-Mar-1948	Norway	3960
2nd place, silver medalist(s)	Hammer / Shot put / Discus / Javelin / Weight; 26.33m / 8.30m / 20.95m / 16.78m / 10.67m			
3rd place, bronze medalist(s)	Jarmila Klimešová	05-Nov-1947	Czech Republic	3915
3rd place, bronze medalist(s)	Hammer / Shot put / Discus / Javelin / Weight; 21.09m / 8.69m / 18.31m / 27.16m / 8.63m			

==== W75 Throws Pentathlon ====
14 athletes, September 12, 2018

Pos	Athlete	Birthdate	Country	Result
1st place, gold medalist(s)	Maria Luisa Fancello	15-Feb-1943	Italy	4451
1st place, gold medalist(s)	Hammer / Shot put / Discus / Javelin / Weight; 32.22m / 8.68m / 25.33m / 14.15m / 11.78m			
2nd place, silver medalist(s)	Jeanette Williamson		Australia	4128
2nd place, silver medalist(s)	Hammer / Shot put / Discus / Javelin / Weight; 30.40m / 7.80m / 21.52m / 15.13m / 11.59m			
3rd place, bronze medalist(s)	Adelheid Graber-Bolliger	01-Apr-1943	Switzerland	4036
3rd place, bronze medalist(s)	Hammer / Shot put / Discus / Javelin / Weight; 18.63m / 9.53m / 22.09m / 22.24m / 9.90m			

==== W80 Throws Pentathlon ====
September 12, 2018

Pos	Athlete	Birthdate	Country	Result
1st place, gold medalist(s)	Evaun Williams	19-Dec-1937	Great Britain	6080 WR
1st place, gold medalist(s)	Hammer / Shot put / Discus / Javelin / Weight; 37.85m WR / 9.23m / 23.00m / 24.65m / 12.68m WR			
2nd place, silver medalist(s)	Sumiko Yamakawa Imoto	01-Mar-1938	Brazil	4401
2nd place, silver medalist(s)	Hammer / Shot put / Discus / Javelin / Weight; 23.08m / 9.26m / 21.03m / 14.19m / 9.47m			
3rd place, bronze medalist(s)	Brita Kiesheyer	09-Nov-1937	Germany	3463
3rd place, bronze medalist(s)	Hammer / Shot put / Discus / Javelin / Weight; 20.70m / 6.95m / 15.15m / 12.78m / 8.06m			

==== W90 Throws Pentathlon ====
September 12, 2018

Pos	Athlete	Birthdate	Country	Result
1st place, gold medalist(s)	Julia Huapaya	01-Jan-1927	Peru	3,709
1st place, gold medalist(s)	Hammer / Shot put / Discus / Javelin / Weight; 18.62m / 4.98m / 10.90m / 6.47m / 6.73m			

=== Heptathlon ===
==== W35 Heptathlon ====
8 athletes, September 5–6, 2018

Pos	Athlete	Birthdate	Country	Result
1st place, gold medalist(s)	Wendy Visser	19-Aug-1981	Netherlands	4434
1st place, gold medalist(s)	100m H / High jump / Shot put / 200m / Long jump / Javelin / 800m; 16.24 -2.7 / 1.49m / 10.30m / 28.14 -4.4 / 4.94m -2.2 / 31.30m / 2:36.29			
2nd place, silver medalist(s)	Jodie Albrow	04-Nov-1982	Great Britain	4327
2nd place, silver medalist(s)	100m H / High jump / Shot put / 200m / Long jump / Javelin / 800m; 17.31 -2.7 / 1.49m / 9.51m / 28.34 -4.4 / 4.79m -2.0 / 34.32m / 2:30.69			
3rd place, bronze medalist(s)	Linda Holmstroem	15-Jun-1979	Sweden	4075
3rd place, bronze medalist(s)	100m H / High jump / Shot put / 200m / Long jump / Javelin / 800m; 16.97 -2.7 / 1.43m / 9.01m / 28.94 -4.4 / 4.69m -3.3 / 27.50m / 2:28.91			

==== W40 Heptathlon ====
10 athletes, September 5–6, 2018

Pos	Athlete	Birthdate	Country	Result
1st place, gold medalist(s)	Rachel Guest	15-Apr-1975	United States	4979
1st place, gold medalist(s)	80m H (wind) / High jump / Shot put / 200m (wind) / Long jump (wind) / Javelin / 800m; 11.88 -1.1 / 1.51m / 7.98m / 26.58 -2.9 / 4.76m -5.1 / 31.72m / 2:44.27			
2nd place, silver medalist(s)	Jennifer Gartmann	04-Apr-1976	Germany	4779
2nd place, silver medalist(s)	80m H (wind) / High jump / Shot put / 200m (wind) / Long jump (wind) / Javelin / 800m; 11.86 -1.1 / 1.48m / 9.78m / 27.23 -2.9 / 4.84m -4.2 / 22.62m / 2:50.79			
3rd place, bronze medalist(s)	Renata Szykulska	17-Aug-1974	Poland	4177
3rd place, bronze medalist(s)	80m H (wind) / High jump / Shot put / 200m (wind) / Long jump (wind) / Javelin / 800m; 12.99 -0.3 / 1.42m / 7.83m / 28.58 -6.2 / 4.82m -4.2 / 23.26m / 3:00.21			

==== W45 Heptathlon ====
16 athletes, September 5–6, 2018

Pos	Athlete	Birthdate	Country	Result
1st place, gold medalist(s)	Tatjana Schilling	05-Oct-1970	Germany	5888
1st place, gold medalist(s)	80m H (wind) / High jump / Shot put / 200m (wind) / Long jump (wind) / Javelin / 800m; 12.54 +1.0 / 1.54m / 11.15m / 27.24 -4.3 / 5.06m -0.7 / 29.13m / 2:35.58			
2nd place, silver medalist(s)	Manuela Gross	12-Jul-1971	Germany	5391
2nd place, silver medalist(s)	80m H (wind) / High jump / Shot put / 200m (wind) / Long jump (wind) / Javelin / 800m; 12.95 +1.0 / 1.54m / 9.33m / 29.94 -4.3 / 5.02m -0.6 / 31.12m / 2:44.87			
3rd place, bronze medalist(s)	Catrine Eriksson	16-Feb-1973	Sweden	5143
3rd place, bronze medalist(s)	80m H (wind) / High jump / Shot put / 200m (wind) / Long jump (wind) / Javelin / 800m; 13.41 +1.0 / 1.51m / 10.21m / 29.72 -3.2 / 4.58m +0.0 / 27.60m / 2:44.10			

==== W50 Heptathlon ====
23 athletes, September 5–6, 2018

Pos	Athlete	Birthdate	Country	Result
1st place, gold medalist(s)	Neringa Jakstiene	18-Oct-1963	Lithuania	5368
1st place, gold medalist(s)	80m H (wind) / High jump / Shot put / 200m (wind) / Long jump (wind) / Javelin / 800m; 13.01 +0.0 / 1.46m / 9.35m / 29.61 -0.5 / 4.75m -2.0 / 22.81m / 2:53.59			
2nd place, silver medalist(s)	Janet Dickinson	10-Mar-1967	Great Britain	5322
2nd place, silver medalist(s)	80m H (wind) / High jump / Shot put / 200m (wind) / Long jump (wind) / Javelin / 800m; 13.91 -2.9 / 1.37m / 8.67m / 28.22 -1.4 / 4.77m -0.6 / 27.16m / 2:49.00			
3rd place, bronze medalist(s)	Geraldine Finegan	14-10-1965	Ireland	5195
3rd place, bronze medalist(s)	80m H (wind) / High jump / Shot put / 200m (wind) / Long jump (wind) / Javelin / 800m; 14.05 -2.9 / 1.46m / 9.90m / 30.58 -1.4 / 4.20m -1.7 / 28.89m / 2:48.36			

==== W55 Heptathlon ====
16 athletes, September 5–6, 2018

Pos	Athlete	Birthdate	Country	Result
1st place, gold medalist(s)	Angela Mueller	15-Apr-1962	Germany	5598
1st place, gold medalist(s)	80m H (wind) / High jump / Shot put / 200m (wind) / Long jump (wind) / Javelin / 800m; 14.81 -2.0 / 1.35m / 10.74m / 31.57 +1.4 / 4.48m +1.2 / 32.59m / 3:16.71			
2nd place, silver medalist(s)	Romana Schulz	07-Sep-1962	Germany	5253
2nd place, silver medalist(s)	80m H (wind) / High jump / Shot put / 200m (wind) / Long jump (wind) / Javelin / 800m; 13.94 -2.0 / 1.29m / 9.72m / 30.39 +1.4 / 4.31m +0.1 / 22.60m / 3:18.12			
3rd place, bronze medalist(s)	Janean Shannon	21-Sep-1962	United States	4582
3rd place, bronze medalist(s)	80m H (wind) / High jump / Shot put / 200m (wind) / Long jump (wind) / Javelin / 800m; 15.95 -2.3 / 1.20m / 8.18m / 31.03 +0.4 / 4.05m +1.3 / 23.83m / 3:19.05			

==== W60 Heptathlon ====
9 athletes, September 5–6, 2018

Pos	Athlete	Birthdate	Country	Result
1st place, gold medalist(s)	Anja Akkerman-Smits	01-May-1955	Netherlands	5335
1st place, gold medalist(s)	80m H (wind) / High jump / Shot put / 200m (wind) / Long jump (wind) / Javelin / 800m; 15.17 -1.4 / 1.29m / 9.31m / 33.00 -0.8 / 3.88m +1.9 / 27.75m / 3:32.52			
2nd place, silver medalist(s)	Rita Hanscom	11-May-1954	United States	5072
2nd place, silver medalist(s)	80m H (wind) / High jump / Shot put / 200m (wind) / Long jump (wind) / Javelin / 800m; 15.11 -1.4 / 1.26m / 8.29m / 35.46 -0.8 / 3.89m +2.0 / 24.94m / 3:18.57			
3rd place, bronze medalist(s)	Carla Hoppie	07-Jan-1957	United States	3986
3rd place, bronze medalist(s)	80m H (wind) / High jump / Shot put / 200m (wind) / Long jump (wind) / Javelin / 800m; 20.48 +0.3 / 1.26m / 8.45m / 37.34 -2.0 / 3.31m +0.0 / 19.21m / 3:20.14			

==== W65 Heptathlon ====
10 athletes, September 5–6, 2018

Pos	Athlete	Birthdate	Country	Result
1st place, gold medalist(s)	Toini Nousiainen	21-Aug-1952	Finland	5201
1st place, gold medalist(s)	80m H (wind) / High jump / Shot put / 200m (wind) / Long jump (wind) / Javelin / 800m; 17.38 +0.8 / 1.14m / 8.27m / 36.46 -2.0 / 3.59m -0.3 / 24.70m / 3:24.09			
2nd place, silver medalist(s)	Ulla Karneback	09-May-1953	Sweden	5112
2nd place, silver medalist(s)	80m H (wind) / High jump / Shot put / 200m (wind) / Long jump (wind) / Javelin / 800m; 15.80 +0.7 / 1.08m / 6.69m / 33.87 -2.6 / 3.63m -2.1 / 12.05m / 2:58.43			
3rd place, bronze medalist(s)	Wilma Perkins	05-Sep-1949	Australia	5011
3rd place, bronze medalist(s)	80m H (wind) / High jump / Shot put / 200m (wind) / Long jump (wind) / Javelin / 800m; 16.11 +0.8 / 1.11m / 7.61m / 34.55 -2.0 / 3.68m -1.3 / 19.54m / 3:47.82			

==== W70 Heptathlon ====
10 athletes, September 5–6, 2018

Pos	Athlete	Birthdate	Country	Result
1st place, gold medalist(s)	Riet Jonkers-Slegers	04-Oct-1943	Netherlands	5659
1st place, gold medalist(s)	80m H (wind) / High jump / Shot put / 200m (wind) / Long jump (wind) / Javelin / 800m; 18.01 +1.1 / 1.11m / 7.38m / 35.75 -2.4 / 3.50m +0.0 / 15.78m / 3:25.21			
2nd place, silver medalist(s)	Margaritha Dahler-Stettler	21-Aug-1947	Switzerland	4999
2nd place, silver medalist(s)	80m H (wind) / High jump / Shot put / 200m (wind) / Long jump (wind) / Javelin / 800m; 19.13 +1.1 / 1.08m / 7.68m / 38.62 -2.4 / 3.25m +2.6 / 18.23m / 4:02.92			
3rd place, bronze medalist(s)	Ingeborg Zorzi	25-Mar-1948	Italy	4722
3rd place, bronze medalist(s)	80m H (wind) / High jump / Shot put / 200m (wind) / Long jump (wind) / Javelin / 800m; 25.13 +1.1 / 1.14m / 7.06m / 37.40 -2.4 / 3.21m +0.0 / 19.54m / 3:52.50			

==== W75 Heptathlon ====
September 5–6, 2018

Pos	Athlete	Birthdate	Country	Result
1st place, gold medalist(s)	Marianne Maier	25-Dec-1942	Austria	6658 WR
1st place, gold medalist(s)	80m H (wind) / High jump / Shot put / 200m (wind) / Long jump (wind) / Javelin / 800m; 17.89 -1.0 / 1.08m / 11.50m / 36.32 +0.5 / 3.49m +1.7 / 17.11m / 4:30.86			
2nd place, silver medalist(s)	Seija Sario	12-Dec-1940	Finland	3957
2nd place, silver medalist(s)	80m H (wind) / High jump / Shot put / 200m (wind) / Long jump (wind) / Javelin / 800m; 26.02 -1.0 / 1.02m / 6.69m / 46.43 +0.5 / 2.67m -0.6 / 11.20m / 4:29.74			
3rd place, bronze medalist(s)	Varpu Holmberg	22-Sep-1941	Finland	3627
3rd place, bronze medalist(s)	80m H (wind) / High jump / Shot put / 200m (wind) / Long jump (wind) / Javelin / 800m; 33.33 -1.0 / 0.96m / 7.04m / 48.17 +0.5 / 2.62m -0.2 / 20.52m / 5:00.78			

==== W80 Heptathlon ====
September 5–6, 2018

Pos	Athlete	Birthdate	Country	Result
1st place, gold medalist(s)	Christel Donley	20-Jan-1935	United States	4212
1st place, gold medalist(s)	80m H (wind) / High jump / Shot put / 200m (wind) / Long jump (wind) / Javelin / 800m; 26.62 -1.0 / 1.02m +0.0 / 6.37m / 49.07 +0.5 / 2.30m / 11.64m / DNF			
2nd place, silver medalist(s)	Brita Kiesheyer	09-Nov-1937	Germany	2899
2nd place, silver medalist(s)	80m H (wind) / High jump / Shot put / 200m (wind) / Long jump (wind) / Javelin / 800m; DNF -1.0 / 0.87m / 6.73m / 58.15 +0.5 / 1.96m +1.2 / 11.79m / 6:14.57			
3rd place, bronze medalist(s)	Dorothy McLennan	11-Sep-1935	Ireland	1692
3rd place, bronze medalist(s)	80m H (wind) / High jump / Shot put / 200m (wind) / Long jump (wind) / Javelin / 800m; 38.10 -1.0 / 0.84m / 5.01m / 1:09.37 +0.5 / NM / 7.13m / 7:24.27			

== See also ==
- 2018 World Masters Athletics Championships Men
