= 1986 World Junior Championships in Athletics – Women's long jump =

Sports event held in Athens, Greece

The women's long jump event at the 1986 World Junior Championships in Athletics was held in Athens, Greece, at Olympic Stadium on 18 and 19 July.

== Medalists ==
Gold	Patricia Bille; East Germany
Silver	Anu Kaljurand; Soviet Union
Bronze	Tatyana Ter-Mesrobyan; Soviet Union

== Results ==
=== Final ===
19 July

Rank	Name	Nationality	Result	Notes
1st place, gold medalist(s)	Patricia Bille	East Germany	6.70	
2nd place, silver medalist(s)	Anu Kaljurand	Soviet Union	6.46	
3rd place, bronze medalist(s)	Tatyana Ter-Mesrobyan	Soviet Union	6.39	
4	Caroline Missoudan	France	6.33	
5	Mirela Belu	Romania	6.27	
6	Wang Shu-Hua	Chinese Taipei	6.18	
7	Carlette Guidry	United States	6.13	
8	Fiona May	United Kingdom	6.11	
9	Ulrike Kubla	West Germany	6.02	
10	Mieke van der Kolk	Netherlands	5.98	
11	Kathi Sabernig	Austria	5.87	
12	Katalin Csapo	Hungary	5.83	

=== Qualifications ===
18 Jul

==== Group A ====
Rank	Name	Nationality	Result	Notes
1	Patricia Bille	East Germany	6.17	Q
2	Tatyana Ter-Mesrobyan	Soviet Union	6.06	q
3	Katalin Csapo	Hungary	5.97	q
4	Mariana Khristova	Bulgaria	5.86	
5	Niurka Montalvo	Cuba	5.86	
6	Beatrice Utondu	Nigeria	5.83	
7	Tonya Sedwick	United States	5.78	
8	Simone Lemieux	Canada	5.65	
9	Sandra Govinden	Mauritius	5.52	
10	K.H. Salaimma	India	5.39	
11	Buenaventura Santana	Dominican Republic	5.27	
12	Karin Andersson	Sweden	5.24	
13	Cathy Rasehei	Papua New Guinea	4.97	

==== Group B ====
Rank	Name	Nationality	Result	Notes
1	Mieke van der Kolk	Netherlands	6.20	Q
2	Mirela Belu	Romania	6.12	Q
3	Ulrike Kubla	West Germany	6.10	Q
4	Fiona May	United Kingdom	6.10	Q
5	Anu Kaljurand	Soviet Union	6.10	Q
6	Caroline Missoudan	France	6.06	q
7	Wang Shu-Hua	Chinese Taipei	5.95	q
8	Carlette Guidry	United States	5.94	q
9	Kathi Sabernig	Austria	5.87	q
10	Caroline Nwajei	Nigeria	5.79	
11	Akiko Maekawa	Japan	5.71	
12	Leslie Wilson	Canada	5.62	
13	Mónica Falcioni	Uruguay	5.52	
14	Rowan Maynard	Antigua and Barbuda	5.43	

== Participation ==
According to an unofficial count, 27 athletes from 23 countries participated in the event.

- Antigua and Barbuda (1)
- Austria (1)
- Bulgaria (1)
- Canada (2)
- Chinese Taipei (1)
- Cuba (1)
- Dominican Republic (1)
- East Germany (1)
- France (1)
- Hungary (1)
- India (1)
- Japan (1)
- Mauritius (1)
- Netherlands (1)
- Nigeria (2)
- Papua New Guinea (1)
- Romania (1)
- Soviet Union (2)
- Sweden (1)
- United Kingdom (1)
- United States (2)
- Uruguay (1)
- West Germany (1)
