= Athletics at the 1997 Summer Universiade – Women's triple jump =

The women's triple jump event at the 1997 Summer Universiade was held at the Stadio Cibali in Catania, Italy on 29 and 30 August.

== Medalists ==
Gold	Silver	Bronze
Olena Govorova; Ukraine	Olga Cepero; Cuba	Zhanna Gureyeva; Belarus

== Results ==
=== Qualification ===
Rank	Group	Athlete	Nationality	Result	Notes
1	A	Olena Govorova	Ukraine	14.19w	
2	A	Cristina Nicolau	Romania	14.04w	
3	A	Yelena Donkina	Russia	14.02w	
4	A	Olga Cepero	Cuba	14.02w	
5	A	Olena Khlusovych	Ukraine	14.00w	
6	B	Maria Costanza Moroni	Italy	13.97	
7	A	Zhanna Gureyeva	Belarus	13.96	
8	?	Dorthe Jensen	Denmark	13.84	NR
9	?	Barbara Lah	Italy	13.84	
10	?	Zita Bálint	Hungary	13.79w	
11	?	Maria de Souza	Brazil	13.71w	
11	?	Zlatka Georgieva	Bulgaria	13.71w	
13	?	Anja Valant	Slovenia	13.53	
14	?	Vanitta Kinard	United States	13.50	
15	?	Nkechi Madubuko	Germany	13.49	
16	?	Luciana dos Santos	Brazil	13.28	
17	?	Kristel Berendsen	Estonia	13.17	
18	?	Marija Martinović	Yugoslavia	13.15	
19	?	Cristina Morujão	Portugal	12.79	
20	?	Naïma Barakat	Algeria	11.98	
21	?	Patricia Traña	Nicaragua	11.61	
22	?	Shonda Swift	United States	10.96	
23	?	Cecilia Asalde	Peru	10.80	

=== Final ===
Rank	Athlete	Nationality	Result	Notes
1st place, gold medalist(s)	Olena Govorova	Ukraine	14.23	
2nd place, silver medalist(s)	Olga Cepero	Cuba	14.12	
3rd place, bronze medalist(s)	Zhanna Gureyeva	Belarus	13.93	
4	Yelena Donkina	Russia	13.69	
5	Cristina Nicolau	Romania	13.65	
6	Olena Khlusovych	Ukraine	13.62	
7	Barbara Lah	Italy	13.58	
8	Zita Bálint	Hungary	13.48	
9	Zlatka Georgieva	Bulgaria	13.30	
10	Dorthe Jensen	Denmark	13.17	
11	Maria Costanza Moroni	Italy	13.06	
12	Maria de Souza	Brazil	13.03	
