= Marko Turban =

Estonian high jumper

Marko Turban (born 14 May 1967) is a retired Estonian high jumper.

He was born in Rakvere. He competed at the 1996 Olympic Games and the 1997 World Indoor Championships without reaching the final.

His personal best is 2.30 metres, achieved in June 1996 in Rakvere. This is the Estonian record.

== Personal life ==
Turban is living with heptathlete and hurdler Anu Kaljurand, they have two children.
