= Beatrice Utondu =

Nigerian athlete (born 1969)

Personal information
- Born: 23 November 1969 (age 56)
Medal record
Women's athletics
Representing Nigeria
Olympic Games
Bronze medal – third place	1992 Barcelona	4x100 m relay
Commonwealth Games
Silver medal – second place	1990 Auckland	Long jump
Bronze medal – third place	1990 Auckland	4x100 m relay
Summer Universiade
Silver medal – second place	1993 Buffalo	4x100 m relay
Bronze medal – third place	1993 Buffalo	100 m
African Championships
Gold medal – first place	1989 Lagos	4×100 m relay
Gold medal – first place	1993 Durban	100 m
Gold medal – first place	1993 Durban	4×100 m relay
Silver medal – second place	1985 Cairo	4×100 m relay
Silver medal – second place	1989 Lagos	Long jump
Silver medal – second place	1993 Durban	Long jump

Beatrice Utondu (born 23 November 1969) is a former sprinter from Nigeria who won an Olympic bronze medal in 4 x 100 metres relay in Barcelona 1992. She specialized in the 100 metres event, setting her personal best of 11.40 seconds during the 1991 World Championships and becoming the African champion in the event in 1993.

Utondu competed for the Texas Southern Tigers track and field team in the NCAA.

She also won long jump in the 1987 All-Africa Games.

== Achievements ==
Year	Competition	Venue	Position	Event	Notes
Representing Nigeria
1986	World Junior Championships	Athens, Greece	15th (q)	Long jump	5.83 m
1987	All-Africa Games	Nairobi, Kenya	1st	Long jump	6.45 m
