= Lucy Evans (sprinter) =

British track and field athlete

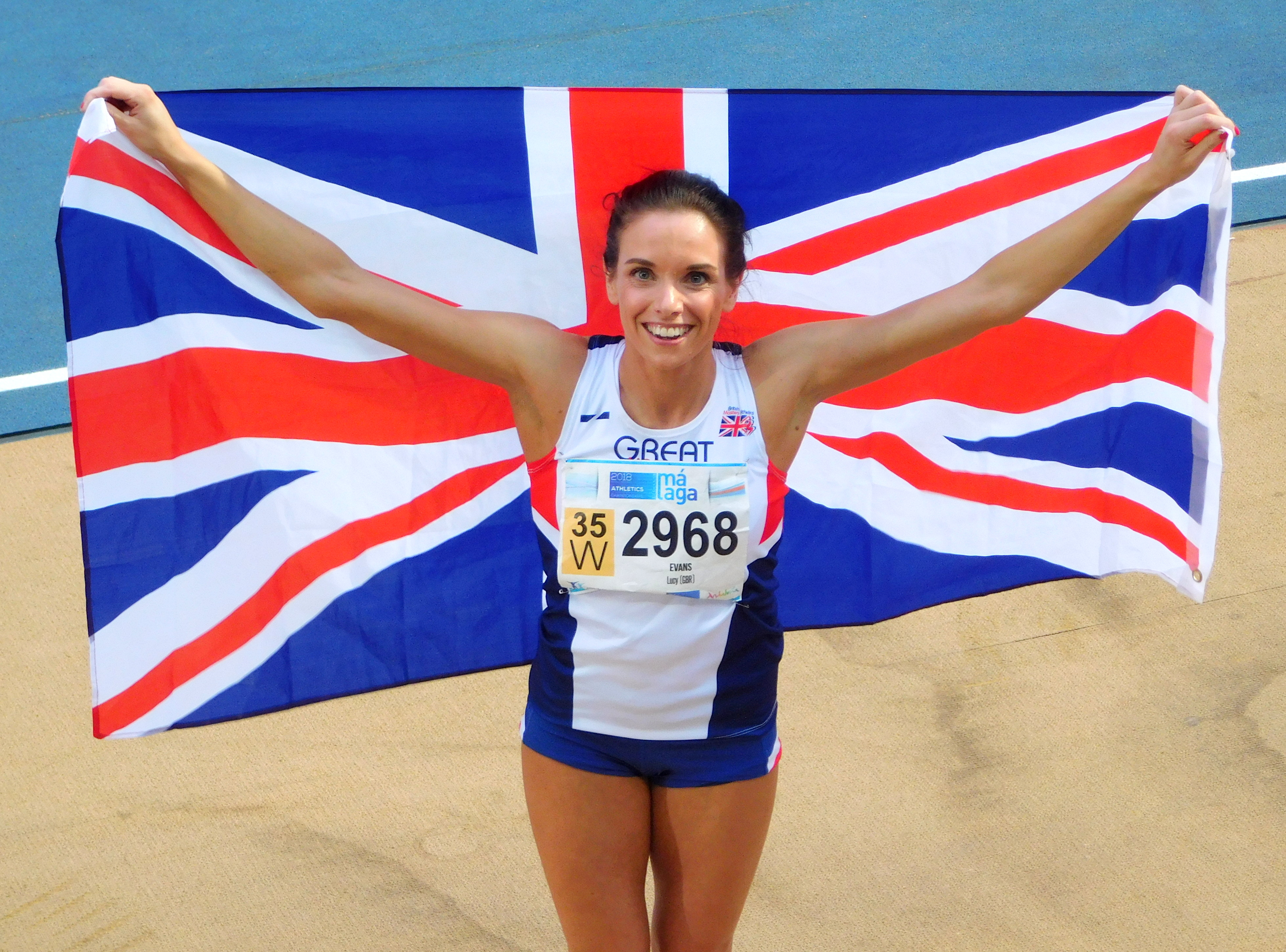
- Born: 2 October 1982 (age 43)

Lucy Evans (born 2 October 1982) is a British track and field athlete who specialises in the 100 and 200 metres sprinting events.

In 2018, Evans won the 100m and 200m at the British Masters Track and Field Championships before going on to win gold in the W35 100m and W35 200m at the World Masters Athletics Championships in Malaga. Prior to this, in 2014, Evans was a member of the Welsh 4 x 100m relay team at the Glasgow 2014 Commonwealth Games, which finished 7th in the final. (Note: The team finished 7th in the finals, but Evans was not an active runner in the races.)

As a junior athlete, Evans competed in the 200m at the Commonwealth Youth Games.

== Personal bests ==
- 100m: 11.61 (Leigh 2011)
- 200m: 23.94 (Cardiff 2014)
