= Anu Kaljurand =

Estonian hurdler

Personal information
- Nationality: Estonian
- Born: 16 April 1969 (age 57) Tallinn, then part of Estonian SSR, Soviet Union
- Height: 5 ft 8 in (1.73 m)

Sport
- Sport: Track and field
- Events: Heptathlon; 100 metres hurdles Long jump
- College team: BYU Cougars

Anu Kaljurand (born 16 April 1969) is a retired Estonian heptathlete.

== Career ==
She finished seventeenth in the heptathlon at the 1992 Summer Olympics and won the gold medal at the 1992 NCAA Division I Outdoor Track and Field Championships. Her score of 6142 points was her lifetime best, and was unmatched at the Championships since Jackie Joyner in 1983.

She also competed individually in the heptathlon events, winning the silver medal in the long jump at both the 1986 World Junior Championships and the 1988 World Junior Championships. She competed in the 100 metres hurdles at the 1992 Summer Olympics without reaching the final. She also holds the world U18 indoor best in long jump with 6.61.

== Personal life ==
In 1990 she enrolled at Brigham Young University as the first Soviet citizen to do so. She competed in athletics for the BYU Cougars. Graduating in Russian from Brigham Young University in 1993, she later got an MBA at Westminster College in 1997. Kaljurand is living with high jumper Marko Turban, they have two children.
