= Maria Costanza Moroni =

Italian high, long and triple jumper

Personal information
- National team: Italy: 10 caps (1987–2000)
- Born: 29 September 1969 (age 56) Turin, Italy

Sport
- Country: Italy
- Sport: Athletics
- Events: Long jump Triple jump High jump
- Club: Sisport Fiat (1998-2002)

Achievements and titles
- Personal bests: High jump: 1.82 m (1998); Long jump: 6.47 m (1998); Triple jump: 14.25 m (1998)

Maria Costanza "Mimma" Moroni (born 29 September 1969) is an Italian former high jumper, long jumper and triple jumper.

== Career ==
Moroni finished eighth at the 1988 World Junior Championships, eleventh at the 1997 Summer Universiade, and ninth at the 1997 Mediterranean Games. She also competed at the 1998 European Championships without reaching the final.

Moroni became Italian champion in 1998 and Italian indoor champion in 1997. Her personal best jump was 14.25 metres, achieved in July 1998 in Formia. She also had 6.47 metres in the long jump and 1.82 metres in the high jump, both achieved in 1998 too.

== Achievements ==
Senior

Year	Competition	Venue	Rank	Event	Time	Notes
1997	Mediterranean Games	Bari, Italy	9th	Triple jump	12.47 m	
1997	Universiade	Catania, Italy	16th	Triple jump	13.97 m	
1998	European Championships	Budapest, Hungary	16th	Triple jump	13.89 m	

Masters

Year	Competition	Venue	Rank	Event	Time	Notes
2015	World Championships	Lyon, France	1st	80 m hs W45	12.01	
2015	World Championships	Lyon, France	1st	Long jump W45	5.61 m	
2015	World Championships	Lyon, France	2nd	4×100 m relay W45	50.92	
2015	World Championships	Lyon, France	1st	4×400 m relay W45	3:57.23	
2018	World Championships	Málaga, Spain	2nd	80 m hs W45	12.80	
2018	World Championships	Málaga, Spain	1st	Long jump W45	5.20 m	
2018	World Championships	Málaga, Spain	2nd	4×100 m relay W45	53.32	
2018	World Championships	Málaga, Spain	2nd	4×400 m relay W45	4:13.13	

== See also ==
- Italian all-time lists - Triple jump
- List of Italian records in masters athletics
