= Olena Khlusovych =

Ukrainian triple jumper

Personal information
- Born: 2 December 1969 (age 56)

Sport
- Sport: Track and field

Olena Khlusovych (born 2 December 1969) is a retired Ukrainian triple jumper.

She finished twelfth at the 1996 Olympic Games. She also competed at the World Indoor Championships in 1995 and 1997, the 1997 World Championships and the 2000 Olympic Games without reaching the final.

Her personal best jump is 14.38 metres, achieved during the 1996 Olympic qualification round.
