= Wang Shu-hua =

Taiwanese sprinter

Personal information
- Nationality: Taiwanese
- Born: 王 淑華, Pinyin: Wáng Shū-huá; 21 March 1969 (age 57)

Sport
- Sport: Sprinting
- Event: 4 × 100 metres relay
Medal record
Women's athletics
Representing Chinese Taipei
Asian Championships
Bronze medal – third place	1987 Singapore	100 m hurdles
Bronze medal – third place	1987 Singapore	Heptathlon
Bronze medal – third place	1991 Kuala Lumpur	Heptathlon

Wang Shu-hua (born 21 March 1969) is a Taiwanese sprinter. She competed in the women's 4 × 100 metres relay at the 1988 Summer Olympics.

Wang is from Mioli, Taiwan. She competed at the 1988 World Junior Championships in Athletics in Greater Sudbury, Canada.

She was an All-American jumper and sprinter for the BYU Cougars track and field team, finishing 5th in the long jump at the 1991 NCAA Division I Indoor Track and Field Championships and 1992 NCAA Division I Indoor Track and Field Championships.

She also competed in the women's heptathlon for BYU. Wang set a Taiwanese record in the long jump at the 1991 World University Games.
