= Francis Duncan (writer) =

English writer

Francis Duncan was the pen name of William Underhill (1918–1988), a British writer who published over twenty works of detective fiction between 1938 and 1959. Later in his career he also wrote five historical romances (as Hilary West) and children's fiction (as Robert Preston). Underhill's detective works follow the conventions of the Golden Age of Detective Fiction, and mostly feature one of two detective characters – Peter Justice or Mordecai Tremaine. Largely neglected after his death in 1988, the success of a reprint of his 1949 novel Murder for Christmas in 2015 has led to further works being brought back into print.

== Biography ==
Born in Bristol in 1918 to a working-class family (his father was a docker at Avonmouth), Underhill obtained a scholarship to Queen Elizabeth's Hospital school, but was unable to afford to attend university. Underhill began writing in his spare time to supplement his income as a debt collector for Bristol City Council. He married Sylvia Henly in 1938 and had two children – Kathryn in 1943 and Derek in 1949.

In World War II he registered as a conscientious objector and volunteered for the Royal Army Medical Corps, serving as a medical orderly in France shortly after D-Day. His son, Derek, recalls his father saying that his most successful writing period was during World War II, when his time off-duty gave him the freedom to write, and there was a ready market for escapist detective fiction. After World War II, there was a national shortage of teachers and he was given training to be a primary school teacher. After undertaking an external economics degree he later became a lecturer in economics and history at a college of further education. He died of a heart attack in 1988.

== Detective fiction ==
His novels were moderately successful but, owing to his pseudonym, he remained virtually unknown and his books soon went out of print. A reprint of his 1949 novel Murder for Christmas in November 2015 proved commercially and critically successful, leading the publisher Vintage Books to put out a call for information about the author, about whom they had no details. The family contacted the publisher after seeing the reprint in a branch of Waterstones. Five of his novels featuring Mordecai Tremaine, a former tobacconist and lover of romance novels who dabbles in amateur detective work, have now been reprinted.

=== Peter Justice series ===
1. The Hand of Justice (1936)
2. The League of Justice (1937)
3. The Sword of Justice (1937)
4. Justice Returns (1940)
5. Justice Limited (1941)

=== Mordecai Tremaine series ===
1. They'll Never Find Out (1944)
2. Murder Has a Motive (1947)
3. Murderer's Bluff (1948)
4. Murder for Christmas (1949)
5. So Pretty a Problem (1950)
6. In at the Death (1952)
7. Behold a Fair Woman (1954)

=== Standalone novels ===
- Tigers Fight Alone (1938)
- Dangerous Mr. X (1939)
- Murder in Man (1940)
- Night Without End (1943)
- Fear Holds the Key (1945)
- Ministers Too Are Mortal (1951)
- Murder But Gently (1953)
- A Question of Time (1959)
