= 2016 World Masters Athletics Championships Men =

International athletics competition

The twenty-second World Masters Athletics Championships were held in Perth Australia, from October 26–November 6, 2016. This was the first even year of the biennial championship as beginning in 2016, the championships moved to be held in even numbered years. The World Masters Athletics Championships serve the division of the sport of athletics for people over 35 years of age, referred to as Masters athletics.

A full range of track and field events were held, along with a cross country race and a marathon.

== Results ==
=== 100 metres ===
==== M35 100 metres ====
Wind: +2.5

Pos	Athlete	Age	Country	Result
1st place, gold medalist(s)	Lion Martinez	M38	Sweden	10.94
2nd place, silver medalist(s)	Dwayne Caines	M35	Trinidad and Tobago	10.95
3rd place, bronze medalist(s)	Yusuke Shindo	M37	Japan	11.01

==== M40 100 metres ====
Wind: +3.4

Pos	Athlete	Age	Country	Result
1st place, gold medalist(s)	Tamunonengiye-Ofori Ossai	M41	Great Britain	10.58
2nd place, silver medalist(s)	Ashley McMahon	M41	Australia	10.67
3rd place, bronze medalist(s)	Steeve Lucenay	M40	France	10.78

==== M45 100 metres ====
Wind: +3.2

Pos	Athlete	Age	Country	Result
1st place, gold medalist(s)	Karnell Vickers	M49	United States	11.09
2nd place, silver medalist(s)	Takeshi Fukuzato	M45	Japan	11.10
3rd place, bronze medalist(s)	Reggie Pendland	M47	United States	11.12

==== M50 100 metres ====
Wind: +4.8

Pos	Athlete	Age	Country	Result
1st place, gold medalist(s)	Roland Groeger	M52	Germany	11.34
2nd place, silver medalist(s)	Clinton Aurelien	M50	United States	11.39
3rd place, bronze medalist(s)	Meinert Möller	M50	Germany	11.55

==== M55 100 metres ====
Wind: +2.3

Pos	Athlete	Age	Country	Result
1st place, gold medalist(s)	Don McGee	M56	United States	11.82
2nd place, silver medalist(s)	Rudy Kocis	M55	Australia	11.98
3rd place, bronze medalist(s)	Dirk Jacobs	M57	Belgium	12.12

==== M60 100 metres ====
Wind: +1.6

Pos	Athlete	Age	Country	Result
1st place, gold medalist(s)	Steve Peters	M63	Great Britain	12.11
2nd place, silver medalist(s)	Ryoichi Oe	M62	Japan	12.23
3rd place, bronze medalist(s)	Gerhard Zorn	M60	Germany	12.36

==== M65 100 metres ====
Wind: +2.8

Pos	Athlete	Age	Country	Result
1st place, gold medalist(s)	Bill Collins	M65	United States	12.17
2nd place, silver medalist(s)	Wojciech Seidel	M66	Poland	12.70
3rd place, bronze medalist(s)	Karl Dorschner	M65	Germany	12.76

==== M70 100 metres ====
Wind: +4.0

Pos	Athlete	Age	Country	Result
1st place, gold medalist(s)	Peter Crombie	M71	Australia	13.07
2nd place, silver medalist(s)	Roberto Paesani	M70	Italy	13.26
3rd place, bronze medalist(s)	Victor Novell	M71	Great Britain	13.37

==== M75 100 metres ====
Wind: +3.1

Pos	Athlete	Age	Country	Result
1st place, gold medalist(s)	Barrie Kernaghan	M76	Australia	14.33
2nd place, silver medalist(s)	Hermann Beckering	M77	Germany	14.41
3rd place, bronze medalist(s)	Zhixiao Sun	M76	China	14.45

==== M80 100 metres ====
Wind: +4.7

Pos	Athlete	Age	Country	Result
1st place, gold medalist(s)	Tony Bowman	M81	Great Britain	14.85
2nd place, silver medalist(s)	Jostein Haraldseid	M81	Norway	15.64
3rd place, bronze medalist(s)	Robert Cozens	M80	United States	15.65

==== M85 100 metres ====
Wind: +1.2

Pos	Athlete	Age	Country	Result
1st place, gold medalist(s)	Hiroo Tanaka	M85	Japan	15.82
2nd place, silver medalist(s)	Michel Claverie	M86	France	16.80
3rd place, bronze medalist(s)	Leo Coffey	M86	Australia	19.45

==== M90 100 metres ====
Wind: +2.1

Pos	Athlete	Age	Country	Result
1st place, gold medalist(s)	Hugo Ant Delgado Flores	M92	Peru	20.14
2nd place, silver medalist(s)	James Sinclair	M92	Australia	20.61
3rd place, bronze medalist(s)	Dalbir Deol Singh	M90	Great Britain	21.30

==== M95 100 metres ====
Wind: +2.1

Pos	Athlete	Age	Country	Result
1st place, gold medalist(s)	Arthur Carbon	M96	Australia	35.55

=== 200 metres ===
==== M35 200 metres ====
Wind: +2.5

Pos	Athlete	Age	Country	Result
1st place, gold medalist(s)	Richard Beardsell	M37	Great Britain	21.76
2nd place, silver medalist(s)	Pablo Miñarro Martínez	M35	Spain	21.94
3rd place, bronze medalist(s)	Sean Burnett	M35	United States	21.96

==== M40 200 metres ====
Wind: +1.7

Pos	Athlete	Age	Country	Result
1st place, gold medalist(s)	Tamunonengiye-Ofo Ossai	M41	Great Britain	21.81
2nd place, silver medalist(s)	Ashley McMahon	M41	Australia	22.05
3rd place, bronze medalist(s)	Antwon Dussett	M41	United States	22.14

==== M45 200 metres ====
Wind: +4.1

Pos	Athlete	Age	Country	Result
1st place, gold medalist(s)	Bernd Schauwecker	M47	Germany	22.57
2nd place, silver medalist(s)	Shinichiro Ito	M45	Japan	22.68
3rd place, bronze medalist(s)	Thomas Keßler	M46	Germany	22.82

==== M50 200 metres ====
Wind: +3.2

Pos	Athlete	Age	Country	Result
1st place, gold medalist(s)	Roland Groeger	M52	Germany	22.97
2nd place, silver medalist(s)	Robert Thomas	M50	United States	23.40
3rd place, bronze medalist(s)	Meinert Möller	M50	Germany	23.41

==== M55 200 metres ====
Wind: +1.4

Pos	Athlete	Age	Country	Result
1st place, gold medalist(s)	Don McGee	M56	United States	24.44
2nd place, silver medalist(s)	David Isackson	M55	Australia	24.60
3rd place, bronze medalist(s)	Rudy Kocis	M55	Australia	24.61

==== M60 200 metres ====
Wind: +2.3

Pos	Athlete	Age	Country	Result
1st place, gold medalist(s)	Steve Peters	M63	Great Britain	24.11
2nd place, silver medalist(s)	Gerhard Zorn	M60	Germany	24.63
3rd place, bronze medalist(s)	Ryoichi Oe	M62	Japan	25.31

==== M65 200 metres ====
Wind: +3.3

Pos	Athlete	Age	Country	Result
1st place, gold medalist(s)	Bill Collins	M65	United States	25.55
2nd place, silver medalist(s)	Mario Soru	M65	Italy	26.21
3rd place, bronze medalist(s)	Wojciech Seidel	M66	Poland	26.45

==== M70 200 metres ====
Wind: +1.8

Pos	Athlete	Age	Country	Result
1st place, gold medalist(s)	Peter Crombie	M71	Australia	27.00
2nd place, silver medalist(s)	Roberto Paesani	M70	Italy	27.55
3rd place, bronze medalist(s)	Trevor Guptill	M70	New Zealand	27.98

==== M75 200 metres ====
Wind: +3.0

Pos	Athlete	Age	Country	Result
1st place, gold medalist(s)	Barrie Kernaghan	M76	Australia	29.48
2nd place, silver medalist(s)	Hermann Beckering	M77	Germany	29.84
3rd place, bronze medalist(s)	Zhixiao Sun	M76	China	30.81

==== M80 200 metres ====
Wind: +3.0

Pos	Athlete	Age	Country	Result
1st place, gold medalist(s)	Robert Cozens	M80	United States	31.86
2nd place, silver medalist(s)	Tony Bowman	M81	Great Britain	31.90
3rd place, bronze medalist(s)	Horst Hufnagel	M81	Germany	34.38

==== M85 200 metres ====
Wind: +2.4

Pos	Athlete	Age	Country	Result
1st place, gold medalist(s)	Michel Claverie	M86	France	39.80
2nd place, silver medalist(s)	Heinz Ebermann	M85	Germany	41.03
3rd place, bronze medalist(s)	Konstan Chatziemmanouil	M87	Greece	43.36

==== M90 200 metres ====
Wind: +3.1

Pos	Athlete	Age	Country	Result
1st place, gold medalist(s)	Hugo Ant Delgado Flores	M92	Peru	44.49
2nd place, silver medalist(s)	James Sinclair	M92	Australia	44.87
3rd place, bronze medalist(s)	Dalbir Deol Singh	M90	Great Britain	48.77

==== M95 200 metres ====
Wind: +3.1

Pos	Athlete	Age	Country	Result
1st place, gold medalist(s)	Arthur Carbon	M96	Australia	1:07.70

=== 400 metres ===
==== M35 400 metres ====
Pos	Athlete	Age	Country	Result
1st place, gold medalist(s)	Richard Beardsell	M37	Great Britain	48.53
2nd place, silver medalist(s)	Clemente Alavés José Lu	M35	Spain	48.98
3rd place, bronze medalist(s)	Jay Stone	M36	Australia	49.58

==== M40 400 metres ====
Pos	Athlete	Age	Country	Result
1st place, gold medalist(s)	Antwon Dussett	M41	United States	49.17
2nd place, silver medalist(s)	Cameron Yorke	M40	Australia	50.68
3rd place, bronze medalist(s)	Dan Lemoto	M40	Australia	50.73

==== M45 400 metres ====
Pos	Athlete	Age	Country	Result
1st place, gold medalist(s)	Mark Gomes	M45	United States	50.60
2nd place, silver medalist(s)	Bernd Schauwecker	M47	Germany	51.41
3rd place, bronze medalist(s)	Mattias Sunneborn	M46	Sweden	51.99

==== M50 400 metres ====
Pos	Athlete	Age	Country	Result
1st place, gold medalist(s)	Roland Groeger	M52	Germany	51.41
2nd place, silver medalist(s)	Robert Thomas	M50	United States	53.13
3rd place, bronze medalist(s)	Meinert Möller	M50	Germany	53.58

==== M55 400 metres ====
Pos	Athlete	Age	Country	Result
1st place, gold medalist(s)	Corey Moody	M55	United States	55.28
2nd place, silver medalist(s)	Trevor Young	M58	Australia	55.33
3rd place, bronze medalist(s)	Richard White	M56	Great Britain	55.83

==== M60 400 metres ====
Pos	Athlete	Age	Country	Result
1st place, gold medalist(s)	Gerhard Zorn	M60	Germany	55.03
2nd place, silver medalist(s)	David Elderfield	M60	Great Britain	56.55
3rd place, bronze medalist(s)	Reinhard Michelchen	M62	Germany	57.75

==== M65 400 metres ====
Pos	Athlete	Age	Country	Result
1st place, gold medalist(s)	Karl Dorschner	M65	Germany	58.93
2nd place, silver medalist(s)	Mario Soru	M65	Italy	1:00.45
3rd place, bronze medalist(s)	John Lamb	M67	Australia	1:00.69

==== M70 400 metres ====
Pos	Athlete	Age	Country	Result
1st place, gold medalist(s)	Peter Crombie	M71	Australia	1:01.13
2nd place, silver medalist(s)	Roberto Paesani	M70	Italy	1:01.41
3rd place, bronze medalist(s)	Noel Haynes	M70	United States	1:02.45

==== M75 400 metres ====
Pos	Athlete	Age	Country	Result
1st place, gold medalist(s)	Hermann Beckering	M77	Germany	1:08.50
2nd place, silver medalist(s)	Barrie Kernaghan	M76	Australia	1:09.30
3rd place, bronze medalist(s)	Jean-Louis Esnault	M76	France	1:11.34

==== M80 400 metres ====
Pos	Athlete	Age	Country	Result
1st place, gold medalist(s)	Robert Cozens	M80	United States	1:18.58
2nd place, silver medalist(s)	Jose Ludueña Teobaldo	M80	Argentina	1:21.55
3rd place, bronze medalist(s)	Darmiyanto Darmiyanto	M80	Indonesia	1:22.41

==== M85 400 metres ====
Pos	Athlete	Age	Country	Result
1st place, gold medalist(s)	Heinz Ebermann	M85	Germany	1:40.49
2nd place, silver medalist(s)	Konstan Chatziemmanouil	M87	Greece	1:43.70
3rd place, bronze medalist(s)	Guiben Sun	M87	China	1:43.74

==== M90 400 metres ====
Pos	Athlete	Age	Country	Result
1st place, gold medalist(s)	Dalbir Deol Singh	M90	Great Britain	1:57.83
2nd place, silver medalist(s)	Zhiyong Wang	M92	China	2:28.08
3rd place, bronze medalist(s)	Dumitru Radu	M90	Romania	3:35.12

==== M95 400 metres ====
Pos	Athlete	Age	Country	Result
1st place, gold medalist(s)	Arthur Carbon	M96	Australia	3:30.92

=== 800 metres ===
==== M35 800 metres ====
Pos	Athlete	Age	Country	Result
1st place, gold medalist(s)	Perez Pous Juan Ramon	M37	Spain	1:54.38
2nd place, silver medalist(s)	Juan Gil Antonio	M37	Spain	1:54.87
3rd place, bronze medalist(s)	Joseph Boland	M38	Canada	1:55.10

==== M40 800 metres ====
Pos	Athlete	Age	Country	Result
1st place, gold medalist(s)	Christophe Chevaux	M41	France	2:00.45
2nd place, silver medalist(s)	Gary Howard	M42	Australia	2:01.40
3rd place, bronze medalist(s)	Nathan Crowley	M43	Australia	2:01.89

==== M45 800 metres ====
Pos	Athlete	Age	Country	Result
1st place, gold medalist(s)	Mike Toal	M45	Great Britain	2:03.05
2nd place, silver medalist(s)	Craig Sanford	M48	Australia	2:04.00
3rd place, bronze medalist(s)	Robert Cepek	M48	Czech Republic	2:04.71

==== M50 800 metres ====
Pos	Athlete	Age	Country	Result
1st place, gold medalist(s)	Francisco D'Agostino	M50	Italy	2:05.84
2nd place, silver medalist(s)	Landen Summay	M51	United States	2:05.89
3rd place, bronze medalist(s)	Richard Polkinghorne	M51	Australia	2:06.68

==== M55 800 metres ====
Pos	Athlete	Age	Country	Result
1st place, gold medalist(s)	Ian Calder	M59	New Zealand	2:15.34
2nd place, silver medalist(s)	Andrew Egginton	M55	Australia	2:16.25
3rd place, bronze medalist(s)	Peter Fitzgerald	M55	New Zealand	2:17.35

==== M60 800 metres ====
Pos	Athlete	Age	Country	Result
1st place, gold medalist(s)	Peter Hawes	M60	Australia	2:18.46
2nd place, silver medalist(s)	Oleksandr Lysenko	M61	Ukraine	2:20.80
3rd place, bronze medalist(s)	Michael Barrand	M64	Australia	2:23.22

==== M65 800 metres ====
Pos	Athlete	Age	Country	Result
1st place, gold medalist(s)	Londono Loaiza Carlos H	M65	Colombia	2:24.19
2nd place, silver medalist(s)	Hans Smeets	M69	Netherlands	2:25.93
3rd place, bronze medalist(s)	Leonard Claassen John	M65	South Africa	2:26.15

==== M70 800 metres ====
Pos	Athlete	Age	Country	Result
1st place, gold medalist(s)	Noel Haynes	M70	United States	2:29.38
2nd place, silver medalist(s)	Jean Demarque Claude	M70	France	2:30.42
3rd place, bronze medalist(s)	Gary Patton	M70	United States	2:34.13

==== M75 800 metres ====
Pos	Athlete	Age	Country	Result
1st place, gold medalist(s)	Jean-Louis Esnault	M76	France	2:40.41
2nd place, silver medalist(s)	Peter Sandery	M75	Australia	2:49.16
3rd place, bronze medalist(s)	Hartmann Knorr	M76	Germany	2:56.60

==== M80 800 metres ====
Pos	Athlete	Age	Country	Result
1st place, gold medalist(s)	Rodney Mills	M80	Great Britain	3:08.53
2nd place, silver medalist(s)	David Carr	M84	Australia	3:09.26
3rd place, bronze medalist(s)	Jose Ludueña Teobaldo	M80	Argentina	3:15.05

==== M85 800 metres ====
Pos	Athlete	Age	Country	Result
1st place, gold medalist(s)	Hiroo Tanaka	M85	Japan	3:25.36
2nd place, silver medalist(s)	Heinz Ebermann	M85	Germany	3:43.96
3rd place, bronze medalist(s)	Christian Larcher	M86	France	4:08.15

==== M90 800 metres ====
Pos	Athlete	Age	Country	Result
1st place, gold medalist(s)	Dumitru Radu	M90	Romania	8:59.53

==== M95 800 metres ====
Pos	Athlete	Age	Country	Result
1st place, gold medalist(s)	John Gilmour	M97	Australia	9:19.93

=== 1500 metres ===
==== M35 1500 metres ====
Pos	Athlete	Age	Country	Result
1st place, gold medalist(s)	Khattabi Louah Abdeslam	M35	Spain	3:54.75
2nd place, silver medalist(s)	Scott Tamblin	M37	Australia	3:56.50
3rd place, bronze medalist(s)	Brett Halls	M38	Australia	3:56.86

==== M40 1500 metres ====
Pos	Athlete	Age	Country	Result
1st place, gold medalist(s)	Christophe Chevaux	M41	France	4:10.59
2nd place, silver medalist(s)	Bronislav Khyr	M41	Czech Republic	4:11.00
3rd place, bronze medalist(s)	Robert Celinski Mirosla	M43	Poland	4:11.14

==== M45 1500 metres ====
Pos	Athlete	Age	Country	Result
1st place, gold medalist(s)	Miles Smith	M45	United States	4:19.31
2nd place, silver medalist(s)	António Costa	M47	Portugal	4:19.32
3rd place, bronze medalist(s)	Philip Noden	M46	Australia	4:20.80

==== M50 1500 metres ====
Pos	Athlete	Age	Country	Result
1st place, gold medalist(s)	Paul Osland	M52	Canada	4:16.34
2nd place, silver medalist(s)	Robert Schwerkolt	M50	Australia	4:16.99
3rd place, bronze medalist(s)	Simon Anderson	M52	Great Britain	4:17.00

==== M55 1500 metres ====
Pos	Athlete	Age	Country	Result
1st place, gold medalist(s)	Stuart Galloway	M55	Canada	4:34.33
2nd place, silver medalist(s)	Ian Calder	M59	New Zealand	4:35.90
3rd place, bronze medalist(s)	Alex Stienstra	M57	Netherlands	4:36.06

==== M60 1500 metres ====
Pos	Athlete	Age	Country	Result
1st place, gold medalist(s)	Oleksandr Lysenko	M61	Ukraine	4:45.80
2nd place, silver medalist(s)	Alan Gower	M61	Australia	4:45.96
3rd place, bronze medalist(s)	Sono Masao	M62	Japan	4:58.08

==== M65 1500 metres ====
Pos	Athlete	Age	Country	Result
1st place, gold medalist(s)	Londono Loaiza Carlos H	M65	Colombia	5:01.16
2nd place, silver medalist(s)	Hans Smeets	M69	Netherlands	5:01.96
3rd place, bronze medalist(s)	David Oxland	M65	Great Britain	5:03.95

==== M70 1500 metres ====
Pos	Athlete	Age	Country	Result
1st place, gold medalist(s)	Jean Demarque Claude	M70	France	4:59.60
2nd place, silver medalist(s)	Donald Mathewson	M72	Australia	5:03.48
3rd place, bronze medalist(s)	Gary Patton	M70	United States	5:04.87

==== M75 1500 metres ====
Pos	Athlete	Age	Country	Result
1st place, gold medalist(s)	Jean-Louis Esnault	M76	France	5:35.90
2nd place, silver medalist(s)	Albert Carse	M75	Australia	5:42.87
3rd place, bronze medalist(s)	Peter Sandery	M75	Australia	5:49.57

==== M80 1500 metres ====
Pos	Athlete	Age	Country	Result
1st place, gold medalist(s)	Roger Bardin	M80	France	7:03.97
2nd place, silver medalist(s)	Ryosuke Takahara	M81	Japan	7:10.77
3rd place, bronze medalist(s)	Max Brook	M80	Australia	7:27.90

==== M85 1500 metres ====
Pos	Athlete	Age	Country	Result
1st place, gold medalist(s)	Heinz Ebermann	M85	Germany	8:23.06
2nd place, silver medalist(s)	Christian Larcher	M86	France	8:24.64
3rd place, bronze medalist(s)	Guiben Sun	M87	China	8:53.66

==== M90 1500 metres ====
Pos	Athlete	Age	Country	Result
1st place, gold medalist(s)	Zhiyong Wang	M92	China	11:02.56

==== M95 1500 metres ====
Pos	Athlete	Age	Country	Result
1st place, gold medalist(s)	John Gilmour	M97	Australia	19:35.95

=== 5000 metres ===
==== M35 5000 metres ====
Pos	Athlete	Age	Country	Result
1st place, gold medalist(s)	Michal Bernardelli	M36	Poland	15:13.53
2nd place, silver medalist(s)	Luigi Del Buono	M37	Italy	15:19.78
3rd place, bronze medalist(s)	Scott Tamblin	M37	Australia	15:23.77

==== M40 5000 metres ====
Pos	Athlete	Age	Country	Result
1st place, gold medalist(s)	Roberto Busi	M40	Australia	14:46.60
2nd place, silver medalist(s)	Martin San La De Fuente	M41	Spain	15:49.57
3rd place, bronze medalist(s)	Robert Celinski Mirosla	M43	Poland	15:54.59

==== M45 5000 metres ====
Pos	Athlete	Age	Country	Result
1st place, gold medalist(s)	Patrick Kwist	M47	Netherlands	15:37.55
2nd place, silver medalist(s)	Cesar Troncoso	M49	Argentina	15:56.88
3rd place, bronze medalist(s)	António Costa	M47	Portugal	16:18.24

==== M50 5000 metres ====
Pos	Athlete	Age	Country	Result
1st place, gold medalist(s)	Ben Reynolds	M52	Great Britain	16:01.64
2nd place, silver medalist(s)	Anders Dahl	M51	Sweden	16:13.66
3rd place, bronze medalist(s)	Bruce Graham	M54	Australia	16:14.40

==== M55 5000 metres ====
Pos	Athlete	Age	Country	Result
1st place, gold medalist(s)	David Sweeney	M55	Australia	16:43.07
2nd place, silver medalist(s)	Alex Stienstra	M57	Netherlands	17:05.76
3rd place, bronze medalist(s)	Stuart Galloway	M55	Canada	17:09.20

==== M60 5000 metres ====
Pos	Athlete	Age	Country	Result
1st place, gold medalist(s)	Paul Thompson	M60	Great Britain	18:28.86
2nd place, silver medalist(s)	Tony Price	M60	New Zealand	18:30.59
3rd place, bronze medalist(s)	Alan Gower	M61	Australia	18:32.49

==== M65 5000 metres ====
Pos	Athlete	Age	Country	Result
1st place, gold medalist(s)	Peter Mullin	M65	United States	18:45.61
2nd place, silver medalist(s)	David Oxland	M65	Great Britain	18:47.75
3rd place, bronze medalist(s)	Bert Schalkwijk	M68	Netherlands	18:57.32

==== M70 5000 metres ====
Pos	Athlete	Age	Country	Result
1st place, gold medalist(s)	Jean Demarque Claude	M70	France	19:22.39
2nd place, silver medalist(s)	Donald Mathewson	M72	Australia	19:39.06
3rd place, bronze medalist(s)	Gary Patton	M70	United States	19:54.27

==== M75 5000 metres ====
Pos	Athlete	Age	Country	Result
1st place, gold medalist(s)	Jean-Louis Esnault	M76	France	20:46.11
2nd place, silver medalist(s)	Albert Carse	M75	Australia	20:52.43
3rd place, bronze medalist(s)	Peter Sandery	M75	Australia	21:04.92

==== M80 5000 metres ====
Pos	Athlete	Age	Country	Result
1st place, gold medalist(s)	Roger Bardin	M80	France	26:10.89
2nd place, silver medalist(s)	Ryosuke Takahara	M81	Japan	27:12.67
3rd place, bronze medalist(s)	Livio Guzman	M82	Peru	29:01.63

==== M85 5000 metres ====
Pos	Athlete	Age	Country	Result
1st place, gold medalist(s)	Christian Larcher	M86	France	30:55.07
2nd place, silver medalist(s)	Irwin Barrett-Lennard	M87	Australia	33:02.97
3rd place, bronze medalist(s)	Cecil Walkley	M87	Australia	58:17.41

==== M90 5000 metres ====
Pos	Athlete	Age	Country	Result
1st place, gold medalist(s)	Zhiyong Wang	M92	China	38:25.89
2nd place, silver medalist(s)	Dumitru Radu	M90	Romania	1:04:23.92

=== Cross country ===
==== M35 8000 metres Cross Country ====
Pos	Athlete	Age	Country	Result
1st place, gold medalist(s)	Michal Bernardelli	M36	Poland	25:46.90
2nd place, silver medalist(s)	Luigi Del Buono	M37	Italy	25:50.21
3rd place, bronze medalist(s)	Scott Tamblin	M37	Australia	25:51.97

==== M40 8000 metres Cross Country ====
Pos	Athlete	Age	Country	Result
1st place, gold medalist(s)	Martin San La De Fuente	M41	Spain	26:29.55
2nd place, silver medalist(s)	Robert Celinski Mirosla	M43	Poland	26:59.21
3rd place, bronze medalist(s)	Todd Ingraham	M42	Australia	27:32.48

==== M45 8000 metres Cross Country ====
Pos	Athlete	Age	Country	Result
1st place, gold medalist(s)	Cesar Troncoso	M49	Argentina	26:38.31
2nd place, silver medalist(s)	António Costa	M47	Portugal	27:20.40
3rd place, bronze medalist(s)	Jason Cameron	M45	New Zealand	27:38.46

==== M50 8000 metres Cross Country ====
Pos	Athlete	Age	Country	Result
1st place, gold medalist(s)	Bruce Graham	M54	Australia	27:14.38
2nd place, silver medalist(s)	Paul Thompson	M50	Great Britain	27:17.56
3rd place, bronze medalist(s)	Anders Dahl	M51	Sweden	27:22.28

==== M55 8000 metres Cross Country ====
Pos	Athlete	Age	Country	Result
1st place, gold medalist(s)	David Sweeney	M55	Australia	27:18.78
2nd place, silver medalist(s)	Trevor Scott	M57	Australia	29:12.28
3rd place, bronze medalist(s)	Cauteren Van Toon	M55	Belgium	29:21.19

==== M60 8000 metres Cross Country ====
Pos	Athlete	Age	Country	Result
1st place, gold medalist(s)	Alan Gower	M61	Australia	30:30.74
2nd place, silver medalist(s)	Tony Price	M60	New Zealand	30:36.48
3rd place, bronze medalist(s)	Jose Del Riaño Ramirez	M61	Colombia	30:39.73

==== M65 8000 metres Cross Country ====
Pos	Athlete	Age	Country	Result
1st place, gold medalist(s)	John Skelton	M65	Great Britain	31:04.73
2nd place, silver medalist(s)	David Oxland	M65	Great Britain	31:41.42
3rd place, bronze medalist(s)	Joachim Krüttgen	M65	Germany	31:52.28

==== M70 8000 metres Cross Country ====
Pos	Athlete	Age	Country	Result
1st place, gold medalist(s)	DonaldMathewson	M72	Australia	34:25.12
2nd place, silver medalist(s)	Jim Langford	M72	Australia	34:34.17
3rd place, bronze medalist(s)	Martin Ford	M73	Great Britain	34:48.72

==== M75 8000 metres Cross Country ====
Pos	Athlete	Age	Country	Result
1st place, gold medalist(s)	Ron Robertson	M75	New Zealand	35:16.16
2nd place, silver medalist(s)	Peter Sandery	M75	Australia	36:03.20
3rd place, bronze medalist(s)	Jean-Louis Esnault	M76	France	36:37.90

==== M80 8000 metres Cross Country ====
Pos	Athlete	Age	Country	Result
1st place, gold medalist(s)	Roger Bardin	M80	France	47:39.89
2nd place, silver medalist(s)	Ryosuke Takahara	M81	Japan	47:41.29
3rd place, bronze medalist(s)	Livio Guzman	M82	Peru	48:29.13

==== M85 8000 metres Cross Country ====
Pos	Athlete	Age	Country	Result
1st place, gold medalist(s)	Christian Larcher	M86	France	40:26.61
2nd place, silver medalist(s)	Irwin Barrett-Lennard	M87	Australia	54:48.06

==== M90 8000 metres Cross Country ====
Pos	Athlete	Age	Country	Result
1st place, gold medalist(s)	Dumitru Radu	M90	Romania	1:42:11.69

=== 10,000 metres ===
==== M35 10000 metres ====
Pos	Athlete	Age	Country	Result
1st place, gold medalist(s)	Michal Bernardelli	M36	Poland	31:53.43
2nd place, silver medalist(s)	Luigi Del Buono	M37	Italy	32:45.99
3rd place, bronze medalist(s)	Vladimir Srb	M37	Czech Republic	32:53.92

==== M40 10000 metres ====
Pos	Athlete	Age	Country	Result
1st place, gold medalist(s)	Roberto Busi	M40	Australia	30:58.37
2nd place, silver medalist(s)	Martin San La De Fuente	M41	Spain	33:05.49
3rd place, bronze medalist(s)	Robert Celinski Mirosla	M43	Poland	33:09.31

==== M45 10000 metres ====
Pos	Athlete	Age	Country	Result
1st place, gold medalist(s)	Joshua Kipchumba	M47	Kenya	31:40.16
2nd place, silver medalist(s)	Cesar Troncoso	M49	Argentina	32:04.42
3rd place, bronze medalist(s)	Patrick Kwist	M47	Netherlands	32:10.29

==== M50 10000 metres ====
Pos	Athlete	Age	Country	Result
1st place, gold medalist(s)	Paul Yego Kibet	M51	Kenya	33:13.34
2nd place, silver medalist(s)	Ben Reynolds	M52	Great Britain	33:19.16
3rd place, bronze medalist(s)	Bruce Graham	M54	Australia	33:48.89

==== M55 10000 metres ====
Pos	Athlete	Age	Country	Result
1st place, gold medalist(s)	David Sweeney	M55	Australia	33:15.16
2nd place, silver medalist(s)	Gerry Oldfield	M56	Australia	35:39.43
3rd place, bronze medalist(s)	Chris Maher	M55	Australia	35:44.07

==== M60 10000 metres ====
Pos	Athlete	Age	Country	Result
1st place, gold medalist(s)	Dennis Wylie	M63	New Zealand	39:41.75
2nd place, silver medalist(s)	Jose Del Riaño Ramirez	M61	Colombia	39:44.44
3rd place, bronze medalist(s)	Joseph Koskei Some	M62	Kenya	39:45.73

==== M65 10000 metres ====
Pos	Athlete	Age	Country	Result
1st place, gold medalist(s)	Joachim Krüttgen	M65	Germany	39:33.65
2nd place, silver medalist(s)	John Skelton	M65	Great Britain	39:50.46
3rd place, bronze medalist(s)	Omar Fahuas	M65	Chile	40:04.50

==== M70 10000 metres ====
Pos	Athlete	Age	Country	Result
1st place, gold medalist(s)	Jean Demarque Claude	M70	France	41:26.68
2nd place, silver medalist(s)	Shigemichi Nakazawa	M70	Japan	43:32.86
3rd place, bronze medalist(s)	Martin Ford	M73	Great Britain	44:20.82

==== M75 10000 metres ====
Pos	Athlete	Age	Country	Result
1st place, gold medalist(s)	Jean-Louis Esnault	M76	France	44:51.35
2nd place, silver medalist(s)	Peter Lessing	M75	Germany	47:27.23
3rd place, bronze medalist(s)	Peter Sandery	M75	Australia	47:57.70

==== M80 10000 metres ====
Pos	Athlete	Age	Country	Result
1st place, gold medalist(s)	Livio Guzman	M82	Peru	1:04:51.68
2nd place, silver medalist(s)	Ruiz Reyes Rosario	M80	Mexico	1:07:44.61
3rd place, bronze medalist(s)	Daniel Boiziau	M81	France	1:15:08.20

==== M85 10000 metres ====
Pos	Athlete	Age	Country	Result
1st place, gold medalist(s)	Christian Larcher	M86	France	1:07:55.22
2nd place, silver medalist(s)	Irwin Barrett-Lennard	M87	Australia	1:09:17.44

==== M90 10000 metres ====
Pos	Athlete	Age	Country	Result
1st place, gold medalist(s)	Zhiyong Wang	M92	China	1:31:27.39

=== Half marathon ===
==== M35 Half marathon ====
Pos	Athlete	Age	Country	Result
1st place, gold medalist(s)	Vladimir Srb	M37	Czech Republic	1:13:14
2nd place, silver medalist(s)	Ross Langford	M38	Australia	1:18:08
3rd place, bronze medalist(s)	Gavin Anderson	M35	Great Britain	1:20:51

==== M40 Half marathon ====
Pos	Athlete	Age	Country	Result
1st place, gold medalist(s)	Francis Komu	M42	Kenya	1:11:07
2nd place, silver medalist(s)	John Birgen	M42	Kenya	1:11:20
3rd place, bronze medalist(s)	Philip Metto	M41	Kenya	1:11:29

==== M45 Half marathon ====
Pos	Athlete	Age	Country	Result
1st place, gold medalist(s)	Davide Figueiredo	M45	Portugal	1:11:42
2nd place, silver medalist(s)	John Sang	M46	Kenya	1:12:19
3rd place, bronze medalist(s)	Patrick Kwist	M47	Netherlands	1:12:52

==== M50 Half marathon ====
Pos	Athlete	Age	Country	Result
1st place, gold medalist(s)	Paul Thompson	M50	Great Britain	1:12:48R
2nd place, silver medalist(s)	Bruce Graham	M54	Australia	1:14:58
3rd place, bronze medalist(s)	John Meagher	M53	Australia	1:15:59

==== M55 Half marathon ====
Pos	Athlete	Age	Country	Result
1st place, gold medalist(s)	David Sweeney	M55	Australia	1:13:42R
2nd place, silver medalist(s)	Stephen Kihara	M55	Kenya	1:15:15
3rd place, bronze medalist(s)	Gerry Oldfield	M56	Australia	1:19:34

==== M60 Half marathon ====
Pos	Athlete	Age	Country	Result
1st place, gold medalist(s)	Paul Thompson	M60	Great Britain	1:23:01
2nd place, silver medalist(s)	Stephen Kamande	M64	Kenya	1:27:39
3rd place, bronze medalist(s)	Dennis Wylie	M63	New Zealand	1:29:42

==== M65 Half marathon ====
Pos	Athlete	Age	Country	Result
1st place, gold medalist(s)	Joachim Krüttgen	M65	Germany	1:25:33
2nd place, silver medalist(s)	Omar Fahuas	M65	Chile	1:26:42
3rd place, bronze medalist(s)	Heimo Kärkkäinen	M65	Finland	1:28:40

==== M70 Half marathon ====
Pos	Athlete	Age	Country	Result
1st place, gold medalist(s)	Jean Demarque Claude	M70	France	1:31:34R
2nd place, silver medalist(s)	Albert Anderegg	M71	Switzerland	1:32:20
3rd place, bronze medalist(s)	Martin Ford	M73	Great Britain	1:37:28

==== M75 Half marathon ====
Pos	Athlete	Age	Country	Result
1st place, gold medalist(s)	Peter Lessing	M75	Germany	1:47:18
2nd place, silver medalist(s)	Albert Carse	M75	Australia	1:54:04
3rd place, bronze medalist(s)	Harry Fletcher	M75	Zimbabwe	1:59:15

==== M80 Half marathon ====
Pos	Athlete	Age	Country	Result
1st place, gold medalist(s)	Roger Bardin	M80	France	2:12:53R
2nd place, silver medalist(s)	Alwyn Barnesby	M81	Australia	2:47:59
3rd place, bronze medalist(s)	John Hines	M80	New Zealand	2:59:23

==== M85 Half marathon ====
Pos	Athlete	Age	Country	Result
1st place, gold medalist(s)	Christian Larcher	M86	France	2:28:44

=== Marathon ===
==== M35 Marathon ====
Pos	Athlete	Age	Country	Result
1st place, gold medalist(s)	Davy Acke	M36	Belgium	2:38:26
2nd place, silver medalist(s)	Bartosz Mazerski	M39	Poland	2:48:42
3rd place, bronze medalist(s)	Koji Kawamoto	M39	Japan	2:49:22

==== M40 Marathon ====
Pos	Athlete	Age	Country	Result
1st place, gold medalist(s)	Wayne Spies	M44	Australia	2:34:46
2nd place, silver medalist(s)	Grzegorz Gronostaj	M41	Poland	2:35:56
3rd place, bronze medalist(s)	Damien Bruneau	M40	Australia	2:37:26

==== M45 Marathon ====
Pos	Athlete	Age	Country	Result
1st place, gold medalist(s)	Jean-Marie Bercegeay	M45	France	2:43:36
2nd place, silver medalist(s)	Kevin Matthews	M49	Australia	2:44:31
3rd place, bronze medalist(s)	Darren Purcell	M46	Australia	2:48:10

==== M50 Marathon ====
Pos	Athlete	Age	Country	Result
1st place, gold medalist(s)	Clemens Schmitt	M51	Australia	2:47:22
2nd place, silver medalist(s)	Raymond Wareham	M50	Australia	2:48:22
3rd place, bronze medalist(s)	Robbie Barnes	M53	New Zealand	2:54:28

==== M55 Marathon ====
Pos	Athlete	Age	Country	Result
1st place, gold medalist(s)	Sánchez Vázquez Juan	M55	Spain	2:39:04
2nd place, silver medalist(s)	Josep Batalla Boada	M55	Spain	2:56:07
3rd place, bronze medalist(s)	Kazunori Shimizu	M55	Japan	3:06:52

==== M60 Marathon ====
Pos	Athlete	Age	Country	Result
1st place, gold medalist(s)	John Shaw	M63	Australia	2:55:42
2nd place, silver medalist(s)	Alvaro Diez	M60	Spain	2:57:20
3rd place, bronze medalist(s)	Bogdan Barewski	M62	Poland	3:08:01

==== M65 Marathon ====
Pos	Athlete	Age	Country	Result
1st place, gold medalist(s)	Antoni Cichonczuk	M66	Poland	3:11:08
2nd place, silver medalist(s)	Ian Kitching	M65	Great Britain	3:25:40
3rd place, bronze medalist(s)	José Ribeiro	M65	Portugal	3:28:36

==== M70 Marathon ====
Pos	Athlete	Age	Country	Result
1st place, gold medalist(s)	Gabriel Garcia	M70	Brazil	3:40:27
2nd place, silver medalist(s)	Saltanat Tuitebayev	M71	Kazakhstan	3:46:11
3rd place, bronze medalist(s)	Dietrich Wittmershaus	M70	Germany	3:56:52

==== M75 Marathon ====
Pos	Athlete	Age	Country	Result
1st place, gold medalist(s)	Sean Cooney	M76	Ireland	4:19:53
2nd place, silver medalist(s)	Serge Notebaert	M76	France	4:31:55
3rd place, bronze medalist(s)	Heiko Schaefer	M77	Australia	5:04:59

==== M85 Marathon ====
Pos	Athlete	Age	Country	Result
1st place, gold medalist(s)	Michio Kumamoto	M85	Japan	4:48:18

=== Short hurdles ===
==== M70 80 metres hurdles ====
Wind: +0.9

Pos	Athlete	Age	Country	Result
1st place, gold medalist(s)	Klaus Wucherer	M72	Germany	14.13
2nd place, silver medalist(s)	Mehmet Murat Kacar	M70	Turkey	14.31
3rd place, bronze medalist(s)	Yuan-Chung Hsu	M74	Chinese Taipei	14.54

==== M75 80 metres hurdles ====
Wind: -0.3

Pos	Athlete	Age	Country	Result
1st place, gold medalist(s)	Takehiro Yasui	M75	Japan	13.67
2nd place, silver medalist(s)	Michael Stevenson	M76	Australia	15.25
3rd place, bronze medalist(s)	Zhixiao Sun	M76	China	17.61

==== M80 80 metres hurdles ====
Wind: -0.1

Pos	Athlete	Age	Country	Result
1st place, gold medalist(s)	Tony Bowman	M81	Great Britain	15.15
2nd place, silver medalist(s)	Kjartan Sølvberg	M80	Norway	16.42
3rd place, bronze medalist(s)	Jostein Haraldseid	M81	Norway	17.09

==== M85 80 metres hurdles ====
Wind: -0.4

Pos	Athlete	Age	Country	Result
1st place, gold medalist(s)	Ake Lund	M86	Finland	21.74
2nd place, silver medalist(s)	Munehiro Toriya	M87	Japan	28.67

==== M50 100 metres hurdles ====
Wind: +0.5

Pos	Athlete	Age	Country	Result
1st place, gold medalist(s)	Angel Est Granillo Díaz	M54	Guatemala	14.39
2nd place, silver medalist(s)	Donald Brown	M53	Great Britain	14.72
3rd place, bronze medalist(s)	Roberto Amerio	M51	Italy	15.72

==== M55 100 metres hurdles ====
Wind: -0.3

Pos	Athlete	Age	Country	Result
1st place, gold medalist(s)	Tetsushi Yamashita	M55	Japan	15.72
2nd place, silver medalist(s)	Eugene Anton	M58	United States	15.98
3rd place, bronze medalist(s)	Luis Huarcaya	M57	Peru	16.28

==== M60 100 metres hurdles ====
Wind: -0.7

Pos	Athlete	Age	Country	Result
1st place, gold medalist(s)	Herbert Kreiner	M61	Austria	15.87
2nd place, silver medalist(s)	Peter Pach	M64	Germany	16.73
3rd place, bronze medalist(s)	Jordi Blanch	M60	Spain	16.93

==== M65 100 metres hurdles ====
Wind: +0.9

Pos	Athlete	Age	Country	Result
1st place, gold medalist(s)	Jürgen Hacker	M68	Germany	16.98
2nd place, silver medalist(s)	Sylwester Lorenz	M65	Poland	17.02
3rd place, bronze medalist(s)	Bernardino Uribe	M69	Chile	19.28

==== M35 110 metres hurdles ====
Wind: +0.1

Pos	Athlete	Age	Country	Result
1st place, gold medalist(s)	Christophe Emica	M37	France	14.65
2nd place, silver medalist(s)	Jackson Hinton	M35	Canada	14.86
3rd place, bronze medalist(s)	Matthew Dalton	M36	Great Britain	16.72

==== M40 110 metres hurdles ====
Wind: +0.1

Pos	Athlete	Age	Country	Result
1st place, gold medalist(s)	Yoshioka Yasunori	M41	Japan	14.46
2nd place, silver medalist(s)	Geoffrey Gibbons	M40	Australia	15.29
3rd place, bronze medalist(s)	Brad Krawczyk	M41	Australia	15.76

==== M45 110 metres hurdles ====
Wind: +0.9

Pos	Athlete	Age	Country	Result
1st place, gold medalist(s)	Herbert Simoes	M46	Brazil	15.24
2nd place, silver medalist(s)	Peter Zillig	M46	Switzerland	16.46
3rd place, bronze medalist(s)	Gian Camaschella Luca	M45	Italy	16.81

=== Long hurdles ===
==== M80 200 metres hurdles ====
Wind: +2.3

Pos	Athlete	Age	Country	Result
1st place, gold medalist(s)	Kjartan Sølvberg	M80	Norway	38.84
2nd place, silver medalist(s)	Jostein Haraldseid	M81	Norway	39.93
3rd place, bronze medalist(s)	Tony Bowman	M81	Great Britain	39.96

==== M60 300 metres hurdles ====
Pos	Athlete	Age	Country	Result
1st place, gold medalist(s)	George Haywood	M64	United States	45.92
2nd place, silver medalist(s)	Garry Ralston	M61	Australia	48.51
3rd place, bronze medalist(s)	David McConnell	M64	Australia	48.74

==== M65 300 metres hurdles ====
Pos	Athlete	Age	Country	Result
1st place, gold medalist(s)	John Lamb	M67	Australia	48.33
2nd place, silver medalist(s)	Jürgen Hacker	M68	Germany	49.53
3rd place, bronze medalist(s)	Neil Fowler	M65	Australia	49.95

==== M70 300 metres hurdles ====
Pos	Athlete	Age	Country	Result
1st place, gold medalist(s)	Jelle der van Schaaf	M72	Netherlands	50.86
2nd place, silver medalist(s)	Yuan-Chung Hsu	M74	Chinese Taipei	50.86
3rd place, bronze medalist(s)	Klaus Wucherer	M72	Germany	51.59

==== M75 300 metres hurdles ====
Pos	Athlete	Age	Country	Result
1st place, gold medalist(s)	Takehiro Yasui	M75	Japan	54.54
2nd place, silver medalist(s)	Michael Stevenson	M76	Australia	56.14
3rd place, bronze medalist(s)	Zhixiao Sun	M76	China	57.80

==== M35 400 metres hurdles ====
Pos	Athlete	Age	Country	Result
1st place, gold medalist(s)	Kazuyuki Hirata	M36	Japan	55.24
2nd place, silver medalist(s)	Richard Ingram Reeves	M35	South Africa	56.32
3rd place, bronze medalist(s)	Arachchig Ranasinghe Ku	M38	Australia	58.05

==== M40 400 metres hurdles ====
Pos	Athlete	Age	Country	Result
1st place, gold medalist(s)	Cameron Yorke	M40	Australia	56.62
2nd place, silver medalist(s)	Pei-Jung Huang	M42	Chinese Taipei	57.71
3rd place, bronze medalist(s)	Iván González	M44	Chile	58.63

==== M45 400 metres hurdles ====
Pos	Athlete	Age	Country	Result
1st place, gold medalist(s)	Karnell Vickers	M49	United States	57.50
2nd place, silver medalist(s)	Mattias Sunneborn	M46	Sweden	57.59
3rd place, bronze medalist(s)	Garcia Ramirez Donato	M47	Spain	59.21

==== M50 400 metres hurdles ====
Pos	Athlete	Age	Country	Result
1st place, gold medalist(s)	Frederic Peroni	M53	Italy	1:00.60
2nd place, silver medalist(s)	Roberto Amerio	M51	Italy	1:02.94
3rd place, bronze medalist(s)	Thierry Zapha	M52	France	1:03.38

==== M55 400 metres hurdles ====
Pos	Athlete	Age	Country	Result
1st place, gold medalist(s)	Todd Devery	M56	Australia	1:03.19
2nd place, silver medalist(s)	Richard White	M56	Great Britain	1:04.83
3rd place, bronze medalist(s)	Reggie Garner	M56	United States	1:06.26

=== Steeplechase ===
==== M60 2000 metres steeplechase ====
Pos	Athlete	Age	Country	Result
1st place, gold medalist(s)	Terry Pearce	M61	Australia	7:23.53
2nd place, silver medalist(s)	Oleksandr Lysenko	M61	Ukraine	7:34.29
3rd place, bronze medalist(s)	Sono Masao	M62	Japan	7:36.11

==== M65 2000 metres steeplechase ====
Pos	Athlete	Age	Country	Result
1st place, gold medalist(s)	Allan Mayfield	M67	Australia	7:53.16
2nd place, silver medalist(s)	Giovanni Puglisi	M65	Australia	8:01.25
3rd place, bronze medalist(s)	Anatolii Pavlishyn	M66	Ukraine	8:07.25

==== M70 2000 metres steeplechase ====
Pos	Athlete	Age	Country	Result
1st place, gold medalist(s)	Domingos Moreira	M70	Portugal	8:39.55
2nd place, silver medalist(s)	Michael Bond	M73	New Zealand	9:04.45
3rd place, bronze medalist(s)	Bruce Wilson	M71	Australia	9:23.80

==== M75 2000 metres steeplechase ====
Pos	Athlete	Age	Country	Result
1st place, gold medalist(s)	Jean-Louis Esnault	M76	France	8:50.65R
2nd place, silver medalist(s)	Peter Sandery	M75	Australia	9:37.81
3rd place, bronze medalist(s)	Vern Christensen	M75	Canada	10:10.84

==== M80 2000 metres steeplechase ====
Pos	Athlete	Age	Country	Result
1st place, gold medalist(s)	Ryosuke Takahara	M81	Japan	10:54.00
2nd place, silver medalist(s)	Max Brook	M80	Australia	12:55.97
3rd place, bronze medalist(s)	Colin Silcock-Delaney	M84	Australia	15:18.18

==== M85 2000 metres steeplechase ====
Pos	Athlete	Age	Country	Result
1st place, gold medalist(s)	Irwin Barrett-Lennard	M87	Australia	13:35.53
2nd place, silver medalist(s)	Cecil Walkley	M87	Australia	25:55.47

==== M35 3000 metres steeplechase ====
Pos	Athlete	Age	Country	Result
1st place, gold medalist(s)	Luigi Del Buono	M37	Italy	9:35.27
2nd place, silver medalist(s)	Istvan Jacso	M37	Hungary	10:12.03
3rd place, bronze medalist(s)	Robert Nichols	M39	Australia	10:21.84

==== M40 3000 metres steeplechase ====
Pos	Athlete	Age	Country	Result
1st place, gold medalist(s)	Jacques Sallberg	M42	United States	9:42.36
2nd place, silver medalist(s)	Teppo Syrjala	M41	Finland	9:47.02
3rd place, bronze medalist(s)	Shane Thiele	M40	Australia	10:04.37

==== M45 3000 metres steeplechase ====
Pos	Athlete	Age	Country	Result
1st place, gold medalist(s)	Albert Casals	M46	Spain	10:42.75
2nd place, silver medalist(s)	Moagi Moeketsi	M47	South Africa	10:52.67
3rd place, bronze medalist(s)	Philip Noden	M46	Australia	11:00.63

==== M50 3000 metres steeplechase ====
Pos	Athlete	Age	Country	Result
1st place, gold medalist(s)	Gilles Pelletier	M53	France	10:18.47
2nd place, silver medalist(s)	Milan Serafin	M51	Czech Republic	10:56.24
3rd place, bronze medalist(s)	Bashir Hussain	M51	Great Britain	11:04.94

==== M55 3000 metres steeplechase ====
Pos	Athlete	Age	Country	Result
1st place, gold medalist(s)	Stanislaw Lancucki	M58	Poland	11:10.14
2nd place, silver medalist(s)	Gianfranco Belluomo	M56	Italy	11:17.27
3rd place, bronze medalist(s)	Thierry Huberland	M55	Belgium	11:30.09

=== 4x100 metres relay ===
==== M35 4x100 metres relay ====
Pos	Country	Members/Age	Result
1st place, gold medalist(s)	Great Britain	1) Stewart Marshall 35 2) Richard Beardsell 37; 3) Lawrence Baird 38 4) Ossai Tamunonengiye-Ofori 41	42.32
2nd place, silver medalist(s)	United States	1) Keith Chambers 38 2) Antwon Dussett 41; 3) Mark Gomes 45 4) Sean Burnett 35	43.42
3rd place, bronze medalist(s)	South Africa	1) Robin Buck 41 2) Richard Reeves Ingram 35; 3) Mbhamali Bonginkosi 36 4) Wayne Holroyd 40	44.23

==== M40 4x100 metres relay ====
Pos	Country	Members/Age	Result
1st place, gold medalist(s)	Australia	1) Brett Maurer 40 2) Leigh Phelan 40; 3) Graham Scully 42 4) Daniel Stolp 43	43.89
2nd place, silver medalist(s)	Great Britain	1) Keith Newton 47 2) Ed White 42; 3) Matthew Muggeridge 40 4) Brian Darby 44	46.37
3rd place, bronze medalist(s)	Italy	1) Paolo Bertaccini 51 2) Nicola De Marni 43; 3) Massimiliano Raglianti 42 4) Filippo Bianchi 43	50.64

==== M45 4x100 metres relay ====
Pos	Country	Members/Age	Result
1st place, gold medalist(s)	Germany	1) Thomas Keßler 46 2) Bernd Schauwecker 47; 3) Bernd Lachmann 47 4) David Alexander 46	44.69
2nd place, silver medalist(s)	United States	1) John Cormier 49 2) Karnell Vickers 49; 3) Gavin Thorne 45 4) Derek Pye 48	44.97
3rd place, bronze medalist(s)	Australia	1) Michael Berlin 47 2) Andrew Wilcox 47; 3) Ken Telfer 49 4) Robert Colling 45	45.82

==== M50 4x100 metres relay ====
Pos	Country	Members/Age	Result
1st place, gold medalist(s)	United States	1) Don McGee 56 2) Robert Thomas 50; 3)) William Yelverton 56 4) Aurelien Clinton 50	45.15
2nd place, silver medalist(s)	Germany	1) Meinert Möller 50 2) Roland Groeger 52; 3) Lars Klingenberg 50 4) Contag Andreas 56	45.80
3rd place, bronze medalist(s)	Australia	1) Colin Smith 53 2) Bernard Riviere 50; 3) Stephen Jones 53 4) Darren Hughes 53	47.39

==== M55 4x100 metres relay ====
Pos	Country	Members/Age	Result
1st place, gold medalist(s)	Australia	1) Gregory O'Keeffe 57 2) John Hilditch 55; 3) Trevor Young 58 4) Rudy Kocis 55	48.08
2nd place, silver medalist(s)	Great Britain	1) Paul Guest 55 2) Michael Vassiliou 55; 3) Peter Ilo 55 4) Jeff Battista 57	48.28
3rd place, bronze medalist(s)	United States	1) Reggie Garner 56 2) Eugene Anton 58; 3) Michael Radiff 64 4) Jeff Brower 57	53.45

==== M60 4x100 metres relay ====
Pos	Country	Members/Age	Result
1st place, gold medalist(s)	Japan	1) Shiro Watanabe 61 2) Tetsushi Niida 64; 3) Kazuo Ishida 63 4) Ryoichi Oe 62	49.11
2nd place, silver medalist(s)	Germany	1) Rudolf König 62 2) Gerhard Zorn 60; 3) Reinhard Michelchen 62 4) Ernst Becker 61	49.34
3rd place, bronze medalist(s)	United States	1) Kevin Marbury 60 2) Michael Radiff 64; 3) George Haywood 64 4) Bill Collins 65	50.38

==== M65 4x100 metres relay ====
Pos	Country	Members/Age	Result
1st place, gold medalist(s)	Australia	1) Alan Coleman 67 2) Peter Lamb 67; 3) Graham Ford 67 4) John Lamb 67	53.41
2nd place, silver medalist(s)	Germany	1) Klemm Ulrich 67 2) Karl Dorschner 65; 3) Udo Lippoldes 69 4) Thomas Partzsch 69	53.93
3rd place, bronze medalist(s)	New Zealand	1) Trevor Guptill 70 2) Ian Carter 65; 3) Anthony Deleiros 69 4) Alan Dougall 68	55.75

==== M70 4x100 metres relay ====
Pos	Country	Members/Age	Result
1st place, gold medalist(s)	Australia	1) John Wall 70 2) John Wight 70; 3) Neville McIntyre 73 4) Peter Crombie 71	53.67
2nd place, silver medalist(s)	Germany	1) Christian Fitza 70 2) Roland Wolf 70; 3) Adorf Friedhelm 73 4) Klaus Wucherer 72	56.07
3rd place, bronze medalist(s)	China	1) Ming Ding 72 2) Zhixiao Sun 76; 3) Enyu Li 73 4) Wen Kui Wang 70	1:00.31

==== M75 4x100 metres relay ====
Pos	Country	Members/Age	Result
1st place, gold medalist(s)	Australia	1) Graeme Noden 78 2) Michael Stevenson 76; 3) Pio Bunin 75 4) Barrie Kernaghan 76	59.95
2nd place, silver medalist(s)	Germany	1) Hermann Beckering 77 2) Horst Hufnagel 81; 3) Karl Schmid 78 4) Knorr Hartmann 76	1:01.02
3rd place, bronze medalist(s)	India	1) Ambzhthingal Abdussamed 75 2) Joseph Jacob Muttappillil 75; 3) Kunjunair Subramanian 78 4) Muthusamy Andivelu Subbiah 75	1:05.72

==== M80 4x100 metres relay ====
Pos	Country	Members/Age	Result
1st place, gold medalist(s)	Japan	1) Ueda Yutaka 81 2) Ryosuke Takahara 81; 3) Munehiro Toriya 87 4) Hiroo Tanaka 85	1:17.41

==== M85 4x100 metres relay ====
Pos	Country	Members/Age	Result
1st place, gold medalist(s)	Australia	1) Jack Thackray 85 2) Derry Foley 87; 3) James Sinclair 92 4) Leo Coffey 86	1:23.82
2nd place, silver medalist(s)	China	1) Jinbiao Wang 85 2) Guiben Sun 87; 3) Zhiyong Wang 92 4) Pengxue Su 89	1:41.04

=== 4x400 metres relay ===
==== M35 4x400 metres relay ====
Pos	Country	Members/Age	Result
1st place, gold medalist(s)	Great Britain	1) Stewart Marshall 35 2) Lawrence Baird 38; 3) Ossai Tamunonengiye-Ofori 41 4) Richard Beardsell	3:21.07
2nd place, silver medalist(s)	United States	1) Sean Burnett 35 2) Antwon Dussett 41; 3) Jason Rhodes 44 4) Keith Chambers 38	3:25.82
3rd place, bronze medalist(s)	Spain	1) Donato Garcia Ramirez 47 2) Octavio Pérez Calatayud 38; 3) Abdeslam Khattabi Louah 35 4) José Luis Alavés Clemente 35	3:27.49

==== M40 4x400 metres relay ====
Pos	Country	Members/Age	Result
1st place, gold medalist(s)	Australia	1) Geoffrey Pittman 43 2) Cameron Yorke 40; 3) Brett Maurer 40 4) Daniel Stolp 43	3:31.30
2nd place, silver medalist(s)	Great Britain	1) Matthew Muggeridge 40 2) Ed White 42; 3) David Shortridge 46 4) Brian Darby 44	3:42.64
3rd place, bronze medalist(s)	Czech Republic	1) Zdenek Pech 49 2) Jiri Burda 49; 3) Khyr Bronislav 41 4) Martin Knapp 40	3:45.63

==== M45 4x400 metres relay ====
Pos	Country	Members/Age	Result
1st place, gold medalist(s)	Germany	1) David Alexander 46 2) Bernd Lachmann 47; 3) Joerg Ritter 47 4) Bernd Schauwecker 47	3:36.32
2nd place, silver medalist(s)	Canada	1) Serge Faucher 52 2) Marcus Skeete 49; 3) Paul Osland 52 4) Lawrence Williams 45	3:36.70
3rd place, bronze medalist(s)	Australia	1) Christopher Neale 47 2) David Page 45; 3) Craig Sanford 48 4) Andrew Wilcox 47	3:36.73

==== M50 4x400 metres relay ====
Pos	Country	Members/Age	Result
1st place, gold medalist(s)	United States	1) Clinton Aurelien 50 2) Summay Landen 51; 3)) Terry Parks 52 4) Robert Thomas 50	3:39.31
2nd place, silver medalist(s)	Germany	1) Meinert Möller 50 2) Jürgen Hallmaier 54; 3) Burghardt Funk 53 4) Roland Groeger 52	3:41.04
3rd place, bronze medalist(s)	Australia	1) Darren Hughes 53 2) Matthew Lynch 50; 3) Rob Italia 50 4) Colin Smith 53	3:46.74

==== M55 4x400 metres relay ====
Pos	Country	Members/Age	Result
1st place, gold medalist(s)	Australia	1) Todd Devery 56 2) Gregory O'Keeffe 57; 3) Rob Mayston 59 4) Trevor Young 58	3:49.03
2nd place, silver medalist(s)	Great Britain	1) Peter Ilo 55 2) Ludwig Ramsey 57; 3) Michael Vassiliou 55 4) Richard White 56	3:49.17
3rd place, bronze medalist(s)	United States	1) Reggie Garner 56 2) George Haywood 64; 3) Kevin Marbury 60 4) William Yelverton 56	4:09.64

==== M60 4x400 metres relay ====
Pos	Country	Members/Age	Result
1st place, gold medalist(s)	Germany	1) Michelchen Reinhard 62 2) Karl Dorschner 65; 3) Rudolf König 62 4) Gerhard Zorn 60	3:53.70
2nd place, silver medalist(s)	Australia	1) Andrew Watts 61 2) Michael Barrand 64; 3) David McConnell 64 4) Richard Parker 60	4:11.97
3rd place, bronze medalist(s)	Great Britain	1) Terry Hall 63 2) Webster Graham 64; 3) Bob Douglas 63 4) Franklyn Walwyn 64	4:35.09

==== M65 4x400 metres relay ====
Pos	Country	Members/Age	Result
1st place, gold medalist(s)	Australia	1) Michael Byrne 65 2) Peter Lamb 67; 3) Alan Coleman 67 4) John Lamb 67	4:18.68
2nd place, silver medalist(s)	Great Britain	1) Ian Snow 66 2) Peter Duhig 66; 3) David Oxland 65 4) Bruce Hendrie 68	4:43.68
3rd place, bronze medalist(s)	Germany	1) Klemm Ulrich 67 2) Jürgen Hacker 68; 3) Christian Fitza 70 4) Partzsch Thomas 69	5:03.45

==== M70 4x400 metres relay ====
Pos	Country	Members/Age	Result
1st place, gold medalist(s)	Australia	1) Keith Howden 71 2) Donald Mathewson 72; 3) Neville McIntyre 73 4) Peter Crombie 71	4:35.75
2nd place, silver medalist(s)	Germany	1) Adorf Friedhelm 73 2) Roland Wolf 70; 3) Alfred Hermes 70 4) Klaus Wucherer 72	4:45.60
3rd place, bronze medalist(s)	Japan	1) Hideo Mitsugi 70 2) Yasuro Narumi 71; 3) Chuji Ogawa 70 4) Takehiro Yasui 75	4:57.42

==== M75 4x400 metres relay ====
Pos	Country	Members/Age	Result
1st place, gold medalist(s)	Australia	1) Michael O'Reilly 77 2) Pio Bunin 75; 3) Michael Stevenson 76 4) Barrie Kernaghan 76	5:12.41
2nd place, silver medalist(s)	Germany	1) Gerhard Klauder 79 2) Horst Hufnagel 81; 3) Knorr Hartmann 76 4) Hermann Beckering 77	5:29.59
3rd place, bronze medalist(s)	India	1) Abdussamed Ambzhthingal 75 2) Jacob Muttappillil Joseph 75; 3) Kunjunair Subramanian 78 4) Subbiah Muthusamy Andivelu 75	6:26.62

==== M85 4x400 metres relay ====
Pos	Country	Members/Age	Result
1st place, gold medalist(s)	China	1) Jinbiao Wang 85 2) Guiben Sun 87; 3) Zhiyong Wang 92 4) Pengxue Su 89	8:35.23

=== High Jump ===
==== M35 High Jump ====
Pos	Athlete	Age	Country	Result
1st place, gold medalist(s)	Laurent Jobard	M37	France	1.99 m (6 ft 6 1/4 in)
2nd place, silver medalist(s)	Richard White	M35	United States	1.96 m (6 ft 5 in)
3rd place, bronze medalist(s)	Krzysztof Ratajczyk	M38	Poland	1.80 m (5 ft 10 3/4 in)

==== M40 High Jump ====
Pos	Athlete	Age	Country	Result
1st place, gold medalist(s)	Fukumoto Yoshihisa	M43	Japan	2.02 m (6 ft 7 1/2 in)
2nd place, silver medalist(s)	Nick Moroney	M44	Australia	1.96 m (6 ft 5 in)
3rd place, bronze medalist(s)	Markus Paquée	M41	Germany	1.75 m (5 ft 8 3/4 in)

==== M45 High Jump ====
Pos	Athlete	Age	Country	Result
1st place, gold medalist(s)	Ken Amano	M45	Japan	1.77 m (5 ft 9 1/2 in)
2nd place, silver medalist(s)	Chris Anderson	M48	Australia	1.71 m (5 ft 7 1/4 in)
3rd place, bronze medalist(s)	Ralph ONeal	M49	United States	1.65 m (5 ft 4 3/4 in)

==== M50 High Jump ====
Pos	Athlete	Age	Country	Result
1st place, gold medalist(s)	Georgios Farmakis	M51	Greece	1.84 m (6 ft 1/4 in)
2nd place, silver medalist(s)	Granillo Díaz Angel Est	M54	United States	1.70 m (5 ft 6 3/4 in)
3rd place, bronze medalist(s)	Terry Parks	M52	United States	1.70 m (5 ft 6 3/4 in)

==== M55 High Jump ====
Pos	Athlete	Age	Country	Result
1st place, gold medalist(s)	Volodymyr Shelever	M55	Australia	1.71 m (5 ft 7 1/4 in)
2nd place, silver medalist(s)	Neal Bredeveldt	M55	South Africa	1.68 m (5 ft 6 in)
3rd place, bronze medalist(s)	Thomas Foley	M58	United States	1.68 m (5 ft 6 in)

==== M60 High Jump ====
Pos	Athlete	Age	Country	Result
1st place, gold medalist(s)	Dariusz Bednarski	M62	Poland	1.62 m (5 ft 3 3/4 in)
2nd place, silver medalist(s)	Volkmar Herrmann	M61	Germany	1.56 m (5 ft 1 1/4 in)
3rd place, bronze medalist(s)	Peter Pach	M64	Germany	1.50 m (4 ft 11 in)

==== M65 High Jump ====
Pos	Athlete	Age	Country	Result
1st place, gold medalist(s)	Ulf Tudem	M65	Norway	1.59 m (5 ft 2 1/2 in)
2nd place, silver medalist(s)	Bengt Myrberg	M65	Sweden	1.56 m (5 ft 1 1/4 in)
3rd place, bronze medalist(s)	Valdis Cela	M68	Latvia	1.50 m (4 ft 11 in)

==== M70 High Jump ====
Pos	Athlete	Age	Country	Result
1st place, gold medalist(s)	David Montieth	M71	United States	1.48 m (4 ft 10 1/4 in)
2nd place, silver medalist(s)	Pertti Ahomaki	M70	Finland	1.48 m (4 ft 10 1/4 in)
3rd place, bronze medalist(s)	Frantisek Vykydal	M72	Czech Republic	1.36 m (4 ft 5 1/2 in)

==== M75 High Jump ====
Pos	Athlete	Age	Country	Result
1st place, gold medalist(s)	Hans Miekautsch	M78	Austria	1.27 m (4 ft 2 in)
2nd place, silver medalist(s)	Kyösti Poutiainen	M75	Finland	1.24 m (4 ft 3/4 in)
3rd place, bronze medalist(s)	Brian Waldhuter	M76	Australia	1.20 m (3 ft 11 in)

==== M80 High Jump ====
Pos	Athlete	Age	Country	Result
1st place, gold medalist(s)	Kvetoslav Vykydal	M80	Czech Republic	1.24 m (4 ft 3/4 in)
2nd place, silver medalist(s)	Thomas Hancock	M80	Australia	1.22 m (4 ft 0 in)
3rd place, bronze medalist(s)	Marko Sluga	M81	Slovenia	1.20 m (3 ft 11 in)

==== M85 High Jump ====
Pos	Athlete	Age	Country	Result
1st place, gold medalist(s)	Ake Lund	M86	Finland	1.06 m (3 ft 5 1/2 in)
2nd place, silver medalist(s)	Munehiro Toriya	M87	Japan	0.98 m (3 ft 2 1/2 in)
3rd place, bronze medalist(s)	Pengxue Su	M89	China	0.92 m (3 ft 0 in)

=== Pole Vault ===
==== M35 Pole Vault ====
Pos	Athlete	Age	Country	Result
1st place, gold medalist(s)	Eric Reuillard	M36	France	4.70 m (15 ft 5 in)
2nd place, silver medalist(s)	Alessandro Cambon	M37	Italy	4.20 m (13 ft 9 1/4 in)
3rd place, bronze medalist(s)	Cameron Sherry	M35	Australia	3.80 m (12 ft 5 1/2 in)

==== M40 Pole Vault ====
Pos	Athlete	Age	Country	Result
1st place, gold medalist(s)	Leon D'Onofrio	M41	Australia	4.40 m (14 ft 5 in)

==== M45 Pole Vault ====
Pos	Athlete	Age	Country	Result
1st place, gold medalist(s)	Pochetov Yegorov Grigor	M49	Spain	4.30 m (14 ft 1 1/4 in)
2nd place, silver medalist(s)	Howard Arbuthnot	M49	Australia	4.30 m (14 ft 1 1/4 in)
3rd place, bronze medalist(s)	Rob Hill	M46	Australia	4.20 m (13 ft 9 1/4 in)

==== M50 Pole Vault ====
Pos	Athlete	Age	Country	Result
1st place, gold medalist(s)	Volkmar Reinecke	M50	Germany	4.05 m (13 ft 3 1/4 in)
2nd place, silver medalist(s)	Jozef Vasina	M50	Slovakia	3.80 m (12 ft 5 1/2 in)
2nd place, silver medalist(s)	Glyn Price	M51	Great Britain	3.80 m (12 ft 5 1/2 in)

==== M55 Pole Vault ====
Pos	Athlete	Age	Country	Result
1st place, gold medalist(s)	Steven Campbell	M55	United States	3.81 m (12 ft 6 in)
2nd place, silver medalist(s)	Miroslav Bajner	M59	Slovakia	3.55 m (11 ft 7 3/4 in)
3rd place, bronze medalist(s)	Bunyat Rungrueng	M55	Thailand	3.45 m (11 ft 3 3/4 in)

==== M60 Pole Vault ====
Pos	Athlete	Age	Country	Result
1st place, gold medalist(s)	Allan Williams	M63	Great Britain	3.30 m (10 ft 9 3/4 in)
2nd place, silver medalist(s)	Klaus-Peter Neuendorf	M62	Germany	3.20 m (10 ft 5 3/4 in)
3rd place, bronze medalist(s)	Jón Ólafsson Sigurður	M62	Iceland	3.20 m (10 ft 5 3/4 in)

==== M65 Pole Vault ====
Pos	Athlete	Age	Country	Result
1st place, gold medalist(s)	Valdis Cela	M68	Latvia	3.10 m (10 ft 2 in)
2nd place, silver medalist(s)	Geoff Shaw	M68	Australia	2.95 m (9 ft 8 in)
3rd place, bronze medalist(s)	SeppoSaarela; Björn Bratt	M67; M65	Finland; Sweden	2.90 m (9 ft 6 in)

==== M70 Pole Vault ====
Pos	Athlete	Age	Country	Result
1st place, gold medalist(s)	George Schillinger	M70	Australia	2.80 m (9 ft 2 in)
2nd place, silver medalist(s)	Veikko Makela	M71	Finland	2.70 m (8 ft 10 1/4 in)
3rd place, bronze medalist(s)	Leona Saravia Salvarrey	M72	Uruguay	2.40 m (7 ft 10 1/4 in)

==== M75 Pole Vault ====
Pos	Athlete	Age	Country	Result
1st place, gold medalist(s)	Hans Lagerqvist	M76	Sweden	2.83 m (9 ft 3 1/4 in)
2nd place, silver medalist(s)	Kyösti Poutiainen	M75	Finland	2.50 m (8 ft 2 1/4 in)
3rd place, bronze medalist(s)	Gerhard Lickfett	M79	Germany	2.50 m (8 ft 2 1/4 in)

==== M80 Pole Vault ====
Pos	Athlete	Age	Country	Result
1st place, gold medalist(s)	Kjartan Sølvberg	M80	Norway	2.25 m (7 ft 4 1/2 in)
2nd place, silver medalist(s)	Kvetoslav Vykydal	M80	Czech Republic	1.80 m (5 ft 10 3/4 in)
3rd place, bronze medalist(s)	Brian Greaves	M81	Australia	1.70 m (5 ft 6 3/4 in)

==== M85 Pole Vault ====
Pos	Athlete	Age	Country	Result
1st place, gold medalist(s)	Ake Lund	M86	Finland	1.80 m (5 ft 10 3/4 in)
2nd place, silver medalist(s)	Munehiro Toriya	M87	Japan	1.70 m (5 ft 6 3/4 in)
3rd place, bronze medalist(s)	Jerry Donley	M86	United States	1.60 m (5 ft 2 3/4 in)

=== Long Jump ===
==== M35 Long Jump ====
Pos	Athlete	Age	Country	Result Wind
1st place, gold medalist(s)	Adrian Olszewski	M38	Poland	6.93 m (22 ft 8 3/4 in) +2.0
2nd place, silver medalist(s)	Michael Sullivan	M35	United States	6.85 m (22 ft 5 1/2 in)w +4.6
3rd place, bronze medalist(s)	Navid Childs	M35	Great Britain	6.67 m (21 ft 10 1/2 in)w +2.6

==== M40 Long Jump ====
Pos	Athlete	Age	Country	Result Wind
1st place, gold medalist(s)	Bakri Daroueche	M42	France	7.09 m (23 ft 3 in)w +3.8
2nd place, silver medalist(s)	Brad Krawczyk	M41	Australia	6.62 m (21 ft 8 1/2 in)w +4.0
3rd place, bronze medalist(s)	Robin Buck	M41	South Africa	6.51 m (21 ft 4 1/4 in)w +2.0

==== M45 Long Jump ====
Pos	Athlete	Age	Country	Result Wind
1st place, gold medalist(s)	Mattias Sunneborn	M46	Sweden	6.48 m (21 ft 3 in)w +2.2
2nd place, silver medalist(s)	Stefano Tari	M45	Italy	6.46 m (21 ft 2 1/4 in)w +4.3
3rd place, bronze medalist(s)	Jason Robinson	M46	Canada	6.17 m (20 ft 2 3/4 in)w +2.7

==== M50 Long Jump ====
Pos	Athlete	Age	Country	Result Wind
1st place, gold medalist(s)	Philippe Poulain	M50	Belgium	6.16 m (20 ft 2 1/2 in)w +2.7
2nd place, silver medalist(s)	Andre Briscan	M51	France	6.07 m (19 ft 10 3/4 in)w +2.7
3rd place, bronze medalist(s)	Ian Allen	M50	Great Britainw	5.71 m (18 ft 8 3/4 in) +4.2

==== M55 Long Jump ====
Pos	Athlete	Age	Country	Result Wind
1st place, gold medalist(s)	Wai Kung Ling	M56	Hong Kong	6.06 m (19 ft 10 1/2 in)w +2.3
2nd place, silver medalist(s)	Paul Guest	M55	Great Britain	5.87 m (19 ft 3 in) +0.9
3rd place, bronze medalist(s)	Tetsushi Yamashita	M55	Japan	5.73 m (18 ft 9 1/2 in)w +4.8

==== M60 Long Jump ====
Pos	Athlete	Age	Country	Result Wind
1st place, gold medalist(s)	Anders Olsson	M60	Sweden	5.60 m (18 ft 4 1/4 in) +0.2
2nd place, silver medalist(s)	Garry Ralston	M61	Australia	5.23 m (17 ft 1 3/4 in) -1.4
3rd place, bronze medalist(s)	Ari Aartola	M64	Finland	5.12 m (16 ft 9 1/2 in) +0.7

==== M65 Long Jump ====
Pos	Athlete	Age	Country	Result Wind
1st place, gold medalist(s)	Hiroji Namiki	M67	Japan	5.07 m (16 ft 7 1/2 in) +0.7
2nd place, silver medalist(s)	Sylwester Lorenz	M65	Poland	4.87 m (15 ft 11 1/2 in) 0.0
3rd place, bronze medalist(s)	Sture Holmberg	M65	Sweden	4.74 m (15 ft 6 1/2 in) +1.5

==== M70 Long Jump ====
Pos	Athlete	Age	Country	Result Wind
1st place, gold medalist(s)	Pertti Ahomaki	M70	Finland	4.87 m (15 ft 11 1/2 in)w +2.4
2nd place, silver medalist(s)	Jürgen Lamp	M72	Estonia	4.56 m (14 ft 11 1/2 in)w +2.6
3rd place, bronze medalist(s)	Roy White	M70	Great Britain	4.32 m (14 ft 2 in)w +4.3

==== M75 Long Jump ====
Pos	Athlete	Age	Country	Result Wind
1st place, gold medalist(s)	Takehiro Yasui	M75	Japan	4.32 m (14 ft 2 in) -0.1
2nd place, silver medalist(s)	Zhixiao Sun	M76	China	4.14 m (13 ft 6 3/4 in) 0.0
3rd place, bronze medalist(s)	Hiromu Shimizu	M75	Brazil	3.99 m (13 ft 1 in) +1.7

==== M80 Long Jump ====
Pos	Athlete	Age	Country	Result Wind
1st place, gold medalist(s)	Brian Greaves	M81	Australia	3.25 m (10 ft 7 3/4 in)w +5.6
2nd place, silver medalist(s)	Ernest Caffrey	M80	Ireland	2.99 m (9 ft 9 1/2 in)w +3.5
3rd place, bronze medalist(s)	Charles Crowley	M83	Australia	2.97 m (9 ft 8 3/4 in)w +2.1

==== M85 Long Jump ====
Pos	Athlete	Age	Country	Result Wind
1st place, gold medalist(s)	Ake Lund	M86	Finland	2.91 m (9 ft 6 1/2 in)w +3.9
2nd place, silver medalist(s)	Mario Calderon Cesar	M85	Guatemala	2.77 m (9 ft 1 in)w +3.4
3rd place, bronze medalist(s)	Pengxue Su	M89	China	2.32 m (7 ft 7 1/4 in)w +3.6

==== M90 Long Jump ====
Pos	Athlete	Age	Country	Result Wind
1st place, gold medalist(s)	Maurice Dauphinet	M90	Australia	2.19 m (7 ft 2 in)w +2.4

=== Triple Jump ===
==== M35 Triple Jump ====
Pos	Athlete	Age	Country	Result Wind
1st place, gold medalist(s)	Lawrence Harvey	M35	Great Britain	15.09 m (49 ft 6 in)w +3.4
2nd place, silver medalist(s)	Navid Childs	M35	Great Britain	14.21 m (46 ft 7 1/4 in)w +2.3
3rd place, bronze medalist(s)	Adrian Olszewski	M38	Poland	13.90 m (45 ft 7 in)w +2.0

==== M40 Triple Jump ====
Pos	Athlete	Age	Country	Result Wind
1st place, gold medalist(s)	Mika Ahomaki	M44	Finland	12.62 m (41 ft 4 3/4 in) 0.0
2nd place, silver medalist(s)	Jason Melton	M40	United States	12.36 m (40 ft 6 1/2 in) 0.0
3rd place, bronze medalist(s)	David Kellett	M43	Australia	12.15 m (39 ft 10 1/4 in) 0.0

==== M45 Triple Jump ====
Pos	Athlete	Age	Country	Result Wind
1st place, gold medalist(s)	Mattias Sunneborn	M46	Sweden	14.23 m (46 ft 8 in)w +3.6
2nd place, silver medalist(s)	Hugues Valence	M45	France	14.00 m (45 ft 11 in)w +3.7
3rd place, bronze medalist(s)	Keith Newton	M47	Great Britainw	12.55 m (41 ft 2 in) +2.2

==== M50 Triple Jump ====
Pos	Athlete	Age	Country	Result Wind
1st place, gold medalist(s)	Andre Briscan	M51	France	13.51 m (44 ft 3 3/4 in)w +2.2
2nd place, silver medalist(s)	Nick Hodgson	M52	Australia	12.99 m (42 ft 7 1/4 in)w +3.1
3rd place, bronze medalist(s)	Martin Baranzke	M53	Germany	11.27 m (36 ft 11 1/2 in) +1.7

==== M55 Triple Jump ====
Pos	Athlete	Age	Country	Result Wind
1st place, gold medalist(s)	Jose Quinaliza	M55	Ecuador	12.85 m (42 ft 1 3/4 in)w +3.3
2nd place, silver medalist(s)	David Dixon	M56	Great Britain	11.86 m (38 ft 10 3/4 in)w +3.4
3rd place, bronze medalist(s)	Valeri Fedjushin	M56	Estonia	11.71 m (38 ft 5 in)w +3.2

==== M60 Triple Jump ====
Pos	Athlete	Age	Country	Result Wind
1st place, gold medalist(s)	Hasan Kasap	M60	Turkey	11.04 m (36 ft 2 1/2 in)w +4.5
2nd place, silver medalist(s)	Wolfram Walther	M61	Germany	10.95 m (35 ft 11 in)w +2.9
3rd place, bronze medalist(s)	Ari Aartola	M64	Finland	10.90 m (35 ft 9 in) +1.5

==== M65 Triple Jump ====
Pos	Athlete	Age	Country	Result Wind
1st place, gold medalist(s)	István Korösi	M66	Hungary	10.93 m (35 ft 10 1/4 in)w +3.9
2nd place, silver medalist(s)	Paul Henry	M65	Belgium	10.41 m (34 ft 1 3/4 in)w +3.4
3rd place, bronze medalist(s)	Yutaka Harama	M66	Japan	10.29 m (33 ft 9 in)w +2.6

==== M70 Triple Jump ====
Pos	Athlete	Age	Country	Result Wind
1st place, gold medalist(s)	Pertti Ahomaki	M70	Finland	10.88 m (35 ft 8 1/4 in)w +3.2
2nd place, silver medalist(s)	Jürgen Lamp	M72	Estonia	10.56 m (34 ft 7 1/2 in)w +4.6
3rd place, bronze medalist(s)	David Anstiss	M71	New Zealand	9.11 m (29 ft 10 1/2 in)w +2.5

==== M75 Triple Jump ====
Pos	Athlete	Age	Country	Result Wind
1st place, gold medalist(s)	Takehiro Yasui	M75	Japan	9.33 m (30 ft 7 1/4 in) +1.6
2nd place, silver medalist(s)	Hiromu Shimizu	M75	Brazil	8.67 m (28 ft 5 1/4 in)w +3.5
3rd place, bronze medalist(s)	Julian Jacotine	M76	Australia	8.48 m (27 ft 9 3/4 in) +1.4

==== M80 Triple Jump ====
Pos	Athlete	Age	Country	Result Wind
1st place, gold medalist(s)	Kvetoslav Vykydal	M80	Czech Republic	7.30 m (23 ft 11 1/4 in)w +4.9
2nd place, silver medalist(s)	Brian Greaves	M81	Australia	7.22 m (23 ft 8 1/4 in)w +2.4
3rd place, bronze medalist(s)	Charles Crowley	M83	Australia	6.17 m (20 ft 2 3/4 in)w +3.7

==== M85 Triple Jump ====
Pos	Athlete	Age	Country	Result
1st place, gold medalist(s)	Mario Calderon Cesar	M85	Guatemala	6.59m 3 21-07.50
2nd place, silver medalist(s)	Leo Coffey	M86	Australia	6.07m 2.2 19-11.00
3rd place, bronze medalist(s)	Ake Lund	M86	Finland	5.82m 4.5 19-01.25

=== Shot Put ===
==== M35 Shot Put ====
Pos	Athlete	Age	Country	Result
1st place, gold medalist(s)	Dominik Lewin	M36	Germany	15.09 m (49 ft 6 in)
2nd place, silver medalist(s)	Jamie Muscat	M39	Australia	14.79 m (48 ft 6 1/4 in)
3rd place, bronze medalist(s)	Darrin Norwood	M37	Australia	14.59 m (47 ft 10 1/4 in)

==== M40 Shot Put ====
Pos	Athlete	Age	Country	Result
1st place, gold medalist(s)	Pakinder Singh	M44	India	14.77 m (48 ft 5 1/4 in)
2nd place, silver medalist(s)	Wayne Willis	M42	Australia	14.77 m (48 ft 5 1/4 in)
3rd place, bronze medalist(s)	Martin Plews	M44	South Africa	12.98 m (42 ft 7 in)

==== M45 Shot Put ====
Pos	Athlete	Age	Country	Result
1st place, gold medalist(s)	Imvraim Fanartzis	M46	Greece	14.08 m (46 ft 2 1/4 in)
2nd place, silver medalist(s)	Jan Heyns	M45	South Africa	13.98 m (45 ft 10 1/4 in)
3rd place, bronze medalist(s)	Pavel Penaz	M47	Czech Republic	13.46 m (44 ft 1 3/4 in)

==== M50 Shot Put ====
Pos	Athlete	Age	Country	Result
1st place, gold medalist(s)	Todd Davey	M50	Australia	14.41 m (47 ft 3 1/4 in)
2nd place, silver medalist(s)	Karsten Schneider	M53	Germany	14.27 m (46 ft 9 3/4 in)
3rd place, bronze medalist(s)	Stephen Liggins	M51	Australia	13.29 m (43 ft 7 in)

==== M55 Shot Put ====
Pos	Athlete	Age	Country	Result
1st place, gold medalist(s)	Burton Haupt	M55	South Africa	15.84 m (51 ft 11 1/2 in)
2nd place, silver medalist(s)	Steve Gettel	M57	United States	14.11 m (46 ft 3 1/2 in)
3rd place, bronze medalist(s)	Joshua Pondo	M56	Kenya	14.03 m (46 ft 1/4 in)

==== M60 Shot Put ====
Pos	Athlete	Age	Country	Result
1st place, gold medalist(s)	Quenton Torbert	M64	United States	15.56 m (51 ft 1/2 in)
2nd place, silver medalist(s)	Miro Prstec	M60	Slovenia	14.35 m (47 ft 3/4 in)
3rd place, bronze medalist(s)	Joseph Myers	M64	United States	14.10 m (46 ft 3 in)

==== M65 Shot Put ====
Pos	Athlete	Age	Country	Result
1st place, gold medalist(s)	Arild Busterud	M68	Norway	14.50 m (47 ft 6 3/4 in)
2nd place, silver medalist(s)	Hansruedi Staeheli	M66	Switzerland	13.91 m (45 ft 7 1/2 in)
3rd place, bronze medalist(s)	Arvo Nurm	M68	Estonia	13.47 m (44 ft 2 1/4 in)

==== M70 Shot Put ====
Pos	Athlete	Age	Country	Result
1st place, gold medalist(s)	William Harvey	M70	United States	13.70 m (44 ft 11 1/4 in)
2nd place, silver medalist(s)	Rein Kaljumäe	M72	Estonia	12.65 m (41 ft 6 in)
3rd place, bronze medalist(s)	Leo Christopher	M74	Australia	12.25 m (40 ft 2 1/4 in)

==== M75 Shot Put ====
Pos	Athlete	Age	Country	Result
1st place, gold medalist(s)	Dick Schrieken	M76	Netherlands	12.84 m (42 ft 1 1/2 in)
2nd place, silver medalist(s)	Czeslaw Roszczak	M75	Poland	12.17 m (39 ft 11 in)
3rd place, bronze medalist(s)	Hiroshi Yamada	M75	Japan	11.20 m (36 ft 8 3/4 in)

==== M80 Shot Put ====
Pos	Athlete	Age	Country	Result
1st place, gold medalist(s)	Kjartan Sølvberg	M80	Norway	11.93 m (39 ft 1 1/2 in)
2nd place, silver medalist(s)	Thomas Hancock	M80	Australia	11.66 m (38 ft 3 in)
3rd place, bronze medalist(s)	Andrzej Rzepecki	M80	South Africa	11.44 m (37 ft 6 1/4 in)

==== M85 Shot Put ====
Pos	Athlete	Age	Country	Result
1st place, gold medalist(s)	Leo Saarinen	M87	Finland	10.04 m (32 ft 11 1/4 in)
2nd place, silver medalist(s)	Arne Sæther	M85	Norway	9.09 m (29 ft 9 3/4 in)
3rd place, bronze medalist(s)	Dave Douglass	M85	United States	7.42 m (24 ft 4 in)

==== M90 Shot Put ====
Pos	Athlete	Age	Country	Result
1st place, gold medalist(s)	Sudarshanam Pakerla	M93	India	6.80 m (22 ft 3 1/2 in)
2nd place, silver medalist(s)	Maurice Dauphinet	M90	Australia	6.51 m (21 ft 4 1/4 in)
3rd place, bronze medalist(s)	Basil Henney	M91	Canada	5.33 m (17 ft 5 3/4 in)

=== Discus Throw ===
==== M35 Discus Throw ====
Pos	Athlete	Age	Country	Result
1st place, gold medalist(s)	Petros Mitsides	M38	Cyprus	53.14 m (174 ft 4 in)
2nd place, silver medalist(s)	Dominik Lewin	M36	Germany	49.80 m (163 ft 4 in)
3rd place, bronze medalist(s)	Pardeep Mathur Kumar	M39	India	44.70 m (146 ft 7 in)

==== M40 Discus Throw ====
Pos	Athlete	Age	Country	Result
1st place, gold medalist(s)	Bjørn Pay Terje	M42	Norway	53.25 m (174 ft 8 in)
2nd place, silver medalist(s)	Mika Loikkanen	M42	Finland	48.25 m (158 ft 3 in)
3rd place, bronze medalist(s)	Pakinder Singh	M44	India	44.37 m (145 ft 6 in)

==== M45 Discus Throw ====
Pos	Athlete	Age	Country	Result
1st place, gold medalist(s)	Pavel Penaz	M47	Czech Republic	47.51 m (155 ft 10 in)
2nd place, silver medalist(s)	Justin Holzer	M45	Australia	42.88 m (140 ft 8 in)
3rd place, bronze medalist(s)	Martin Venter	M46	South Africa	40.76 m (133 ft 8 in)

==== M50 Discus Throw ====
Pos	Athlete	Age	Country	Result
1st place, gold medalist(s)	Martin Harland	M53	Australia	51.77 m (169 ft 10 in)
2nd place, silver medalist(s)	Todd Davey	M50	Australia	50.94 m (167 ft 1 in)
3rd place, bronze medalist(s)	Harri Uurainen	M54	Finland	50.39 m (165 ft 3 in)

==== M55 Discus Throw ====
Pos	Athlete	Age	Country	Result
1st place, gold medalist(s)	Burton Haupt	M55	South Africa	51.19 m (167 ft 11 in)
2nd place, silver medalist(s)	Arnaud Dupuis	M55	France	45.11 m (147 ft 11 in)
3rd place, bronze medalist(s)	Saulius Svilainis	M57	Lithuania	43.54 m (142 ft 10 in)

==== M60 Discus Throw ====
Pos	Athlete	Age	Country	Result
1st place, gold medalist(s)	Ralph Fruguglietti	M61	United States	54.45 m (178 ft 7 in)
2nd place, silver medalist(s)	Thomas Gravestock	M61	Australia	47.13 m (154 ft 7 in)
3rd place, bronze medalist(s)	Edward Zwolski	M60	Poland	46.42 m (152 ft 3 in)

==== M65 Discus Throw ====
Pos	Athlete	Age	Country	Result
1st place, gold medalist(s)	Leszek Bobrzyk	M68	Poland	45.82 m (150 ft 3 in)
2nd place, silver medalist(s)	Arild Busterud	M68	Norway	45.36 m (148 ft 9 in)
3rd place, bronze medalist(s)	Lembit Talpsepp	M66	Estonia	44.47 m (145 ft 10 in)

==== M70 Discus Throw ====
Pos	Athlete	Age	Country	Result
1st place, gold medalist(s)	William Harvey	M70	United States	37.93 m (124 ft 5 in)
2nd place, silver medalist(s)	Knud Hoeyer	M70	Denmark	37.51 m (123 ft 0 in)
3rd place, bronze medalist(s)	Rein Kaljumäe	M72	Estonia	36.82 m (120 ft 9 in)

==== M75 Discus Throw ====
Pos	Athlete	Age	Country	Result
1st place, gold medalist(s)	Roger Busch	M75	United States	43.17 m (141 ft 7 in)
2nd place, silver medalist(s)	Czeslaw Roszczak	M75	Poland	39.44 m (129 ft 4 in)
3rd place, bronze medalist(s)	Dick Schrieken	M76	Netherlands	38.92 m (127 ft 8 in)

==== M80 Discus Throw ====
Pos	Athlete	Age	Country	Result
1st place, gold medalist(s)	Kaarle Tuovinen	M80	Finland	33.64 m (110 ft 4 in)
2nd place, silver medalist(s)	Thomas Hancock	M80	Australia	31.88 m (104 ft 7 in)
3rd place, bronze medalist(s)	Kjartan Sølvberg	M80	Norway	29.85 m (97 ft 11 in)

==== M85 Discus Throw ====
Pos	Athlete	Age	Country	Result
1st place, gold medalist(s)	Leo Saarinen	M87	Finland	21.77 m (71 ft 5 in)
2nd place, silver medalist(s)	Dave Douglass	M85	United States	18.90 m (62 ft 0 in)
3rd place, bronze medalist(s)	Manfred Kunze	M85	Germany	17.12 m (56 ft 2 in)

==== M90 Discus Throw ====
Pos	Athlete	Age	Country	Result
1st place, gold medalist(s)	Maurice Dauphinet	M90	Australia	19.12 m (62 ft 8 in)
2nd place, silver medalist(s)	Sudarshanam Pakerla	M93	India	17.83 m (58 ft 5 in)
3rd place, bronze medalist(s)	Peter Tearle	M90	New Zealand	12.86 m (42 ft 2 in)

=== Hammer Throw ===
==== M35 Hammer throw ====
Pos	Athlete	Age	Country	Result
1st place, gold medalist(s)	Jamie Muscat	M39	Australia	48.32 m (158 ft 6 in)
2nd place, silver medalist(s)	Frederic Barteau	M35	France	46.58 m (152 ft 9 in)
3rd place, bronze medalist(s)	Mike Scholten	M38	New Zealand	45.20 m (148 ft 3 in)

==== M40 Hammer throw ====
Pos	Athlete	Age	Country	Result
1st place, gold medalist(s)	Ricard Meiring	M42	Australia	53.06 m (174 ft 0 in)
2nd place, silver medalist(s)	Matthew Staunton	M42	Australia	45.63 m (149 ft 8 in)
3rd place, bronze medalist(s)	Slawomir Borowski	M41	Poland	40.72 m (133 ft 7 in)

==== M45 Hammer throw ====
Pos	Athlete	Age	Country	Result
1st place, gold medalist(s)	Fábián Zoltán	M47	Hungary	63.97 m (209 ft 10 in)
2nd place, silver medalist(s)	Mariusz Walczak	M45	Poland	61.17 m (200 ft 8 in)
3rd place, bronze medalist(s)	Adrian Marzo	M48	Argentina	57.41 m (188 ft 4 in)

==== M50 Hammer throw ====
Pos	Athlete	Age	Country	Result
1st place, gold medalist(s)	Mark Cumming	M54	New Zealand	54.31 m (178 ft 2 in)
2nd place, silver medalist(s)	Stephen Whyte	M52	Great Britain	52.12 m (170 ft 11 in)
3rd place, bronze medalist(s)	Jari Matinolli	M51	Finland	50.81 m (166 ft 8 in)

==== M55 Hammer throw ====
Pos	Athlete	Age	Country	Result
1st place, gold medalist(s)	Phillip Spivey	M55	Great Britain	60.08 m (197 ft 1 in)
2nd place, silver medalist(s)	Gottfried Gassenbauer	M58	Austria	54.79 m (179 ft 9 in)
3rd place, bronze medalist(s)	Burton Haupt	M55	South Africa	50.27 m (164 ft 11 in)

==== M60 Hammer throw ====
Pos	Athlete	Age	Country	Result
1st place, gold medalist(s)	Lucien Noluveau	M60	France	46.38 m (152 ft 1 in)
2nd place, silver medalist(s)	Edward Zwolski	M60	Poland	45.27 m (148 ft 6 in)
3rd place, bronze medalist(s)	Jan Voigt	M62	Germany	45.23 m (148 ft 4 in)

==== M65 Hammer throw ====
Pos	Athlete	Age	Country	Result
1st place, gold medalist(s)	Arild Busterud	M68	Norway	54.46 m (178 ft 8 in)
2nd place, silver medalist(s)	Kenneth Jansson	M66	Sweden	46.97 m (154 ft 1 in)
3rd place, bronze medalist(s)	Lembit Talpsepp	M66	Estonia	46.35 m (152 ft 0 in)

==== M70 Hammer throw ====
Pos	Athlete	Age	Country	Result
1st place, gold medalist(s)	Gerard Guyot	M71	France	52.78 m (173 ft 1 in)
2nd place, silver medalist(s)	Heimo Viertbauer	M72	Austria	51.60 m (169 ft 3 in)
3rd place, bronze medalist(s)	Jerzy Jablonski	M71	Poland	50.61 m (166 ft 0 in)

==== M75 Hammer throw ====
Pos	Athlete	Age	Country	Result
1st place, gold medalist(s)	Esko Palviainen	M75	Finland	44.61 m (146 ft 4 in)
2nd place, silver medalist(s)	Hiroshi Yamada	M75	Japan	38.84 m (127 ft 5 in)
3rd place, bronze medalist(s)	Eiichiro Yamada	M76	Japan	37.90 m (124 ft 4 in)

==== M80 Hammer throw ====
Pos	Athlete	Age	Country	Result
1st place, gold medalist(s)	Andrzej Rzepecki	M80	South Africa	44.05 m (144 ft 6 in)
2nd place, silver medalist(s)	Thomas Hancock	M80	Australia	39.61 m (129 ft 11 in)
3rd place, bronze medalist(s)	Warwick Dixon	M81	Great Britain	38.57 m (126 ft 6 in)

==== M85 Hammer throw ====
Pos	Athlete	Age	Country	Result
1st place, gold medalist(s)	Arne Sæther	M85	Norway	28.37 m (93 ft 0 in)
2nd place, silver medalist(s)	Leo Saarinen	M87	Finland	28.24 m (92 ft 7 in)
3rd place, bronze medalist(s)	Dave Douglass	M85	United States	27.32 m (89 ft 7 in)

==== M90 Hammer throw ====
Pos	Athlete	Age	Country	Result
1st place, gold medalist(s)	Maurice Dauphinet	M90	Australia	16.41 m (53 ft 10 in)
2nd place, silver medalist(s)	Basil Henney	M91	Canada	8.49 m (27 ft 10 in)

=== Javelin Throw ===
==== M35 Javelin Throw ====
Pos	Athlete	Age	Country	Result
1st place, gold medalist(s)	Dominik Lewin	M36	Germany	60.43 m (198 ft 3 in)
2nd place, silver medalist(s)	Terry Halley Scott	M38	United States	60.11 m (197 ft 2 in)
3rd place, bronze medalist(s)	Thomas Farr	M37	Australia	53.18 m (174 ft 5 in)

==== M40 Javelin Throw ====
Pos	Athlete	Age	Country	Result
1st place, gold medalist(s)	Danilo Fresnido	M44	Philippines	62.30 m (204 ft 4 in)
2nd place, silver medalist(s)	Harri Leivonen	M40	Finland	54.92 m (180 ft 2 in)
3rd place, bronze medalist(s)	Ved Singh Prakash	M40	India	52.38 m (171 ft 10 in)

==== M45 Javelin Throw ====
Pos	Athlete	Age	Country	Result
1st place, gold medalist(s)	Peter Esenwein	M48	Germany	65.03 m (213 ft 4 in)
2nd place, silver medalist(s)	Tommi Huotilainen	M48	Finland	62.03 m (203 ft 6 in)
3rd place, bronze medalist(s)	Stefan Petersson	M49	United States	58.60 m (192 ft 3 in)

==== M50 Javelin Throw ====
Pos	Athlete	Age	Country	Result
1st place, gold medalist(s)	Torsten Heinrich	M51	Germany	57.91 m (189 ft 11 in)
2nd place, silver medalist(s)	Clayton Dennis	M54	United States	54.18 m (177 ft 9 in)
3rd place, bronze medalist(s)	Stephen Liggins	M51	Australia	49.20 m (161 ft 5 in)

==== M55 Javelin Throw ====
Pos	Athlete	Age	Country	Result
1st place, gold medalist(s)	Masayoshi Sakaguchi	M55	Japan	55.31 m (181 ft 5 in)
2nd place, silver medalist(s)	Troy Dietz	M55	United States	54.84 m (179 ft 11 in)
3rd place, bronze medalist(s)	Joachim Pohl	M56	Germany	54.49 m (178 ft 9 in)

==== M60 Javelin Throw ====
Pos	Athlete	Age	Country	Result
1st place, gold medalist(s)	Josef Schaffarzik	M61	Germany	48.46 m (158 ft 11 in)
2nd place, silver medalist(s)	Lars Greiff	M60	Norway	45.03 m (147 ft 8 in)
3rd place, bronze medalist(s)	Thomas Nielsen	M64	United States	44.14 m (144 ft 9 in)

==== M65 Javelin Throw ====
Pos	Athlete	Age	Country	Result
1st place, gold medalist(s)	Teuvo Kemppainen	M65	Finland	49.44 m (162 ft 2 in)
2nd place, silver medalist(s)	Buzz Gagne	M69	United States	47.29 m (155 ft 1 in)
3rd place, bronze medalist(s)	Hannu Kortesluoma	M65	Finland	41.98 m (137 ft 8 in)

==== M70 Javelin Throw ====
Pos	Athlete	Age	Country	Result
1st place, gold medalist(s)	Helmut Hessert	M70	Germany	40.18 m (131 ft 9 in)
2nd place, silver medalist(s)	Olav Egeland	M71	Norway	39.19 m (128 ft 6 in)
3rd place, bronze medalist(s)	Norbert Röhrle	M74	Germany	38.21 m (125 ft 4 in)

==== M75 Javelin Throw ====
Pos	Athlete	Age	Country	Result
1st place, gold medalist(s)	Jouni Tenhu	M77	Finland	39.33 m (129 ft 0 in)
2nd place, silver medalist(s)	Czeslaw Roszczak	M75	Poland	33.67 m (110 ft 5 in)
3rd place, bronze medalist(s)	Guy Quarterman	M75	Australia	33.35 m (109 ft 4 in)

==== M80 Javelin Throw ====
Pos	Athlete	Age	Country	Result
1st place, gold medalist(s)	Osamu Yoshikawa	M80	Japan	35.55 m (116 ft 7 in)
2nd place, silver medalist(s)	Thomas Hancock	M80	Australia	32.88 m (107 ft 10 in)
3rd place, bronze medalist(s)	Marko Sluga	M81	Slovenia	27.18 m (89 ft 2 in)

==== M85 Javelin Throw ====
Pos	Athlete	Age	Country	Result
1st place, gold medalist(s)	Dave Douglass	M85	United States	20.37 m (66 ft 9 in)
2nd place, silver medalist(s)	Manfred Kunze	M85	Germany	17.06 m (55 ft 11 in)
3rd place, bronze medalist(s)	Christian Tittel	M88	Australia	11.42 m (37 ft 5 in)

==== M90 Javelin Throw ====
Pos	Athlete	Age	Country	Result
1st place, gold medalist(s)	Maurice Dauphinet	M90	Australia	17.10 m (56 ft 1 in)
2nd place, silver medalist(s)	Sudarshanam Pakerla	M93	India	16.95 m (55 ft 7 in)
3rd place, bronze medalist(s)	Basil Henney	M91	Canada	14.29 m (46 ft 10 in)

=== Weight Throw ===
==== M35 Weight Throw ====
Pos	Athlete	Age	Country	Result
1st place, gold medalist(s)	Jamie Muscat	M39	Australia	15.35 m (50 ft 4 1/4 in)
2nd place, silver medalist(s)	Darrin Norwood	M37	Australia	15.30 m (50 ft 2 1/4 in)
3rd place, bronze medalist(s)	Mike Scholten	M38	New Zealand	13.82 m (45 ft 4 in)

==== M40 Weight Throw ====
Pos	Athlete	Age	Country	Result
1st place, gold medalist(s)	Ricard Meiring	M42	Australia	16.65 m (54 ft 7 1/2 in)
2nd place, silver medalist(s)	Matthew Staunton	M42	Australia	13.69 m (44 ft 10 3/4 in)
3rd place, bronze medalist(s)	Robert Fettus	M43	Australia	12.44 m (40 ft 9 3/4 in)

==== M45 Weight Throw ====
Pos	Athlete	Age	Country	Result
1st place, gold medalist(s)	Mariusz Walczak	M45	Poland	19.28 m (63 ft 3 in)
2nd place, silver medalist(s)	Martin Venter	M46	South Africa	16.86 m (55 ft 3 3/4 in)
3rd place, bronze medalist(s)	Adrian Marzo	M48	Argentina	15.99 m (52 ft 5 1/2 in)

==== M50 Weight Throw ====
Pos	Athlete	Age	Country	Result
1st place, gold medalist(s)	Stephen Whyte	M52	Great Britain	19.65 m (64 ft 5 1/2 in)
2nd place, silver medalist(s)	Mark Cumming	M54	New Zealand	18.73 m (61 ft 5 1/4 in)
3rd place, bronze medalist(s)	Leif Lundahl	M50	Sweden	17.82 m (58 ft 5 1/2 in)

==== M55 Weight Throw ====
Pos	Athlete	Age	Country	Result
1st place, gold medalist(s)	Phillip Spivey	M55	Great Britain	20.68 m (67 ft 10 in)
2nd place, silver medalist(s)	Burton Haupt	M55	South Africa	18.90 m (62 ft 0 in)
3rd place, bronze medalist(s)	Gottfried Gassenbauer	M58	Austria	16.89 m (55 ft 4 3/4 in)

==== M60 Weight Throw ====
Pos	Athlete	Age	Country	Result
1st place, gold medalist(s)	Lucien Noluveau	M60	France	17.75 m (58 ft 2 3/4 in)
2nd place, silver medalist(s)	Edward Zwolski	M60	Poland	17.38 m (57 ft 1/4 in)
3rd place, bronze medalist(s)	Geoffrey Gee	M63	Australia	16.99 m (55 ft 8 3/4 in)

==== M65 Weight Throw ====
Pos	Athlete	Age	Country	Result
1st place, gold medalist(s)	Arild Busterud	M68	Norway	21.15 m (69 ft 4 1/2 in)
2nd place, silver medalist(s)	Kenneth Jansson	M66	Sweden	18.61 m (61 ft 1/2 in)
3rd place, bronze medalist(s)	Andrzej Piaczkowski	M66	Poland	17.75 m (58 ft 2 3/4 in)

==== M70 Weight Throw ====
Pos	Athlete	Age	Country	Result
1st place, gold medalist(s)	Heimo Viertbauer	M72	Austria	19.65 m (64 ft 5 1/2 in)
2nd place, silver medalist(s)	Jerzy Jablonski	M71	Poland	18.80 m (61 ft 8 in)
3rd place, bronze medalist(s)	Gerard Guyot	M71	France	18.54 m (60 ft 9 3/4 in)

==== M75 Weight Throw ====
Pos	Athlete	Age	Country	Result
1st place, gold medalist(s)	Esko Palviainen	M75	Finland	18.47 m (60 ft 7 in)
2nd place, silver medalist(s)	Czeslaw Roszczak	M75	Poland	16.23 m (53 ft 2 3/4 in)
3rd place, bronze medalist(s)	Hiroshi Yamada	M75	Japan	15.06 m (49 ft 4 3/4 in)

==== M80 Weight Throw ====
Pos	Athlete	Age	Country	Result
1st place, gold medalist(s)	Andrzej Rzepecki	M80	South Africa	19.06 m (62 ft 6 1/4 in)
2nd place, silver medalist(s)	Henryk Plukarz	M83	Poland	16.15 m (52 ft 11 3/4 in)
3rd place, bronze medalist(s)	Thomas Hancock	M80	Australia	14.97 m (49 ft 1 1/4 in)

==== M85 Weight Throw ====
Pos	Athlete	Age	Country	Result
1st place, gold medalist(s)	Dave Douglass	M85	United States	11.54 m (37 ft 10 1/4 in)
2nd place, silver medalist(s)	Leo Saarinen	M87	Finland	11.47 m (37 ft 7 1/2 in)
3rd place, bronze medalist(s)	Arne Sæther	M85	Norway	11.27 m (36 ft 11 1/2 in)

==== M90 Weight Throw ====
Pos	Athlete	Age	Country	Result
1st place, gold medalist(s)	Basil Henney	M91	Canada	5.13 m (16 ft 9 3/4 in)

=== Decathlon ===
==== M35 Decathlon ====
Pos	Athlete	Age	Country	Result
1st place, gold medalist(s)	Olivier Guilhem	M38	France	6158
2nd place, silver medalist(s)	Laurent Jobard	M37	France	6139
3rd place, bronze medalist(s)	Vincent Kerssies	M36	Netherlands	5865

==== M40 Decathlon ====
Pos	Athlete	Age	Country	Result
1st place, gold medalist(s)	Geoffrey Gibbons	M40	Australia	7496
2nd place, silver medalist(s)	Paul Jeffery	M42	Australia	7388
3rd place, bronze medalist(s)	Jeferson Souza	M42	United States	7054

==== M45 Decathlon ====
Pos	Athlete	Age	Country	Result
1st place, gold medalist(s)	Mattias Sunneborn	M46	Sweden	7508
2nd place, silver medalist(s)	Mark Jeffery	M46	Australia	7169
3rd place, bronze medalist(s)	Christian Hoser	M49	Austria	6445

==== M50 Decathlon ====
Pos	Athlete	Age	Country	Result
1st place, gold medalist(s)	Granillo Díaz Angel Est	M54	Guatemala	7339
2nd place, silver medalist(s)	Stephan Kallenberg	M53	Germany	6594
3rd place, bronze medalist(s)	Wayne Doyle	M52	New Zealand	6333

==== M55 Decathlon ====
Pos	Athlete	Age	Country	Result
1st place, gold medalist(s)	Giorgio Spagnoli	M55	Italy	6690
2nd place, silver medalist(s)	Kenneth Thomas	M59	United States	6282
3rd place, bronze medalist(s)	Peter Murray	M55	Australia	6130

==== M60 Decathlon ====
Pos	Athlete	Age	Country	Result
1st place, gold medalist(s)	Noel Ruebel	M60	United States	6912
2nd place, silver medalist(s)	Mark Mclean	M60	Australia	6445
3rd place, bronze medalist(s)	Klaus-Peter Neuendorf	M62	Germany	6343

==== M65 Decathlon ====
Pos	Athlete	Age	Country	Result
1st place, gold medalist(s)	Valdis Cela	M68	Latvia	6801
2nd place, silver medalist(s)	Lasse Kyrö	M67	Finland	5304
3rd place, bronze medalist(s)	Thomas Partzsch	M69	Germany	5245

==== M70 Decathlon ====
Pos	Athlete	Age	Country	Result
1st place, gold medalist(s)	David Anstiss	M71	New Zealand	5716
2nd place, silver medalist(s)	Peter Kennedy	M70	Australia	5232
3rd place, bronze medalist(s)	Herbert Mattle	M70	Switzerland	5162

==== M75 Decathlon ====
Pos	Athlete	Age	Country	Result
1st place, gold medalist(s)	Kyösti Poutiainen	M75	Finland	6572
2nd place, silver medalist(s)	Jim Poulter	M75	Australia	5162
3rd place, bronze medalist(s)	John Parks	M77	United States	4998

==== M80 Decathlon ====
Pos	Athlete	Age	Country	Result
1st place, gold medalist(s)	Kjartan Sølvberg	M80	Norway	6316

==== M85 Decathlon ====
Pos	Athlete	Age	Country	Result
1st place, gold medalist(s)	Mario Calderon Cesar	M85	Guatemala	4883
2nd place, silver medalist(s)	Ake Lund	M86	Finland	4395
3rd place, bronze medalist(s)	Pengxue Su	M89	China	2880

=== Throws Pentathlon ===
==== M35 Throws Pentathlon ====
Pos	Athlete	Age	Country	Result
1st place, gold medalist(s)	Petros Mitsides	M38	Cyprus	3532
2nd place, silver medalist(s)	Darrin Norwood	M37	Australia	3289
3rd place, bronze medalist(s)	Mike Scholten	M38	New Zealand	2882

==== M40 Throws Pentathlon ====
Pos	Athlete	Age	Country	Result
1st place, gold medalist(s)	Matthew Staunton	M42	Australia	3247
2nd place, silver medalist(s)	Ricard Meiring	M42	Australia	3103
3rd place, bronze medalist(s)	Harri Leivonen	M40	Finland	3015

==== M45 Throws Pentathlon ====
Pos	Athlete	Age	Country	Result
1st place, gold medalist(s)	Mariusz Walczak	M45	Poland	4120
2nd place, silver medalist(s)	Pavel Penaz	M47	Czech Republic	4104
3rd place, bronze medalist(s)	Martin Venter	M46	South Africa	3526

==== M50 Throws Pentathlon ====
Pos	Athlete	Age	Country	Result
1st place, gold medalist(s)	Stephen Whyte	M52	Great Britain	3944
2nd place, silver medalist(s)	Todd Davey	M50	Australia	3684
3rd place, bronze medalist(s)	Matthew Lovell	M50	Australia	2666

==== M55 Throws Pentathlon ====
Pos	Athlete	Age	Country	Result
1st place, gold medalist(s)	Burton Haupt	M55	South Africa	4800R
2nd place, silver medalist(s)	Arnaud Dupuis	M55	France	3998
3rd place, bronze medalist(s)	Joachim Pohl	M56	Germany	3949

==== M60 Throws Pentathlon ====
Pos	Athlete	Age	Country	Result
1st place, gold medalist(s)	Edward Zwolski	M60	Poland	3993
2nd place, silver medalist(s)	Miro Prstec	M60	Slovenia	3787
3rd place, bronze medalist(s)	Geoffrey Gee	M63	Australia	3676

==== M65 Throws Pentathlon ====
Pos	Athlete	Age	Country	Result
1st place, gold medalist(s)	Arild Busterud	M68	Norway	4853
2nd place, silver medalist(s)	Lembit Talpsepp	M66	Estonia	4368
3rd place, bronze medalist(s)	Kenneth Jansson	M66	Sweden	4241

==== M70 Throws Pentathlon ====
Pos	Athlete	Age	Country	Result
1st place, gold medalist(s)	Knud Hoeyer	M70	Denmark	3811
2nd place, silver medalist(s)	Rein Kaljumäe	M72	Estonia	3570
3rd place, bronze medalist(s)	Jerzy Jablonski	M71	Poland	3532

==== M75 Throws Pentathlon ====
Pos	Athlete	Age	Country	Result
1st place, gold medalist(s)	Czeslaw Roszczak	M75	Poland	4516
2nd place, silver medalist(s)	Esko Palviainen	M75	Finland	4377
3rd place, bronze medalist(s)	Jouni Tenhu	M77	Finland	4215

==== M80 Throws Pentathlon ====
Pos	Athlete	Age	Country	Result
1st place, gold medalist(s)	Andrzej Rzepecki	M80	South Africa	4947
2nd place, silver medalist(s)	Thomas Hancock	M80	Australia	4741
3rd place, bronze medalist(s)	Finn Ankerstjerne	M80	Denmark	3542

==== M85 Throws Pentathlon ====
Pos	Athlete	Age	Country	Result
1st place, gold medalist(s)	Arne Sæther	M85	Norway	3593
2nd place, silver medalist(s)	Leo Saarinen	M87	Finland	3458
3rd place, bronze medalist(s)	Dave Douglass	M85	United States	3111

==== M90 Throws Pentathlon ====
Pos	Athlete	Age	Country	Result
1st place, gold medalist(s)	Basil Henney	M91	Canada	1825

=== 5000 metres Racewalk ===
==== M35 5000 metres Racewalk ====
Pos	Athlete	Age	Country	Result
1st place, gold medalist(s)	Andris Alksnis	M39	Latvia	24:22.44
2nd place, silver medalist(s)	Gordillo Carmona Franci	M38	Spain	25:48.84

==== M40 5000 metres Racewalk ====
Pos	Athlete	Age	Country	Result
1st place, gold medalist(s)	Dmitry Babenko	M43	Canada	22:15.37
2nd place, silver medalist(s)	Normunds Ivzans	M44	Latvia	22:25.68
3rd place, bronze medalist(s)	Alvarez Piñera Rubén	M41	Spain	22:50.61

==== M45 5000 metres Racewalk ====
Pos	Athlete	Age	Country	Result
1st place, gold medalist(s)	James Christmass	M48	Australia	23:17.38
2nd place, silver medalist(s)	Stuart Kollmorgen	M47	Australia	23:31.73
3rd place, bronze medalist(s)	Dean Nipperess	M45	Australia	23:49.00

==== M50 5000 metres Racewalk ====
Pos	Athlete	Age	Country	Result
1st place, gold medalist(s)	Rodrigo Munar Moreno	M50	Colombia	23:18.79
2nd place, silver medalist(s)	Steffen Meyer	M50	Germany	23:29.99
3rd place, bronze medalist(s)	David Swarts	M51	United States	24:18.23

==== M55 5000 metres Racewalk ====
Pos	Athlete	Age	Country	Result
1st place, gold medalist(s)	Sergio Brenes Gutiérrez	M55	Costa Rica	24:46.33
2nd place, silver medalist(s)	Andrea Naso	M55	Italy	25:39.38
3rd place, bronze medalist(s)	Palacin Abadias Luis	M56	Spain	26:25.52

==== M60 5000 metres Racewalk ====
Pos	Athlete	Age	Country	Result
1st place, gold medalist(s)	Mike Parker	M63	New Zealand	25:39.11
2nd place, silver medalist(s)	Colin Heywood	M62	Australia	25:58.20
3rd place, bronze medalist(s)	Miroslav Fliegl	M61	Czech Republic	26:33.09

==== M65 5000 metres Racewalk ====
Pos	Athlete	Age	Country	Result
1st place, gold medalist(s)	Jose Luis Camarena Lopez	M67	Mexico	24:30.30
2nd place, silver medalist(s)	Ian Richards	M68	Great Britain	24:55.00
3rd place, bronze medalist(s)	Eric Kemsley	M65	New Zealand	26:53.78

==== M70 5000 metres Racewalk ====
Pos	Athlete	Age	Country	Result
1st place, gold medalist(s)	Andrew Jamieson	M70	Australia	26:42.08
2nd place, silver medalist(s)	Norman Frable	M71	United States	29:25.68
3rd place, bronze medalist(s)	Fernand Rabatel	M70	France	29:41.07

==== M75 5000 metres Racewalk ====
Pos	Athlete	Age	Country	Result
1st place, gold medalist(s)	Christoph Höhne	M75	Germany	32:20.71
2nd place, silver medalist(s)	Jim Seymon	M79	Australia	33:38.15
3rd place, bronze medalist(s)	Edmund Shillabeer	M77	Great Britain	33:42.46

==== M80 5000 metres Racewalk ====
Pos	Athlete	Age	Country	Result
1st place, gold medalist(s)	Norbert Will	M81	Great Britain	36:05.97
2nd place, silver medalist(s)	Colin Silcock-Delaney	M84	Australia	39:25.87
3rd place, bronze medalist(s)	Ian Beaumont	M80	Australia	44:53.87

==== M85 5000 metres Racewalk ====
Pos	Athlete	Age	Country	Result
1st place, gold medalist(s)	Ivan Pushkin	M86	Ukraine	37:04.58
2nd place, silver medalist(s)	Colin Hainsworth	M86	Australia	44:32.60

==== M90 5000 metres Racewalk ====
Pos	Athlete	Age	Country	Result
1st place, gold medalist(s)	Sriramu Vallabhajosyula	M92	India	45:15.85
2nd place, silver medalist(s)	Peter Tearle	M90	New Zealand	48:56.81

=== 10,000 metres race walk ===
==== M35 10,000 metres race walk ====
Pos	Athlete	Age	Country	Result
1st place, gold medalist(s)	Andris Alksnis	M39	Latvia	50:42
2nd place, silver medalist(s)	Gordillo Carmona Franci	M38	Spain	52:21
3rd place, bronze medalist(s)	John Graniffo	M39	Chile	1:02:38

==== M40 10,000 metres race walk ====
Pos	Athlete	Age	Country	Result
1st place, gold medalist(s)	Normunds Ivzans	M44	Latvia	46:26
2nd place, silver medalist(s)	Dmitry Babenko	M43	Canada	46:59
3rd place, bronze medalist(s)	Etiel Soto	M44	Mexico	48:15

==== M45 10,000 metres race walk ====
Pos	Athlete	Age	Country	Result
1st place, gold medalist(s)	Stuart Kollmorgen	M47	Australia	49:08
2nd place, silver medalist(s)	James Christmass	M48	Australia	50:00
3rd place, bronze medalist(s)	Dean Nipperess	M45	Australia	50:19

==== M50 10,000 metres race walk ====
Pos	Athlete	Age	Country	Result
1st place, gold medalist(s)	Miguel Periañez	M53	Spain	47:36
2nd place, silver medalist(s)	Munar Moreno Rodrigo	M50	Colombia	47:41
3rd place, bronze medalist(s)	Steffen Meyer	M50	Germany	48:50

==== M55 10,000 metres race walk ====
Pos	Athlete	Age	Country	Result
1st place, gold medalist(s)	Sergio Brenes Gutiérrez	M55	Costa Rica	50:29
2nd place, silver medalist(s)	Andrea Naso	M55	Italy	52:57
3rd place, bronze medalist(s)	Mark Donahoo	M58	Australia	54:10

==== M60 10,000 metres race walk ====
Pos	Athlete	Age	Country	Result
1st place, gold medalist(s)	Colin Heywood	M62	Australia	52:31
2nd place, silver medalist(s)	Mike Parker	M63	New Zealand	53:35
3rd place, bronze medalist(s)	Michelle De Masis	M60	Italy	54:27

==== M65 10,000 metres race walk ====
Pos	Athlete	Age	Country	Result
1st place, gold medalist(s)	Jose Luis Camarena Lopez	M67	Mexico	51:30
2nd place, silver medalist(s)	Ian Richards	M68	Great Britain	52:27
3rd place, bronze medalist(s)	Eric Kemsley	M65	New Zealand	56:14

==== M70 10,000 metres race walk ====
Pos	Athlete	Age	Country	Result
1st place, gold medalist(s)	Andrew Jamieson	M70	Australia	53:37
2nd place, silver medalist(s)	Norman Frable	M71	United States	59:54
3rd place, bronze medalist(s)	Fernand Rabatel	M70	France	1:00:02

==== M75 10,000 metres race walk ====
Pos	Athlete	Age	Country	Result
1st place, gold medalist(s)	Christoph Höhne	M75	Germany	1:05:22
2nd place, silver medalist(s)	Edmund Shillabeer	M77	Great Britain	1:08:14
3rd place, bronze medalist(s)	Coppet de Alexis	M78	Switzerland	1:10:31

==== M80 10,000 metres race walk ====
Pos	Athlete	Age	Country	Result
1st place, gold medalist(s)	Robert Gardiner	M80	Australia	1:10:33
2nd place, silver medalist(s)	Norbert Will	M81	Great Britain	1:16:18
3rd place, bronze medalist(s)	Ian Beaumont	M80	Australia	1:29:22

==== M85 10,000 metres race walk ====
Pos	Athlete	Age	Country	Result
1st place, gold medalist(s)	Ivan Pushkin	M86	Ukraine	1:14:03
2nd place, silver medalist(s)	Colin Hainsworth	M86	Australia	1:28:25

==== M90 10,000 metres race walk ====
Pos	Athlete	Age	Country	Result
1st place, gold medalist(s)	Sriramu Vallabhajosyula	M92	India	3:28:37
2nd place, silver medalist(s)	Peter Tearle	M90	New Zealand	3:29:25

=== 20,000 metres race walk ===
==== M35 20,000 metres race walk ====
Pos	Athlete	Age	Country	Result
1st place, gold medalist(s)	Andris Alksnis	M39	Latvia	1:50:05
2nd place, silver medalist(s)	Gordillo Carmona Franci	M38	Spain	1:54:05
3rd place, bronze medalist(s)	John Graniffo	M39	Chile	2:09:06

==== M40 20,000 metres race walk ====
Pos	Athlete	Age	Country	Result
1st place, gold medalist(s)	Dmitry Babenko	M43	Canada	1:37:28
2nd place, silver medalist(s)	Normunds Ivzans	M44	Latvia	1:37:33
3rd place, bronze medalist(s)	Etiel Soto	M44	Mexico	1:42:41

==== M45 20,000 metres race walk ====
Pos	Athlete	Age	Country	Result
1st place, gold medalist(s)	Christer Svensson	M46	Sweden	1:46:39
2nd place, silver medalist(s)	Dean Nipperess	M45	Australia	1:49:52
3rd place, bronze medalist(s)	Stuart Kollmorgen	M47	Australia	1:51:42

==== M50 20,000 metres race walk ====
Pos	Athlete	Age	Country	Result
1st place, gold medalist(s)	Munar Moreno Rodrigo	M50	Colombia	1:40:27
2nd place, silver medalist(s)	Miguel Periañez	M53	Spain	1:42:10
3rd place, bronze medalist(s)	Walter Arena Salvatore	M52	Italy	1:43:51

==== M55 20,000 metres race walk ====
Pos	Athlete	Age	Country	Result
1st place, gold medalist(s)	Sergio Brenes Gutiérrez	M55	Costa Rica	1:48:20
2nd place, silver medalist(s)	Andrea Naso	M55	Italy	1:55:37
3rd place, bronze medalist(s)	Miroslaw Luniewski	M59	Poland	1:55:56

==== M60 20,000 metres race walk ====
Pos	Athlete	Age	Country	Result
1st place, gold medalist(s)	Colin Heywood	M62	Australia	1:51:16
2nd place, silver medalist(s)	Helmut Prieler	M61	Germany	1:54:26
3rd place, bronze medalist(s)	Miroslav Fliegl	M61	Czech Republic	1:55:30

==== M65 20,000 metres race walk ====
Pos	Athlete	Age	Country	Result
1st place, gold medalist(s)	Jose Luis Camarena Lopez	M67	Mexico	1:53:02
2nd place, silver medalist(s)	Eric Kemsley	M65	New Zealand	2:00:41
3rd place, bronze medalist(s)	Peter Boszko	M67	Great Britain	2:05:17

==== M70 20,000 metres race walk ====
Pos	Athlete	Age	Country	Result
1st place, gold medalist(s)	Andrew Jamieson	M70	Australia	2:01:29
2nd place, silver medalist(s)	Fernand Rabatel	M70	France	2:08:13
3rd place, bronze medalist(s)	Norman Frable	M71	United States	2:09:36

==== M75 20,000 metres race walk ====
Pos	Athlete	Age	Country	Result
1st place, gold medalist(s)	Christoph Höhne	M75	Germany	2:17:36
2nd place, silver medalist(s)	Edmund Shillabeer	M77	Great Britain	2:22:53
3rd place, bronze medalist(s)	Zdenek Gonsiorovsky	M75	Czech Republic	2:27:23

==== M80 20,000 metres race walk ====
Pos	Athlete	Age	Country	Result
1st place, gold medalist(s)	Norbert Will	M81	Great Britain	2:52:02

==== M85 20,000 metres race walk ====
Pos	Athlete	Age	Country	Result
1st place, gold medalist(s)	Ivan Pushkin	M86	Ukraine	2:34:31

==== M90 20,000 metres race walk ====
Pos	Athlete	Age	Country	Result
1st place, gold medalist(s)	Sriramu Vallabhajosyula	M92	India	3:11:11

== See also ==
- 2016 World Masters Athletics Championships Women
