= Stewart Marshall =

Stewart Marshall may refer to:

- J. Stewart Marshall (1911-1992), Canadian physicist and meteorologist
- Stewart Marshall (athlete), competitor in 2016 World Masters Athletics Championships Men
