= Gary Patton =

American technologist and business executive

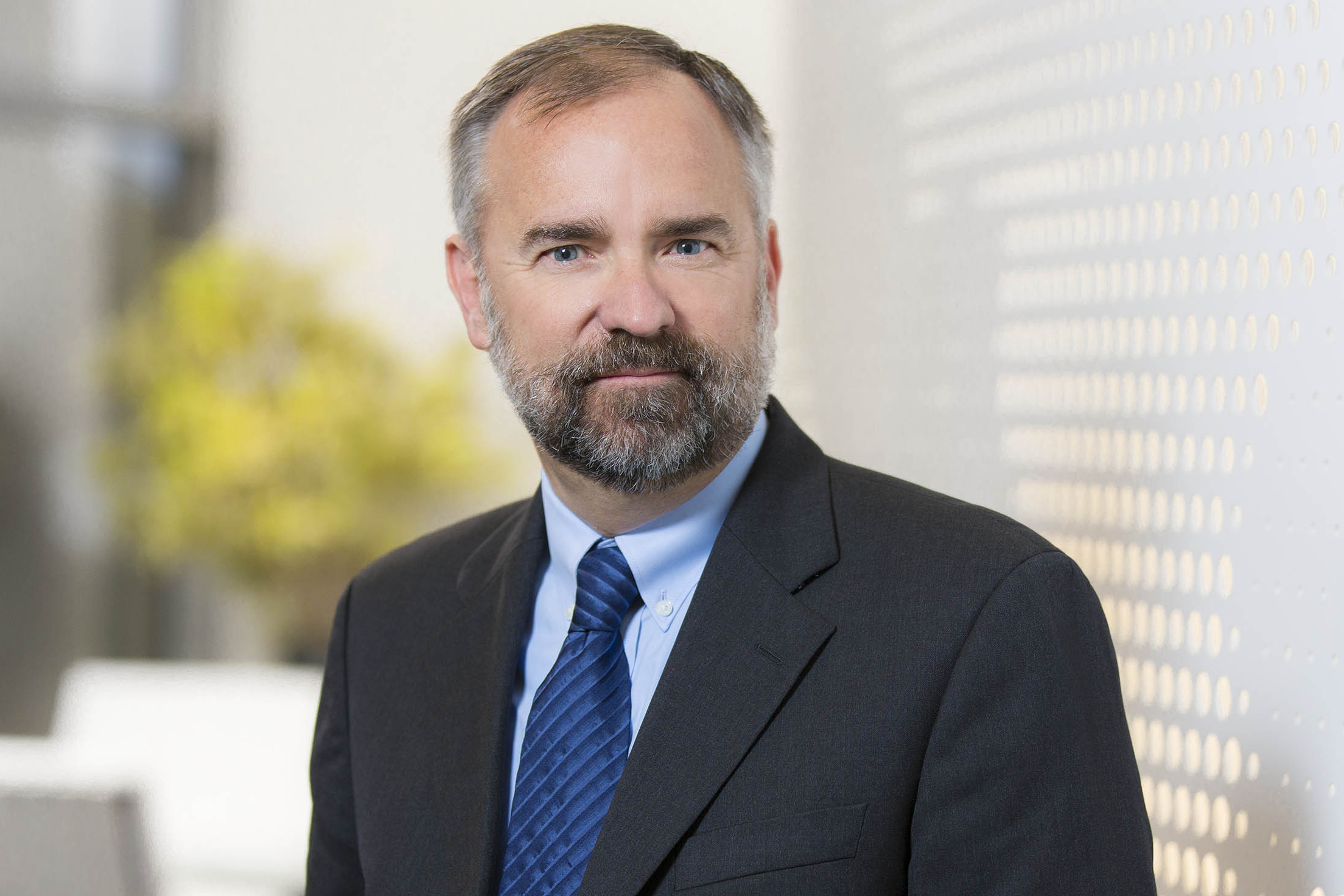
Dr. Gary L. Patton

Dr. Gary Patton is an American technologist and business executive. He is currently the Corporate Vice President and General Manager of the Design Technology Platform organization in the Technology Development Group at Intel. He has spent most of his career in IBM, starting in IBM's Research Division and holding management and executive positions in IBM's Microelectronics Division in Technology Development, Design Enablement, Manufacturing, and Business Line Management.

== Early life and education ==
Dr. Patton was born and raised in Glendale, CA. He received his B.S. degree in electrical engineering from UCLA, where he graduated summa cum laude and Phi Beta Kappa, and his M.S. and Ph.D. degrees in electrical engineering from Stanford University. His Ph.D. work was on the physics of polycrystalline silicon emitters for bipolar transistors. Dr. Patton was the first in his family to attend college.

== Career ==
=== 1986–2015: IBM ===
Dr. Patton was with IBM for almost 30 years, starting in 1986 at IBM's T.J. Watson Research Center. He held management and executive positions in research, technology and product development, manufacturing, and business unit management in IBM's Research, Microelectronics, and Storage Technology Divisions. He was selected to be a member of IBM Corporate's Growth & Transformation Team (G&TT), a group consisting of approximately 300 of the top IBM executives chartered with driving growth and transformation initiatives across the company.

During the last eight years of his career at IBM, Patton was Vice President of IBM's Semiconductor Research and Development Center (SRDC), where he was responsible for IBM's semiconductor R&D roadmap, operations, execution, and technology development alliances. As the head of IBM's SRDC, he led the teams responsible for the development of multiple generations of leading-edge process technologies (45 nm through 7 nm technologies). These technologies powered next-generation IBM servers and a wide range of consumer products, and incorporated major technology innovations such as Silicon-On-Insulator, advanced strain engineering, embedded DRAM memory solutions, high-κ/metal gate and FinFET technologies. Dr. Patton drove the introduction of high performance embedded DRAM memory into IBM microprocessors at 45 nm. By addressing microprocessor memory bandwidth issues, this new technology improved microprocessor performance in multi-core designs, and accelerated the movement of graphics in gaming, networking, and other image intensive, multi-media applications. He also led the development of the IBM Alliance's 32/28 nm high-k.metal gate technologies currently used today in a wide range of consumer and industrial applications. This innovation reduced transistor power requirements while simultaneously delivering improved circuit speed.

During this time, Dr. Patton also led IBM's advanced technology R&D efforts at the State University of New York (SUNY) Polytechnic Institute, pioneering many innovations in collaboration with IBM's research partners. These innovations included the development of 14 nm FinFET technology, which has since been commercialized, and the semiconductor industry's first 7 nm test chips with functioning transistors. Among the novel processes and techniques pioneered at 7 nm were a number of industry-first innovations, most notably Silicon Germanium (SiGe) channel FinFET transistors and the use of Extreme Ultraviolet (EUV) lithography.

Dr. Patton was involved with IBM's technology development alliances from its very beginning in the early 1990s. In 1992, he led the IBM-Siemens-Toshiba 64Mb DRAM technology development team and delivered this technology into manufacturing. He assumed senior management positions in manufacturing engineering and production operations in IBM's Advanced Semiconductor Technology Center, the facility where IBM's technology development alliance work took place. He then served as the Executive Assistant to the Senior Vice President of IBM's Technology Group. This led to Dr. Patton's executive appointment in 1999 as the Director of IBM Microelectronics' Wireless Business Unit. In 2002, he moved to IBM's Storage Technology Division, where he was the Vice President of research and development of magnetic heads and media for IBM's Hard Disk Drive products. IBM sold this business to Hitachi in 2003 and it was merged with Hitachi's Hard Disk Drive business to become Hitachi Global Storage Technology (HGST). He was Vice President & General Manager for HGST's Head & Media Business Unit, as well as the General Manager for HGST's San Jose, CA site. He returned to IBM in 2005 as Vice President of Technology Development in IBM Microelectronics Divisions' SRDC. He was asked to lead the SRDC in 2007. He held this position for eight years, until GlobalFoundries' acquisition of IBM's Microelectronics Division.

During his career at IBM, Patton's pioneering work on SiGe Heterojunction Bipolar Transistors (HBT) created the foundation for today's SiGe HBT BiCMOS technologies which are used in a wide range of wireless communication devices (e.g., cell phones, PDAs, wireless LANs, GPS devices). In the late 1980s, he and a small team of researchers at IBM's T.J. Watson Research Center demonstrated the first working SiGe heterojunction transistor and established a world record for silicon transistor performance, tripling the previous record. They also developed the first manufacturable approach for making a high volume SiGe BiCMOS technology. Later, as the head of IBM Microelectronics' wireless business unit, which was effectively a start-up business at that time, Patton drove industry adoption of IBM's SiGe BiCMOS technology and other radio frequency (RF), analog, and mixed signal technology offerings. Today, most mobile devices contain several chips manufactured using these technologies.

=== 2015–2019: GlobalFoundries ===
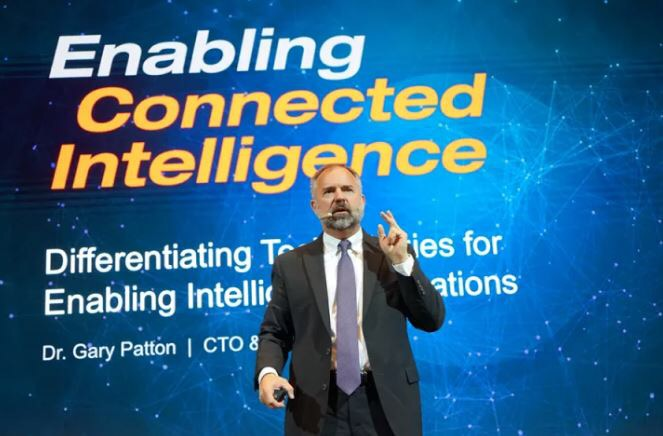
Dr. Gary Patton speaking at GlobalFoundries' Technology Conference in 2017

Patton served as GlobalFoundries’ Chief Technology Office and Senior Vice President of Worldwide R&D and Design Enablement, responsible for the company's semiconductor technology research and development roadmap, operations, and execution. He joined GlobalFoundries in July 2015 with GlobalFoundries' acquisition of IBM's Microelectronics Division. His retirement from Globalfoundries was announced in December 2019

=== 2019–: Intel ===
On December 12, 2019, it was announced that Dr. Patton had joined Intel's Technology Development Group as the Corporate Vice President and General Manager of Design Enablement. His responsibilities include developing cost-effective technology & design platforms which enable products to fully leverage the technology. This includes delivery of Process Design Kits (PDKs), Test-Chips, Design-Technology Co-Optimization (DTCO), and Foundational IP & Embedded Memory Solutions. From February 2022 until February 2023, when he picked up responsibility for Foundational IP development, Dr. Patton served as General Manager of Components Research, in addition to his responsibilities as General Manager of Design Enablement. In this role, he was also responsible for Intel’s research to ensure Moore’s Law scaling continues by achieving breakthrough innovations in novel materials, processes, devices, and packaging. In December 2024, Dr. Patton's role was expanded to include all Intel Foundry design enablement engineering resources as Corporate Vice President and General Manager of the new Design Technology Platform organization, whose responsibilities include delivering the complete design platform solution needed by Intel's Foundry customers.

Additional Information:

Dr. Patton has co-authored over 70 technical papers and given numerous keynote and panel talks at major industry forums (e.g. IEEE Transactions on Electron Devices and Electron Device Letters, International Electron Device Meetings (IEDM), Symposium on VLSI Technology, SEMI ISS and SMC Conferences, Design Automation Conference (DAC), Confab, Common Platform Technology Forum, GlobalFoundries' Technology Conference). He has served on the IEEE Nishizawa Medal and IEEE Grove Field Award Committees, the Semiconductor Research Corporation (SRC) Board, the Confab Advisory Board, the Executive Advisory Committee of SEMI's Semiconductor Components, Instruments, and Subsystems (SCIS) initiative, and on an External Advisory Board for Sandia National Laboratories. He also served as the Technical Program Chairman for the Bipolar Circuits and Technology Conference (BCTM).

== Awards and honors ==
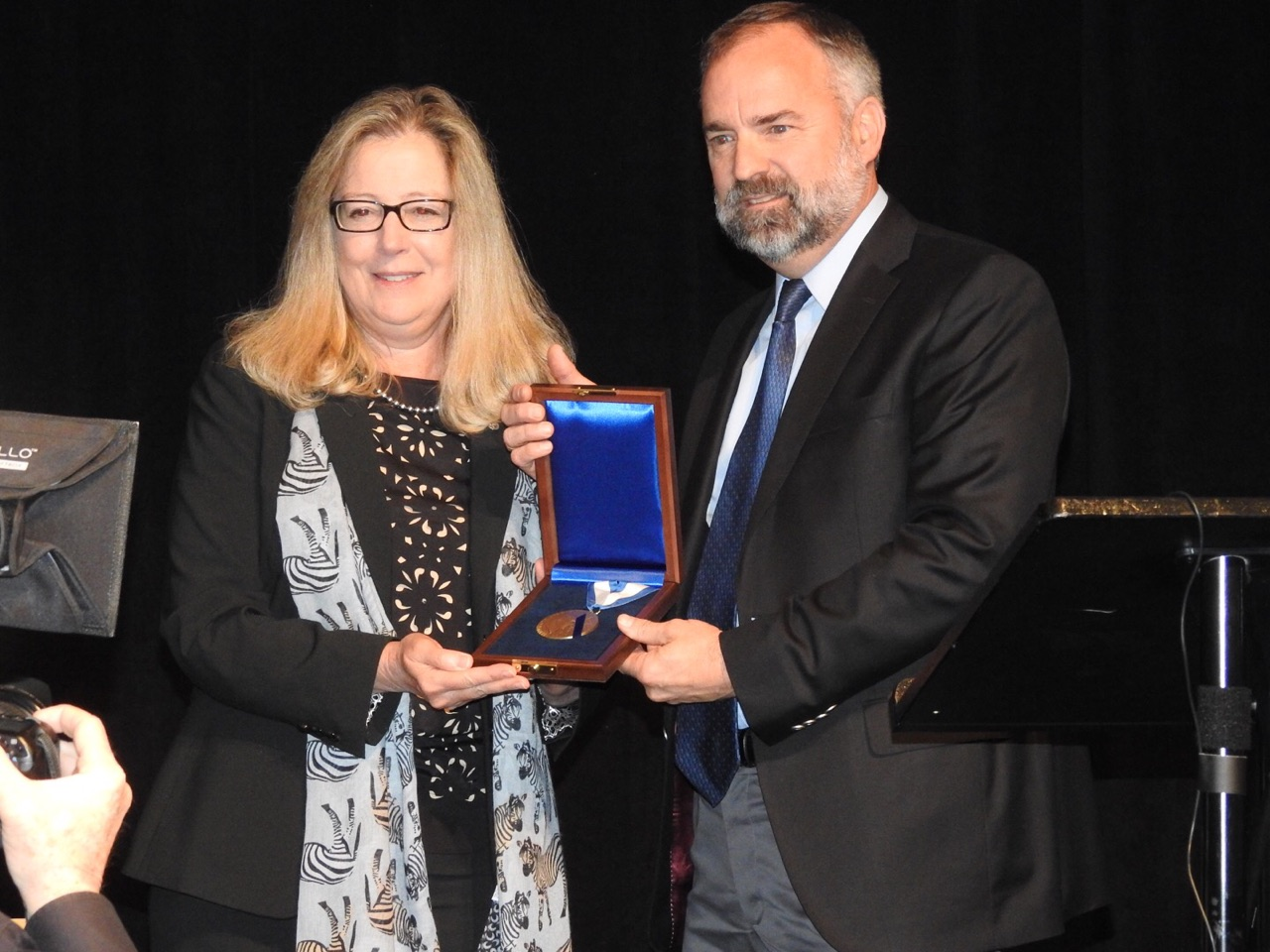
Dr. Gary Patton receiving the 2017 Frederick Philips Award from 2017 IEEE President Karen Bartleson.

Dr. Patton was elected a Fellow of the Institute of Electrical and Electronics Engineers (IEEE) in 2010 for his contribution to silicon germanium heterojunction bipolar transistors. Dr. Patton's pioneering work on SiGe HBTs was recognized at the 2004 International Electron Device Meetings 50th Anniversary event as the key innovation of 1987. He received an Outstanding Technology Achievement Award from IBM in 1989 for this work.

During his career at IBM, he received Outstanding Technical Achievement, Research Division, Microelectronics Division, and General Manager's Excellence Awards for his work.

In 2016, he was inducted into VLSI Research's Chip Making Industry Hall of Fame for decades of technology vision and leadership at IBM and now GlobalFoundries.

In 2017, Dr. Patton received the IEEE Frederik Philips Award, for outstanding accomplishments in the management of research and development resulting in effective innovation in the electrical and electronics industry.
