= Richard Beardsell =

British athletics competitor

Medal record

Athletics

Representing Great Britain

World Masters Athletics Championships (M35)
Gold medal – first place	2014 Budapest	400 m
Bronze medal – third place	2014 Budapest	200 m
Gold medal – first place	2015 Lyon	200 m
Gold medal – first place	2015 Lyon	400 m
Gold medal – first place	2016 Perth	200 m
Gold medal – first place	2016 Perth	400 m
Gold medal – first place	2016 Perth	4x100 m
Gold medal – first place	2016 Perth	4x400 m

European Masters Indoor Athletics Championships (M35)
Gold medal – first place	2015 Torun	400m
Gold medal – first place	2016 Ancona	400m
Silver medal – second place	2016 Ancona	200m

Richard Beardsell (born 19 January 1979) is an entrepreneur and former track and field sprint athlete who competed as a Masters athlete for Great Britain.

== Personal Bests ==
Event	Personal Best
60m	6.96i
100m	10.67
200m	21.47
400m	47.52
800m	1:54.44i

== Fraud conviction ==
In July 2025, Beardsell was sentenced to 18 months in prison, suspended for two years, for fraudulently obtaining two Bounce Back Loans intended for COVID recovery for his company Sports Creative Limited, which he transferred to his personal account and bank accounts of his wife and other family members, using most of the funds to purchase a £1.3 million pound home in Prestbury, Cheshire. Beardsell, also broke the rules by inflating his company’s turnover and securing two loans, when businesses should have only received one loan. Sports Creative eventually went into liquidation, although Beardsell's other company ShakeSphere, which he had funded using an appearance on the TV show Dragon's Den, was still running successfully.
