= Adrian Olszewski =

Polish footballer

Personal information
- Date of birth: 28 June 1993 (age 33)
- Place of birth: Pabianice, Poland
- Height: 1.99 m (6 ft 6 in)
- Position: Goalkeeper

Team information
- Current team: Polonia Lidzbark Warmiński

Youth career
- 2001–2009: Włókniarz Pabianice
- 2010–2011: ŁKS Łódź

Senior career*
Years	Team	Apps	(Gls)
2009–2010	Włókniarz Pabianice		
2011–2012	ŁKS Łódź	1	(0)
2013	Bałtyk Koszalin	4	(0)
2013–2014	Pelikan Łowicz	28	(0)
2014–2015	Bruk-Bet Termalica Nieciecza	0	(0)
2016	Polonia Bytom	14	(0)
2017	Lechia Tomaszów Mazowiecki	1	(0)
2017	Blomberger SV	7	(0)
2018	KSZO Ostrowiec Świętokrzyski	16	(0)
2018–2020	Motor Lublin	43	(0)
2020–2021	Bytovia Bytów	14	(0)
2021–2023	Olimpia Grudziądz	79	(0)
2024–2026	ŁKS Łomża	69	(0)
2026–	Polonia Lidzbark Warmiński	0	(0)
- * Club domestic league appearances and goals as of 23:50, 3 June 2026 (UTC)

Adrian Olszewski (born 28 June 1993) is a Polish professional footballer who plays as a goalkeeper for III liga club Polonia Lidzbark Warmiński.

== Club career ==
Olszewski started his career, playing at youth levels for his hometown club Włókniarz Pabianice. He made his senior team debut as a teenager in 2009. In the 2010–11 season, he played youth football with ŁKS Łódź. He was promoted to the first team in 2011, and made his Ekstraklasa debut at the age of 18 on 6 May 2012 in a 1–2 away loss to Jagiellonia Białystok.

In March 2013, Olszewski signed a contract with IV liga club Bałtyk Koszalin. After helping the club gain promotion to the III liga, in July 2013, he moved to II liga side Pelikan Łowicz. In July 2014, Olszewski joined I liga club Bruk-Bet Termalica Nieciecza as a reserve goalkeeper. He later played for Polonia Bytom, Lechia Tomaszów Mazowiecki, Blomberger SV, and KSZO Ostrowiec Świętokrzyski.

On 21 July 2018, he signed a contract with Motor Lublin. In August 2020, he was announced as the Bytovia Bytów player. He made his debut in the Bytovia's 2–2 draw against Śląsk Wrocław's reserve team.

== Honours ==
Bałtyk Koszalin

- IV liga West Pomerania: 2012–13

Motor Lublin

- III liga, group IV: 2019–20
- Polish Cup (Lublin subdistrict regionals): 2018–19, 2019–20

Olimpia Grudziądz

- III liga, group II: 2022–23

ŁKS Łomża

- Polish Cup (Podlasie regionals): 2024–25
