= Tamunonengiye-Ofori Ossai =

British sprinter

Medal record

Men's athletics

Representing Great Britain

World Masters Athletics Championships
Silver medal – second place	2013 Porto Alegre	100 m M35
Gold medal – first place	2015 Lyon	100 m M40
Gold medal – first place	2015 Lyon	200 m M40

European Masters Indoor Athletics Championships
Gold medal – first place	2015 Torun	200m M35
Silver medal – second place	2015 Torun	60m M35
Gold medal – first place	2016 Ancona	60m M40
Silver medal – second place	2016 Ancona	200m M40

Tamunonengiye-Ofori (Nengi) Ossai (born 13 July 1975) is a track and field sprint athlete who competes as a Masters athlete for Great Britain. He was a double gold medallist at the 2015 World Masters Athletics Championships, winning both the 100 metres and 200 metres in the men's under-40 category.

== Statistics ==
=== Personal bests ===
Event	Mark	Competition	Venue	Date
60m	6.97i	European Masters Indoor Championships	Torun, Poland	March 5, 2015
100m	10.79	Jo Smith Cup	Hendon, Great Britain	August 8, 2009
200m	21.75	World Masters Athletics Championships	Lyon, France	August 10, 2015
400m	49.67	South of England Athletics Championships	Crystal Palace, Great Britain	June 16, 2007

=== 100 meters progression ===
Year	Performance	Venue	Date	British ranking
2005	11.1	Woodford Green, Great Britain	August 6, 2005	265
2006	10.82	Loughborough, Great Britain	July 26, 2006	72
2007	10.99	Watford, Great Britain	August 8, 2007	126
2008	11.10	Bedford, Great Britain	September 6, 2008	266
2009	10.79	Hendon, Great Britain	August 8, 2009	72
2010	10.89	Birmingham, Great Britain	July 24, 2010	110
2011	11.00	Lee Valley, Great Britain	August 3, 2011	213
2012	10.7	Carshalton, Great Britain	June 30, 2012	162
2013	10.91	Porto Alegre, Brazil	October 19, 2013	165
2014	10.98	Newham, Great Britain	August 17, 2014	225
2015	10.98	Lyon, France	August 7, 2015	212

=== 200 meters progression ===
Year	Performance	Venue	Date	British ranking
2005	22.3	Woodford Green, Great Britain	August 6, 2005	183
2006	22.04	Tooting Bec, Great Britain	August 26, 2006	95
2007	22.30	Loughborough, Great Britain	August 11, 2007	172
2008	21.93	Birmingham, Great Britain	February 17, 2008	88
2009	22.05	Watford, Great Britain	September 9, 2009	114
2010	22.05	Birmingham, Great Britain	July 24, 2010	125
2011	22.1	Twickenham, Great Britain	September 18, 2011	181
2012	21.9	Carshalton, Great Britain	June 30, 2012	131
2013	22.02	Crawley, Great Britain	August 26, 2013	161
2014	22.50	Mile End, Great Britain	August 4, 2014	359
2015	21.75	Lyon, France	August 10, 2015	102
2016	22.36	Ancona, Italy	April 1, 2016	66
