= David Sweeney =

Canadian sailor (1960–2021)

Personal information
- Nationality: Canadian
- Born: 25 May 1960 Boston, Massachusetts, U.S.
- Died: 16 September 2021 (aged 61) Atlanta, Georgia, U.S.

Sport
- Sport: Sailing

David Ross Sweeney (25 May 1960 – 16 September 2021) was a Canadian sailor. He competed at the 1984 Summer Olympics, the 1988 Summer Olympics, and the 1992 Summer Olympics.
