= List of United States records in masters athletics =

These are the current records in the various age groups of masters athletics for United States competitors. Starting at age 35, each age group starts on the athlete's birthday in years that are evenly divisible by 5 and extends until the next such occurrence. For record purposes, older athletes are not included in younger age groups, except in the case of relay team members. A relay team's age group is determined by the age of the youngest member. There are two categories of relay records, one for composite teams made up of four American runners usually National teams at major championships, and a Club record for members of the same club, from the same Association.

Some masters events (hurdles, throwing implements) have modified specifications. The combined events use an age-graded result applied against the standard scoring table.

Based on IAAF rule 260.18a, since 2000, indoor marks superior to the outdoor record are eligible for record purposes. They are noted with an "i"

== Men ==
Key: Awaiting ratification Club record Not ratified or later rescinded by USATF

=== Men's 100 meters ===
Age group	Record	Athlete	Birthdate	Age	Place	Date	Meet	Ref.	Video
35-39	9.87 (−0.1 m/s)	Justin Gatlin	1982-Feb-10	37 years, 140 days	Palo Alto	2019-Jun-30	Prefontaine Classic		
40-44	10.67 (+1.1 m/s)	Rondrick Parker	1983-Jan-4	42 years, 168 days	Jacksonville	2025-Jun-21	JAC Golden Southeast Classic	*	
40-44	10.50 (+0.6 m/s)	Jeff Laynes	1970-Oct-03	40 years, 195 days	Davis	2011-Apr-16	Woody Wilson Invitational	*	
40-44	10.57 (+0.7 m/s)	Christopher Williams	1972-Mar-15	40 years, 93 days	Pasadena	2012-Jun-16	USATF Southern California Masters Championships		
45-49	10.72 (+1.0 m/s)	Willie Gault	1960-Sep-05	45 years, 292 days	Indianapolis	2006-Jun-24	USA Championships		
50-54	10.88 (+1.8 m/s)	Willie Gault	1960-Sep-05	50	Eagle Rock, California	2011-May-07	Occidental Invitational		
55-59	11.30 (+0.0 m/s)	Willie Gault	1960-Sep-05	55	Eagle Rock, California	2016-May-07	Occidental Invitational		
60-64	11.83 (+0.6 m/s)	Bill Collins	1950-Nov-20	61	Lisle, Illinois	2012-Aug-04	USATF National Masters Championships		
65-69	12.31 (+1.3 m/s)	Damien Leake	1952-Aug-12	65	Grass Valley, California	2018-Jun-16	Sierra Gold Masters Track and Field Festival		
70-74	12.59 (+0.2 m/s)	Damien Leake	1952-Aug-12	70	Westwood	2023-May-26	L.A. Grand Prix		
75-79	13.25 (+0.8 m/s)	Kenton Brown	1944-Sep-03	76	Marble Falls, Texas	2020-Oct-3			
80-84	14.21 (−0.7 m/s)	Kenton Brown	1944-Sep-03	80	Las Vegas	2024-Oct-04	NV Senior Games		
85-89	15.93 (+1.5 m/s)	Robert Whilden Jr.	1935-May-20	88	Greensboro	2023-Aug-07	USATF Masters Championships		
90-94	17.83 A	Donald Pellmann	1915-Aug-15	90	Fort Collins	2005-Sep-04	Rocky Mountain Masters	*	
95-99	24.14 NWI	Donald Pellmann	1915-Aug-15	95	Palo Alto	2011-Mar-27	Bay Area Senior Games		
100-104	26.99 (+1.1 m/s)	Donald Pellmann	1915-Aug-15	100	San Diego	2015-Sep-20	Senior Olympics		

=== Men's 200 meters ===
Age group	Record	Athlete	Birthdate	Age	Place	Date	Meet	Ref.
35-39	20.49 (+0.4 m/s)	Justin Gatlin	10 February 1982	39 years, 107 days	Doha, United Arab Emirates	28 May 2021	Doha Diamond League	
35-39	20.31 (+0.1 m/s)	Floyd Heard	1966-Mar-24	35	Walnut, California	2002-Apr-21	Mt. SAC Relays	
40-44	21.86	Bill Collins	1950-Nov-20	41	Spokane, Washington	1992-Aug-15	USATF National Masters Championships	*
40-44	21.80 (+1.4 m/s)	Willie Gault	1960-Sep-05	44	Culver City, California	2005-Jun-11	USATF Southern California Masters Age-Group Championships	
45-49	21.80 (+0.6 m/s)	Willie Gault	1960-Sep-05	47	Los Angeles	2008-Apr-26	Tiny Lister Invitational	
50-54	22.44 (+1.2 m/s)	Willie Gault	1960-Sep-05	50	Eagle Rock, California	2011-May-07	Occidental Invitational	
55-59	23.24 (+1.0 m/s)	Willie Gault	1960-Sep-05	55	Eagle Rock	2016-May-07	Occidental Invitational	
55-59	23.21 NWI	Craig Wood			Eugene	2025-Jul-31	USA Championships	
60-64	24.14 (+0.3 m/s)	Oscar Peyton	1952-Nov-12	62	Raleigh, North Carolina	2015-Jun-20	USATF Southeast Region Championships	
65-69	24.65 (−0.7 m/s)	Charles Allie	1947-Aug-20	66	Berea, Ohio	2013-Jul-26	National Senior Games	
70-74	25.75 (+1.7 m/s)	Charles Allie	1947-Aug-20	70	Des Moines, Iowa	2018-Jun-21	USA Championships	
75-79	27.73 (−0.1 m/s)	Bob Lida	1936-Nov-11	75	Lisle, Illinois	2012-Aug-05	USATF National Masters Championships	
80-84	29.49 (+0.3 m/s)	Kenton Brown	1944-Sep-03	81	St. George, United States	2025-Oct-7	Huntsman World Senior Games	
85-89	34.41 (−1.8 m/s)	Roderick Parker	1919-May-17	85	Decatur, Illinois	2004-Aug-07	USATF Masters Championships	
90-94	41.20	John Means	1919-Apr-01	90	Geneva, Ohio	2010-Jul-17	USATF Lake Erie Association Championships	
95-99	57.91 (+0.3 m/s)	William Platts	1928-Feb-23	96	Sacramento, United States	2024-Jul-18	USATF Masters Outdoor Championships	
100-104	2:02.37 (+0.2 m/s)	Orville Rogers	1917-Nov-28	100	Spokane, Washington	2018-Jul-29	USATF National Masters Championships	

=== Men's 400 meters ===
Age group	Record	Athlete	Birthdate	Age	Place	Date	Meet	Ref.
35-39	46.38	James King	1949-May-09	35	San Diego	1984-May-25		
40-44	48.44	James King	1949-May-09	40	Eugene, Oregon	1989-Aug-05	WAVA Championships	
45-49	49.09	Allen Woodard	1969-Jan-16	48	Houston, Texas	2017-Mar-18	Texas Southern University, TSU Relays	
50-54	51.13	Khalid Mulazim	1966-Mar-28	51	Baton Rouge, Louisiana	2017-Jul-14	USATF Masters Championships	
55-59	52.24	Charles Allie	1947-Aug-20	55	Carolina, Puerto Rico	2003-Jul-12	World Masters Athletics Championships	
60-64	54.29	Charles Allie	1947-Aug-20	61	Raleigh, North Carolina	2009-May-02	Southeastern Masters Meet	
65-69	56.09	Charles Allie	1947-Aug-20	65	Raleigh, North Carolina	2013-May-18	USATF Southeast Region Championships	
70-74	57.26	Charles Allie	1947-Aug-20	71	Málaga, Spain	2018-Sep-11	World Masters Athletics Championships	
75-79	1:04.45	Bob Lida	1936-Nov-11	76	Berea, Ohio	2013-Jul-26	National Senior Games	
80-84	1:12.10	Bob Lida	1936-Nov-11	80	Toronto, Canada	2017-Aug-12	NCC Masters Championships	
85-89	1:24.18	Roderick Parker	1918-Nov-09	85	Decatur, Illinois	2004-Aug-06	USATF Masters Championships	
90-94	1:39.39	Bob Matteson	1916-Jun-25	90	Charlotte, North Carolina	2006-Aug-05	USATF Masters Championships	
95-99	2:21.82	Orville Rogers	1917-Nov-28	95	Olathe, Kansas	2013-Jul-12	USATF National Masters Championships	
100-104	5:07.26	Orville Rogers	1917-Nov-28	100	Spokane, Washington	2018-Jul-27	USATF National Masters Championships	

=== Men's 800 meters ===
Age group	Record	Athlete	Birthdate	Age	Place	Date	Meet	Ref.
35-39	1:43.36	Johnny Gray	1960-Jun-19	35	Zürich, Switzerland	1995-Aug-16	Weltklasse Zürich	
40-44	1:50.34	Jim Sorensen	1967-May-10	40	Bloomington, Indiana	2007-Jun-30	American Milers Club	
40-44	1:48.81 i	Johnny Gray	1960-Jun-19	40	Atlanta	2001-Mar-02	USA Championships	
45-49	1:54.18	Sal Allah	1960-Jan-01	45	Pomona, New Jersey	2005-Jul-02	USATF East Region Championships	
50-54	1:58.65	Nolan Shaheed	1949-Jul-18	50	Eagle Rock, California	2000-May-13	Jim Bush USATF Southern California Championships	
55-59	2:03.75	Anselm LeBourne	1959-Apr-20	56	Beijing, China	2015-Aug-29	World Championships	
60-64	2:08.56	Nolan Shaheed	1949-Jul-18	61	Los Angeles	2011-Apr-23	Tiny Lister Invitational	
65-69	2:17.20	Frank Condon	1942-Jul-13	65	Orono, Maine	2007-Aug-04	USATF Masters Championships	
70-74	2:26.14	Charles Rose	1933-Mar-06	70	Eugene, Oregon	2003-Aug-08	USATF Masters Championships	
75-79	2:40.0 h	Harold Chapson	1902-Jul-11	75	Eugene, Oregon	1978-May-14		
80-84	2:53.5 h	Harold Chapson	1902-Jul-11	80	Honolulu, Hawaii	1982-Jul-11		
80-84	2:49.4 h	Harold Chapson	1902-Jul-11	81	Honolulu, Hawaii	1983-Aug-09		
85-89	3:28.15	Alfred Funk	1914-Jun-24	86	Eugene, Oregon	2000-Aug-12	USATF Masters Championships	
90-94	4:39.59	Paul Spangler	1899-Mar-18	90	Los Gatos, California,	1989-Jun-10		
95-99	5:58.15	Roy Englert	1922-Sep-11	95	Spokane	2018-Jul-26	USATF Masters Championships	

=== Men's 1,500 meters ===
Age group	Record	Athlete	Birthdate	Age	Place	Date	Meet	Ref.
35-39	3:32.51	Bernard Lagat	1974-Dec-12	35	Monaco	2010-Jul-22	Herculis	
40-44	3:41.87	Bernard Lagat	1974-Dec-12	40	Birmingham, Great Britain	2015-Jun-07	Sainsbury's Birmingham Grand Prix	
45-49	3:55.09	Christian Cushing-murray	1967-Oct-18	45	Eagle Rock, Los Angeles	2013-Mar-15	Oxy Distance Classic	
50-54
50-54	4:01.77	Brad Wilson Barton	1966-April-3	50	Eugene, Oregon	2016-Jul-03	U.S. Olympic Trials	
55-59	4:17.80	Richard Burns	1955-Jan-21	55	Eagle Rock, Los Angeles	2010-Mar-12	Oxy Distance Carnival	
60-64	4:24.00	Nolan Shaheed	1949-Jul-18	61	Norwalk, California	2011-April-30	Southern California Striders Meet of Champions	
65-69	4:46.05	Gary Patton	1945-Dec-12	65	Sacramento, California	2011-Jul-15	World Masters Athletics Championships	
70-74	5:04.87	Gary Patton	1945-Dec-12	70	Perth, Australia	2016-Nov-05	World Masters Athletics Championships	
75-79	5:28.5 h	Scotty Carter	1916-Nov-14	75	Providence	1992-Jun-28		
80-84	6:04.28	Ed Benham	1907-Jul-12	80	Melbourne, Australia	1987-Dec-05	WAVA Championships	
80-84	5:54.5 h	Harold Chapson	1902-Jul-11	80	Honolulu, Hawaii	1982-Jul-17		
85-89	7:19.51	Ino Cantù		85	Lockhart, Texas	2019-Jun-29	USATF Southwest Regional Championships	
90-94	9:25.2 h	Paul Spangler	1899-Mar-18	90	Los Gatos, California	1989-Jun-10		
95-99	12:16.93	Roy Englert	1922-Sep-11	95	Spokane, Washington	2018-Jul-29	USATF Masters Championships	

=== Men's Mile ===
Age group	Record	Athlete	Birthdate	Age	Place	Date	Meet	Ref.	Video
35-39	3:51.38	Bernard Lagat	1974-Dec-12	36	London, England	2011-Aug-06	London Grand Prix		
40-44	3:57.91	Bernard Lagat	1974-Dec-12	40	London, England	2015-Jul 25	London Grand Prix		
45-49	4:12.33	John Trautmann	1968-June-29	46	Boston	2015-February-14	David Hemery Valentine Invitational		
50-54	4:19.59	Brad Barton	1966-Apr-03	53	Nashville, Tennessee	2019-May-31	Music City Distance Carnival		V
55-59	4:36.94	Richard Burns	1955-Jan-21	55	Portland, Oregon	2010-Jun-12	Portland Track Festival		
60-64	4:53.01	Nolan Shaheed	1949-Jul-18	60	Portland, Oregon	2012-Jun-09	Portland Track Festival		
65-69	5:11.74	Tom Bernhard	1951-Jul-09	65	Cox Stadium, San Francisco	2016-Jul-23	Pride Meet		
70-74	5:35.03	Gary Patton	1945-Dec-12	70	Cerritos College, Norwalk, California	2016-Jun-18	USATF West Region Championships		
75-79	5:57.2	Scotty Carter	1916-Nov-14	75	Dedham, Massachusetts	1992-Jul-12			
80-84	7:09.60	Joseph King	1926-May-09	82	Eugene, Oregon	2008-Aug-02	Hayward Track Classic		
85-89	8:13.49	Gunnar Linde	1928-Jul-14	85	Santa Ana, California	2014-Feb-16	Southern California Indoor Meet . . . Outdoors		
90-94	10:52.98	Bill Lauderback		91	Eugene, Oregon	2008-Aug-02	Hayward Track Classic		
90-94	9:42.99	Gunnar Linde	1928-Jul-14	90	Santa Ana, California	2019-Feb-17	Southern California Indoor Meet . . . Outdoors		
95-99	14:48.2	Herb Kirk	1895-Oct-02	95	Bozeman, Montana	1990-Oct-06			

=== Men's 3,000 meters ===
Age group	Record	Athlete	Birthdate	Age	Place	Date	Meet	Ref.	Video
35-39	7:29.00	Bernard Lagat	1974-Dec-12	35	Rieti, Italy	2010-Aug-29	Rieti Meeting		
40-44	7:42.75	Bernard Lagat	1974-Dec-12	40	Lucerne, Switzerland	2015-Jul-14			
45-49	8:36.86	Peter Magil	1961-Jun-19	46	Los Angeles	2008-Mar-01	Trojan Relays		
45-49	8:26.15 i	Brad Barton	1966-April-3	47	New York City	2014-Mar-08	Columbia Columbia Last Chance Qualifier		
50-54	8:49.66	Sean Wade	1966-Feb-2	50	Houston, Texas	2016-Apr-16			
55-59	9:16.62	Nat Larson	1962-Jun-15	56	Waltham, Massachusetts	2018-Jun-3			
60-64	9:58.77+	Daniel King		60	Columbia, South Carolina	2020-Dec-11	Five and Dime		
65-69	10:49.81	Paul Heitzman	1931-Feb-25	67	Eugene, Oregon	1998-Jun-28			
70-74	11:19.29	Gary Patton	1945-Dec-12	71	Eugene, Oregon	2017-Apr-30			
75-79	12:04.0	Scotty Carter	1916-Nov-14	75	Providence	1992-Jun-28			
80-84	13:40.42	Sherwood Sagedahl		80	St. Louis Park, Minnesota	2019-June-25	Association Series		
80-84	13:09.48	Ed Benham	1907-Jul-12	81	Raleigh, North Carolina	1989-May-01			
85-89	16:32.0	Paul Spangler	1899-Mar-18	85	Raleigh, North Carolina	1984-May-04			
90-94	20:08.4	Paul Spangler	1899-Mar-18	90	Berkeley	1989-Sep-16			

=== Men's 5,000 meters ===
Age group	Record	Athlete	Birthdate	Age	Place	Date	Meet	Ref.
35-39	12:53.60	Bernard Lagat	1974-Dec-12	36	Monaco	2011-Jul-22	Herculis	
40-44	13:06.78	Bernard Lagat	1974-Dec-12	41	Rio de Janeiro, Brazil	2016-Aug-20	Olympic Games	
45-49	14:34.27	Peter Magill	1961-Jun-19	46	Walnut, California	2008-Mar-08		
50-54	14:52.92	Sean Wade	1966-Feb-2	50	Houston, Texas	2016-Mar-25		
55-59	15:42.13	Peter Magill	1961-Jun-19	55	Fullerton, California	2017-Mar-10		
60-64	16:33.50	Nathanael Larson	1962-Jun-15	60	Waltham, Massachusetts	2022-Jun-18		
65-69	17:44.03	Tom Bernhard	1951-July-09	65	Grand Rapids, Michigan	2016-July-14	USATF Masters Championships	
65-69	17:40.4 h	Clive Davies	1915-Aug-17	66	Gresham, Oregon	1982-Jul-31		
70-74	18:43.61	Warren Utes	1920-Jun-25	71	Turku, Finland	1991-Jul-23	WAVA Championships	
75-79
75-79	20:28.41	John Keston	1924-Dec-12	78	Gresham, Oregon	2003-Jul-12	Oregon State Games	
75-79	20:36.80	John Keston	1924-Dec-12	77	Seattle, Washington	2002-Jul-27		
80-84
80-84	21:46.86	Ed Benham	1907-Jul-12	81	St. Louis, Missouri	1989-Jun-22	Senior Olympics	
80-84	21:57.88	Ed Benham	1907-Jul-12	81	Orlando, Florida	1988-Aug-06	USATF Masters Championships	
85-89	25:47.54	Alfred Funk	1914-Jun-24	86	Eugene, Oregon	2000-Aug-10	USATF Masters Championships	
90-94	36:13.57	Roy Englert	1922-Sep-11	91	Winston-Salem, North Carolina	2014-Jul-20	USATF Masters Championships	
95-99	42:30.23	Roy Englert	1922-Sep-11	96	Ames, Iowa	2019-Jul-11	USATF Masters Championships	

=== Men's 10,000 meters ===
Age group	Record	Athlete	Birthdate	Age	Place	Date	Meet	Ref.
35-39	27:58.88	Ben True	1985-Dec-29	35	Eugene, Oregon	2021-Jun-18		
35-39	27:14.95	Ben True	1985-Dec-29	35	San Juan Capistrano, United States	2021-Feb-20	The Ten	
40-44
40-44	27:49.35	Bernard Lagat	1974-Dec-12	41	Stanford, California	2016-May-01	Payton Jordan Invitational	
40-44	28:57.88	Kevin Castille	1972-Mar-17	40	Stanford, California	2012-Apr-06		
45-49	29:44.38	Kevin Castille	1972-Mar-17	45	LaFayette, Louisiana	2017-Mar-17		
50-54	30:48.87	Sean Wade	1966-Feb-2	50	San Francisco, California	2016-Apr-01		
55-59	33:00.66	Norman Green	1932-Jun-27	57	Eugene, Oregon	1989-Jul-29	WAVA Championships	
60-64	35:19.8	Clive Davies	1915-Aug-17	63	Eugene, Oregon	1978-Aug-19		
65-69
65-69	37:52.75	John Keston	1924-Dec-05	68	Eugene, Oregon	1993-Jul-17		
65-69	38:34.45	Tom Bernhard	1951-Jul-09	65	San Mateo, California	2017-Jun-04		
70-74	38:23.69	Warren Utes	1920-Jun-25	71	Turku, Finland	1991-Jul-20	WAVA Championships	
75-79
75-79	41:59.06	John Keston	1924-Dec-05	76	Eugene, Oregon	2001-Jun-09	Hayward Track Classic	
75-79	43:39.4	John Keston	1924-Dec-05	77	Eugene, Oregon	2002-Jun-29		
80-84	44:29.26	Ed Benham	1907-Jul-12	81	Orlando, Florida	1988-Aug-04	USATF Masters Championships	
85-89	54:19.28	Alfred Funk	1914-Jun-24	86	Eugene, Oregon	2000-Aug-12	USATF Masters Championships	
90-94	1:11:40.78	Paul Spangler	1899-Mar-18	90	Eugene, Oregon	1989-Jul-29	WAVA Championships	

=== Men's marathon ===
Age group	Record	Athlete	Birthdate	Age	Place	Date	Meet	Ref.
40-44	2:10:02	Elkanah Kibet	1983-Jun-2	40	Orlando, Florida	2024-Feb-03	U.S. Olympic Trials	
40-44	2:06:55	Galen Rupp	1986-May-8	40	Chicago, Illinois	2026-Oct-11	Chicago Marathon	
45-49	2:14:23	Bernard Lagat		45	Atlanta, Georgia	2020-Feb-29	U.S. Olympic Trials	
50-54	2:24:08	Mbarak Hussein		50	Minneapolis, MN	2015-Oct-04	Twin Cities Marathon	
55-59	2:33:49	Norman Green		55	Lincoln, NE	1988-May-01	Lincoln Marathon	
60-64	2:42:42	Brian Pilcher		60	Chicago, IL	2016-Oct-09	Chicago Marathon	
65-69	2:42:49	Clive Davies		66	Eugene, OR	1989-Sep-18	Nike OTC Marathon	
70-74	2:55:22	Gene Dykes		70	Toronto, Canada	2018-Oct-21	Toronto Marathon	
75-79	3:17:01	Gene Dykes		75	Chicago, IL	2023-Oct-08	Chicago Marathon	
80-84	3:59:05	Jerry Johncock		80	Minneapolis, MN	2008-Oct-05	Twin Cities Marathon	
90-94	6:46:34	Ernest Van Leeuwen		92	Los Angeles, CA	2005-Mar-06	Los Angeles Marathon	

=== Men's 80 meters hurdles ===
Age group	Record	Athlete	Birthdate	Age	Place	Date	Meet	Ref.
70-74 (30")	12.61 (−1.9 m/s)	Ty Brown	1945-Feb-09	70	Jacksonville, Florida	2015-Jul-24	USATF Masters Championships	
75-79 (30")	13.62	James Stookey	1930-Jan-20	75	McLean, Virginia	2005-Sep-04	Potomac Valley Games	
80-84 (27")	14.75 (+0.1 m/s)	Melvin Larsen	1924-Jun-12	80	San Sebastián, Spain	2005-Aug-31	World Masters Championships	
85-89 (27")
85-89 (27")	19.46	Albert Morrow	1912-Nov-02	85	Long Beach, California	1998-May-09	Southern California Striders Meet of Champions	
85-89 (27")	20.00 (−3.2 m/s)	Ralph Maxwell	1919-Nov-11	87	Orono, Maine	2007-Aug-03	USATF Masters Championships	
90-94 (27")	21.62 (−1.5 m/s)	Ralph Maxwell	1919-Nov-11	91	Sacramento, California	2011-Jul-07	World Masters Championships	

=== Men's 100 meters hurdles ===
Age group	Record	Athlete	Birthdate	Age	Place	Date	Meet	Ref.	Video
50-54 (36")	13.57	Walt Butler	1941-Mar-21	50	Naperville, Illinois	1991-Jul-05	USATF Masters Championships		
55-59 (36")	14.49 (+1.6 m/s)	Walt Butler	1941-Mar-21	55	Eugene, Oregon	1996-Aug-22			
55-59 (36")	14.44	Walt Butler	1941-Mar-21	55	Los Angeles, California	1996-Jun-30			
60-64 (33")	14.37 (+0.4 m/s)	Thaddeus Wilson	1950-Dec-22	60	Berea, Ohio	2011-Jul-29	USATF Masters Championships		
65-69 (33")	15.20 (NWI)	Ty Brown	1945-Feb-09	68	Raleigh, North Carolina	2013-May-18	USATF Southeast Region Championships		

=== Men's 110 meters hurdles ===
Age group	Record	Athlete	Birthdate	Age	Place	Date	Meet	Ref.	Video
M 35 (42")	12.96 (42") (+0.4 m/s)	Allen Johnson	1971-Mar-01	35	Athens, Greece	2006-17-Sep	IAAF World Cup		
40-44 (39")	13.73 (−0.5 m/s)	David Ashford	1964-Jan-24	40	Carolina, Puerto Rico	2003-Jul-11	World Masters Athletics Championships		
45-49 (39")	14.46 (−0.7 m/s)	Derek Pye	1968-Jan-27	47	Jacksonville, United States	2015-Jul-24	USATF Masters Championships		
45-49 (39")	14.41 (−1.3 m/s)	Willie Gault	1960-Sep-05	45	Eagle Rock, United States	2006-May-13			

=== Men's 200 meters hurdles ===
Age group	Record	Athlete	Birthdate	Age	Place	Date	Meet	Ref.
80-84 (27")	37.15 (+1.7 m/s)	Robert Hewitt	1930-Mar-30	80	Jacksonville, Florida	2015-Jul-24	USATF Masters Championships	
90-94 (27")	51.31	Ralph Maxwell	1919-Nov-11	90	Ft. Collins, Colorado	2010-Aug-29	Rocky Mountain Masters	

=== Men's 300 meters hurdles ===
Age group	Record	Athlete	Birthdate	Age	Place	Date	Meet	Ref.
60-64 (30")	43.49	Jack Greenwood	1926-Feb-05	63	Eugene, Oregon	1989-Aug-03	WAVA Championships	
65-69 (30")	45.20	Jack Greenwood	1926-Feb-05	65	Turku, Finland	1991-Jul-25	WAVA Championships	
70-74 (30")	50.22	James Stookey	1930-Jan-20	70	San Diego, California	2000-Sep-17		
75-79 (30")	53.15	James Stookey	1930-Jan-20	75	Honolulu, Hawaii	2005-Aug-05	USATF Masters Championships	
80-84 (30")	59.67	Dan Bulkley	1917-May-04	81	Eugene, Oregon	1998-Aug-13		
80-84 (30")	1:02.61	Dan Bulkley	1917-May-04	82	Gateshead, United Kingdom	1999-Aug-01	WAVA Championships	
85-89 (27")
85-89 (27")	1:21.24	Ralph Maxwell	1919-Nov-11	88	Clermont, Florida	2008-Aug-27		
85-89 (27")	1:21.44	Ralph Maxwell	1919-Nov-11	88	Spokane, Washington	2008-Aug-10	USATF Masters Championships	

=== Men's 400 meters hurdles ===
Age group	Record	Athlete	Birthdate	Age	Place	Date	Meet	Ref.
35-39 (36")	48.93	Nat Page	1957-Jan-26	35	London, England	1992-Jul-10		
40-44 (36")	52.76	James King	1949-May-09	40	Eugene, Oregon	1989-Aug-03	WAVA Championships	
45-49 (36")	55.72	Darnell Gatling	1960-May-01	47	New York City	2007-Jul-13	USATF Club Championships	
45-49 (36")	55.63	Darnell Gatling	1960-May-01	47	Armonk, New York	2007-Jul-26	Empire State Games	
50-54 (33")	56.86	Darnell Gatling	1960-May-01	51	Sacramento, California	2011-Jul-11	World Masters Championships	
55-59 (33")	57.73	Getulio Echeandia	1964-May-15	55	Ames, Iowa	2019-Jul-14	USATF National Masters Championships	

=== Men's 2,000 meters steeplechase ===
Age group	Record	Athlete	Birthdate	Age	Place	Date	Meet	Ref.
60-64 (30")	7:09.91	Nolan Shaheed	1949-Jul-18	62	Pasadena, California	2012-Jun-16	USATF Southern California Masters Championships	
65-69 (30")	7:19.62	Nolan Shaheed	1949-Jul-18	65	Winston-Salem, North Carolina	2014-Jul-20	USATF Masters Championships	
70-74 (30")	8:39.25	Gunnar Linde	1928-July-14	71	Gateshead, United Kingdom	1999-Aug-08	WAVA Championships	
75-79 (30")	9:48.9	Gunnar Linde	1928-July-14	75	Sacramento, California	2003-Aug-02	Pan Pacific Masters Games	
80-84 (30")	11:06.76	Gunnar Linde	1928-July-14	83	Sacramento, California	2011-Jul-17	World Masters Championships	
85-89 (30")	12:55.75	Robert Culling	1932-Jan-12	85	Spokane, Washington	2018-July 27	USATF Masters Championships	
90-94 (30")	15:47.32	Gunnar Linde	1928-July-14	90	Toronto, Canada	2019-July-19	NCCWMA	

=== Men's 3,000 meters steeplechase ===
Age group	Record	Athlete	Birthdate	Age	Place	Date	Meet	Ref.	Video
35-39 (36")	8:30.45	Sandu Rebenciuc	1969-May-26	35	Sacramento, California	2004-Jul-12	U.S. Olympic Trials		
40-44 (36")	9:18.6 h	Hal Higdon	1931-June-17	44	Toronto, Canada	1975-Aug-15	WAVA Championships		
40-44 (36")	9:02.12	Max King	1980-February-24	44	Corvallis, United States	2024-Apr-26	Oregon State High Performance		
45-49 (36")	9:06.68	Brad Wilson Barton	1966-April-3	48	Nashville, United States	2014-Jun-28	Music City Distance Carnival		V
50-54 (36")	9:49.74	Brad Wilson Barton	1966-April-3	53	Portland, United States	2019-Jul-19	Stumptown Twilight		V
55-59 (36")	10:38.16	Dale Campbell	1953-Sep-14	57	Costa Mesa, United States	2011-Apr-08			

=== Men's 4 × 100 meters relay ===
Age group	Record	Athlete	Birthdate	Age	Place	Date	Meet	Ref.	Video
35+	41.30	United States; Rondrick Parker; Terrence Roland; Sean Burnett; Gerald Green Jr.	1983-Mar-28; 1982-Feb-17; 1981-Oct-19; 1981-Mar-25		Atlanta, Georgia	2019-May-26	Atlanta Georgia Relays		
35+ club	44.88	SW Sprinters TC: John Simpson; Marcus Shute; Chris Grant; Don Drummond	1966-Feb-24; 1962-Oct-03 1969-Jun-06		Spokane, Washington	2008-Aug-10	USATF Masters Championships		
40+	41.4 h	Speedwest TC: Aaron Thigpen; Kevin Morning; Kettrell Berry; Willie Gault	1964-Sep-18; 1956-Jun-28; 1962-Dec-27; 1960-Sep-05		Culver City, California	2005-Jun-11	USATF Southern California Masters Age-Group Championships		
40+ Club	42.20	Speedwest TC: Frank Strong; Cornell Stephenson; Kettrell Berry; Willie Gault	1962-Apr-19; 1962-Dec-08; 1962-Dec-27; 1960-Sep-05		Irvine, California	2004-May-02			
45+	43.75	U.S.A. Anthony Karnell Vickers; Allen Woodard; Jeffery Mack; Stevan Dixon	1967-Feb-25; 1969-Jan-16; 1972-May-12; 1970-Oct-15		Baton Rouge, Louisiana	2017-Jul-16	USATF Masters Championships		
45+ Club	47.24	Atlanta Track Club; Don Drummond; Michael Johnson; Calvin Padgett; Michael Carpenter	1969-Jun-06; 1966-Nov-02; 1968-Dec-16; 1967-Aug-18		Winston-Salem, North Carolina	2014-Jul-20	USATF Masters Championships		
50+	44.47	Central Park TC; Randy Frey; Ben James; Tony Fulton; Val Barnwell	1958-Oct-21; 1956-Sep-03; 1958-Nov-01; 1957-Sep-10		Philadelphia, Pennsylvania	2009-Apr-24	Penn Relays		
55+	46.32	U.S.A. Val Barnwell, Allan Tissenbaum, Robert Foster, Don McGee	1957-Sep-10; 1960-Apr-30; 1962-Feb-07; 1960-May-31		Toronto, Canada	2017-Aug-12			
55+ Club	46.68	SoCal TC: Robert Foster; Brian Hankerson; James Chinn; Val Barnwell	1962-Feb-07; 1959-Oct-04; 1958-Nov-26; 1957-Sep-10		Baton Rouge, Louisiana	2017-Jul-16	USATF Masters Championships		
60+	47.93	USA: Leo Sanders; Charles Allie; Thaddeus Wilson; Ralph Peterson	1951-Jan-26; 1947-Aug-20; 1950-Dec-22; 1949-Aug-22		Sacramento, California	2011-Jul-17	World Masters Athletics Championships		
60+ club	48.33	Houston Elite; Ron Johnson; Charles Allie; Richard Riddle; Bill Collins	1945-Oct-22; 1947-Aug-20; 1951-Aug-03; 1950-Nov-20		Philadelphia, Pennsylvania	2013-Apr-26	Penn Relays		
65+	50.63	U.S.A. Max Siu; Charles Allie; Glynn Osborne(67); Damien Leake	1952-12-04; 1947-Aug-20 1952-Aug-21		Spokane	2018-Jul-29	USATF Masters Championships		
70+	51.96	Sprint Force America: Gary Sims; Wayne Bennett; Richard Rizzo; Bob Lida	1937-Dec-09; 1936-Oct-11; 1937-Feb-16; 1936-Nov-11		Philadelphia, Pennsylvania	2008-Apr-25	Penn Relays		
75+	1:01.12	U.S.A. Emil Pawlik, Robert Cozens, Robert Lida, Bill Kaspari	1939-Jan-14; 1936-Jun-02; 1936-Nov-11; 1934-Sep-05		Lyon, France	2015-Aug-16	2015 World Masters Athletics Championships		
80+	1:06.12	USA : Melvin Larsen; William Daprano; Sam Hirabayashi; Bill Melville	1924-Jun-24; 1927-Feb-02; 1927-May-24; 1927-Jul-13		Riccione, Italy	2007-Sep-15	World Masters Athletics Championships		
80+ Club	1:20.63	Houston Elite; Joe Summerlin; William Kaspari; Wayne Bennett; Robert Lida	1931-Nov-07; 1934-Sep-05; 1936-Oct-11; 1936-Nov-11		Baton Rouge, Louisiana	2017-Jul-16	USATF Masters Championships		
85+	2:01.47	U.S.A. Lawrence Stotter; Alan Smith; Robert Culling; Dixon Hemphill	87 years 86 years 1932-Jan-12; 1925-Jan-10		Baton Rouge, Louisiana	2017-Jul-16	USATF Masters Championships		
90+	2:22.37	U.S.A. Charles Ross; Orville Rogers; Roy Englert; Champion Goldy Sr	1922-Dec-03; 1917-Nov-28; 1922-Sep-11; 1917-Jan-30		Winston-Salem, North Carolina	2014-Jul-20	USATF Masters Championships		

=== Men's 4 × 400 meters relay ===
Age group	Record	Athlete	Birthdate	Age	Place	Date	Meet	Ref.
35+ club	3:19.45	SW Sprinters TC: Leon Bullard; Blair DeSio; Edward Winslow; Antwon Dussett	1973-Aug-08; 1970-Oct-06; 1969-May-27; 1975-Oct-05		Winston-Salem, North Carolina	2014-Jul-20	USATF Masters Championships	
40+ Club	3:20.83	Sprint Force America: Sal Allah; Kevin Morning; Edward Gonera; Ray Blackwell	1960-Jan-01; 1956-Jun-28; 1952-May-15; 1958-May-15		Philadelphia, Pennsylvania	2001-Apr-28	Penn Relays	
45+	3:22.79	U.S.A. Karnell Vickers; Mark Gomes; Lee Bridges; Allen Woodard	1967-Feb-21; 1970-Nov-30; 1967-Mar-20; 1969-Jan-16		Philadelphia, Pennsylvania	2017-Apr-29	Penn Relays	
45+ Club	3:37.89	SW Sprinters; James Lawson; John Cormier; Marcus Shute; David Jones	1963-Nov-06; 1967-Aug-02; 1962-Oct-03; 1964-Oct-08		Jacksonville, Florida	2015-Jul-16	USATF Masters Championships	
50+	3:31.76	USA : Michael Sullivan; Corey Moody; Darnell Gatling; Ray Blackwell	1961-Feb-26; 1961-Apr-07; 1960-May-01; 1958-May-15		Sacramento, California	2011-Jul-17	World Masters Championships	
50+ Club	3:34.08	SW Sprinters TC: John Cormier; Marcus Shute; François Boda; Khalid Mulazim	1967-Mar-22; 1962-Oct-03; 1964-Jun-05; 1966-Mar-28		Baton Rouge, Louisiana	2017-Jul-16	USATF Masters Championships	
55+	3:40.62	U.S.A. Charles Allie; George Haywood; Bill Collins; Horace Grant	1947-Aug-20; 1953-Jan-15; 1950-Nov-20; 1947-Aug-20		Philadelphia, Pennsylvania	2010-Apr-23	Penn Relays	
55+ Club	4:24.34	So Cal TC: Basil Scott; Steve Brumwell; Brian Nelson; Robert Scott	1955-May-05; 1958-Mar-17; 1957-Jul-17; 1955-May-05		Jacksonville, Florida	2015-Jul-16	USATF Masters Championships	
60+ Club	3:51.33	Houston Elite: Bill Collins; Horace Grant; George Haywood; Charles Allie	1950-Nov-20; 1947-Aug-20; 1953-Jan-15; 1947-Aug-20		Philadelphia	2013-Apr-26	Penn Relays	
65+	4:04.78	U.S.A. David Ortman; Charles Allie; Howard Clark; George Haywood	1953-Mar-28; 1947-Aug-21; 1950-Dec-02; 1952-Sep-30		Málaga, Spain	2018-Sep-16	World Masters Championships	
65+ Club	5:46.65	TNT International: James Frontino; Ty Coleman; Jim Sharps; John Aiken	1949-Nov-28; 1947-Aug-06; 1945; 1949-Mar-23		Grand Rapids Michigan	2016-July 17	USATF Masters Championships	
70+	4:24.83	Sprint Force America: Larry Colbert; Mack Stewart; Richard Rizzo; Bob Lida	1937-Feb-06; 1937-Feb-16; 1937-Sep-19; 1936-Nov-11		Philadelphia	2008-Apr-25	Penn Relays	
80+	6:41.73	USA : Sam Hirabayashi; Mel Larsen; Bill Melville; Bill Daprano	1927-May-24; 1924-Jun-24; 1927-Jul-13; 1927-Feb-02		Riccione, Italy	2007-Sep-15	World Master Championships	
85+	12:41.69	U.S.A. Charles Ross; Orville Rogers; Roy Englert; Charles Boyle	1922-Dec-03; 1917-Nov-28; 1922-Sep-11; 1923-Nov-22		Winston-Salem, North Carolina	2014-Jul-20	USATF Masters Championships	

=== Men's 4 × 800 meters relay ===
Age group	Record	Athlete	Birthdate	Age	Place	Date	Meet	Ref.
35+	7:55.67	USA : Miles Smith; Michael Schroer; Jason Rhodes; Scott Anderson			Williamsburg, Virginia	2010-Apr-03		
35+ Club	8:12.33	SoCal TC: Terrance Spann; Bryan Dameworth; Alex Hastings; Brian Sax	1974-Jun-28 1971-Jun-14		Walnut, California	2010-Apr-16	Mt. SAC Relays	
40+	7:54.17	USA : John Hinton; Brian Pope; Kevin Paulk; Tony Young	1962-May-01; 1962-Dec-03; 1960-Jul-28; 1962-Apr-12		Eugene, Oregon	2004-Jun-27	Hayward Track Classic	
40+ Club	8:09.46	Central Park TC: Neil Fitzgerald; Anselm LeBourne; Chris Potter; Gladstone Jones	1968-May-08; 1959-Apr-20		New York City	2009-Jul-11		
45+	9:24.15	USA : Barry Phelps; David White; Kirt Iverson; Tom Legan			San Mateo, California	2019-Jun-09	USATF Pacific Masters Championships	
50+	8:40.32	USA : Stephen Chantry; James Robinson; Bob Prather; Russell Patton	1954-Dec-25; 1953-Oct-28; 1955-Jul-25; 1955-May-05		Honolulu, Hawaii	2005-Aug-07	USATF Masters Championships	
50+ Club	8:41.55	SoCal TC: Nolan Shaheed; Larry Barnum; David Salazar; Dave Clingan	1949-Jul-18; 1943-Nov-23; 1950-Sep-09; 1954-Jun-13		Decatur, Illinois	2004-Aug-08	USATF Masters Championships	
60+	9:30.92	USA: David Schmanski; Horace Grant; Stephen Chantry; George Haywood	1954-Jul-03; 1953-Jan-15; 1954-Dec-25; 1952-Sep-30	61; 62; 60; 62	Jacksonville, Florida	2015-Jul-16	USATF Masters Championships	
60+	9:35.99	SoCal TC: John Darlington; Frank Condon; Dennis Duffy; Larry Barnum	1944-Nov-22; 1942-Jul-13; 1943-Jan-18; 1943-Nov-23		Santa Barbara, California	2005-Oct-01	Club West	
70+	11:09.87	USA : Jim Selby; Alfonse Escobar; Gunnar Linde; Avery Bryant	1928-Jul-18 1928-July-14; 1924-May-25		Orono, Maine	1998-Aug-02	USATF Masters Championships	
70+ Club	11:46.91	WVJS: Dave Valles; Ray Stewart; Boyce Jacques; Joe King	1923-Dec-29; 1926-Dec-16; 1926-Sep-24; 1926-May-09		San Jose, California	1997-Aug-10	USATF Masters Championships	
90+	28:17.10	USA : Charles Ross; Orville Rogers; Roy Englert; Charles Boyle	1922-Dec-03; 1917-Nov-28; 1922-Sep-09; 1923-Nov-22		Jacksonville, Florida	2015-Jul-16	USATF Masters Championships	

=== Men's High jump ===
Age group	Record	Athlete	Birthdate	Age	Place	Date	Meet	Ref.
35-39	2.31 m (7 ft 6 3/4 in)	Jamie Nieto	1976-Nov-02	35	Eugene, United States	2012-Jun-09		
40-44	2.11 m (6 ft 11 in)	Jim Barrineau	1955-Jun-25	40	Buffalo, United States	1995-Jul-19	WAVA Championships	
40-44	2.15 m (7 ft 1/2 in)	Glen Conley	1957-Jan-09	40	Albany, United States	1997-Aug-02	Empire State Games	
45-49	2.05 m (6 ft 8 1/2 in)	Charles Austin	1967-Dec-19	46	San Marcos, United States	2014-Jun-21	South Texas USATF Championships	
50-54	1.94 m (6 ft 4 1/4 in)	Bruce McBarnette	1957-Oct-07	52	Newport News, United States	2010-Jun-19		
55-59	1.84 m (6 ft 1/4 in)	Bruce McBarnette	1957-Oct-07	56	Winston-Salem, United States	2014-Jul-19	USATF Masters Championships	
60-64	1.76 m (5 ft 9 1/4 in) i	Bruce McBarnette	1957-Oct-07	50	Landover, United States	2018-Mar-17	USATF Masters Indoor Championships	
60-64	1.73 m (5 ft 8 in)	Willie Banks	1956-Mar-11	60	Norwalk, United States	2016-May-28		
65-69	1.66 m (5 ft 5 1/4 in)	Phil Fehlen	1935-Jul-03	65	Eugene, United States	2000-Aug-12	USATF Masters Championships	
70-74	1.58 m (5 ft 2 in)	David Montieth	1945-Aug-31	70	Grand Rapids, United States	2016-Jul-16	USATF Masters Championships	
70-74	1.58 m (5 ft 2 in)	James Sauers	1948-Jun-01	70	Spokane, United States	2018-Jul-27	USATF Masters Championships	
75-79	1.45 m (4 ft 9 in)	Charles Rader		75	Los Angeles, United States	2023-June-3	Pasadena Senior Games	
80-84	1.37 m (4 ft 5 3/4 in)	Richard Lowery	1931-Apr-06	80	Humble, Texas	2011-Jun-23	Senior Olympics	
85-89	1.20 m (3 ft 11 in)	Bernhard Stamm		85	Columbia, United States	2024-Jun-29		
90-94
90-94	1.15 m (3 ft 9 1/4 in)	Donald Pellmann	1915-Aug-15	90	Fort Collins, Colorado	2005-Sep-04	Rocky Mountain Masters	
90-94	1.11 m (3 ft 7 1/2 in)	Donald Pellmann	1915-Aug-15	90	St George, Utah	2005-Oct-04	Huntsman World Senior Games	
95-99	0.99 m (3 ft 2 3/4 in)	Donald Pellmann	1915-Aug-15	95	Palo Alto, California	2011-Mar-27	Bay Area Senior Games	
100-104	0.90 m (2 ft 11 1/4 in)	Donald Pellmann	1915-Aug-15	100	San Diego, California	2015-Sep-20	San Diego Senior Olympics	

=== Men's Pole vault ===
Age group	Record	Athlete	Birthdate	Age	Place	Date	Meet	Ref.	Video
35-39	5.88 m (19 ft 3 1/4 in) i	Jeff Hartwig	1967-Sep-25	36	Jonesboro, Arkansas	2004-Feb-22			
35-39	5.86 m (19 ft 2 1/2 in)	Jeff Hartwig	1967-Sep-25	36	Jonesboro, Arkansas	2004-Jul-04			
40-44	5.70 m (18 ft 8 1/4 in)	Jeff Hartwig	1967-Sep-25	40	Eugene, Oregon	2008-Jun-29	U.S. Olympic Trials		
45-49	5.10 m (16 ft 8 3/4 in)	Larry Jessee	1952-Mar-31	45	El Paso, Texas	1997-Aug-10			
45-49	5.14 m (16 ft 10 1/4 in) i	Paul Babbits	1960-Dec-24	45	Fort Wayne, Indiana	2008-Feb-24			
50-54	4.75 m (15 ft 7 in)	Gary Hunter	1956-Feb-26	51	Orono, Maine	2007-Aug-04	USATF Masters Championships		
50-54	4.90 m (16 ft 3/4 in)	Gary Hunter	1956-Feb-26	51	Fort Wayne, Indiana	2007-Sep-28			
55-59	4.36 m (14 ft 3 1/2 in)	Gary Hunter	1956-Feb-26	55	Olathe, Kansas	2013-Jul-13	USATF Masters Championships		
55-59	4.52 m (14 ft 9 3/4 in) i	Paul Babbits	1960-Dec-24	45	Fort Wayne, Indiana	2016-Apr-09			
60-64	4.11 m (13 ft 5 3/4 in)	Gary Hunter	1956-Feb-26	60	Muncie, Indiana	2016-Apr-11			
65-69	3.89 m (12 ft 9 in)	John Altendorf	1946-Mar-12	65	Bend, Oregon	2011-Aug-13			
70-74	3.49 m (11 ft 5 1/4 in)	John Altendorf	1946-Mar-12	74	McMinnville, Oregon	2016-Apr-02			
75-79	3.20 m (10 ft 5 3/4 in)	Don Isett	1939-May-16	75	Dallas, Texas	2014-May-31			
80-84	2.75 m (9 ft 1/4 in) i	William Bell	1922-Mar-19	80	Boston, Massachusetts	2002-Mar-22	USATF Indoor National Masters Championships		
80-84	2.75 m (9 ft 1/4 in)	Bud Held	1927-Oct-25	80	Santa Barbara, California	2008-Oct-04	Club West		
85-89	2.44 m (8 ft 0 in) i	William Bell	1922-Mar-19	85	Boston, Massachusetts	2007-Mar-23	USATF Indoor National Masters Championships		
85-89	2.28 m (7 ft 5 3/4 in)	Frank Dickey	1932-Jan-07	85	San Antonio, Texas	2017-Apr-09			
90-94	2.05 m (6 ft 8 1/2 in)	William Bell Sr.	1922-Mar-19	90	Olathe, Kansas	2013-Jul-12	USATF National Masters Championships		
95-99	1.35 m (4 ft 5 in)	William Bell Sr.	1922-Mar-19	95	Baton Rouge, Louisiana	2017-Jul-15	USATF National Masters Championships		

=== Men's long jump ===
Age group	Record	Athlete	Birthdate	Age	Place	Date	Meet	Ref.
35-39	8.50 m (27 ft 10 1/2 in) (+1.9 m/s)	Larry Myricks	1956-Mar-10	35	New York City	1991-Jun-15		
35-39	8.50 m (27 ft 10 1/2 in) (−1.3 m/s)	Carl Lewis	1961-Jul-01	35	Atlanta	1996-Jul-29	1996 Olympics	
40-44	7.68 m (25 ft 2 1/4 in) (+1.5 m/s) A	Aaron Sampson	1961-Sep-20	40	Cedar City, Utah	2002-Jun-21		
45-49	6.98 m (22'10¾")	John Hartfield	1944-Nov-04	46	Atlanta, Georgia	1991-Jun-07		
50-54	6.48 m (21 ft 3 in) (+0.5 m/s)	Antonio Palacios	1966-Apr-18	50	Grand Rapids, Michigan	2016-Jul-16	USATF Masters Championships	
50-54	6.50 m (21 ft 3 3/4 in) i	Antonio Palacios	1966-Apr-18	50	Albuquerque, New Mexico	2017-Feb-18		
55-59	6.14 m (20 ft 1 1/2 in) (+0.0 m/s)	Brian Hankerson	1959-Oct-04	56	Alexandria, Virginia	2015-Sep-6	Potomic Valley Games	
55-59	6.30 m (20 ft 8 in) (+>2.0 m/s) w	Tom Patsalis	1921-Dec-06	55	Santa Ana, California	1977-Jun-18	AAU West Region Championships	
60-64	6.07 m (19 ft 10 3/4 in)	Tom Patsalis	1921-Dec-06	60	Los Angeles	1982-Jul-10	TAC Southern California Masters Championships	
65-69	5.38 m (17 ft 7 3/4 in)	Roger Parnell	1949-May-08	65	St. George, Utah	2014-Oct-06	Huntsman World Senior Games	
70-74	5.19 m (17 ft 1/4 in) (−0.8 m/s)	Melvin Larsen	1924-Jun-24	70	Eugene	1994-Aug-12	USATF Masters Championships	
75-79	4.57 m (14 ft 11 3/4 in) (+0.7 m/s)	Dick Richards	1934-Jun-28	75	Lahti, Finland	2009-Jul-30	World Masters Championships	
75-79	4.59 m (15 ft 1/2 in) (NWI)	Melvin Larsen	1924-Jun-24	75	Gateshead, England	1999-Jul-31	WAVA Championships	
80-84	4.19 m (13 ft 8 3/4 in) (−0.5 m/s)	Melvin Larsen	1924-Jun-24	80	Decatur, Illinois	2004-Aug-06	USATF Masters Championships	
85-89	3.46 m (11 ft 4 in) (−1.5 m/s)	Edwin Lukens	1921-Dec-09	85	Orono, Maine	2007-Aug-03	USATF Masters Championships	
85-89	3.53 m (11 ft 6 3/4 in)	William Platts	1928-Apr-18	85	St. George, Utah	2013-Oct-07	Human Senior Games	
90-94	3.26 m (10 ft 8 1/4 in)	Donald Pellmann	1915-Aug-15	90	Fort Collins, Colorado	2005-Sep-04	Rocky Mountain Masters	
95-99	1.94 m (6 ft 4 1/4 in) (+1.3 m/s)	Leland McPhie	1914-Mar-10	95	Oshkosh, Wisconsin	2009-Jul-10	USATF Masters Championships	
100-104	1.78 m (5 ft 10 in)	Donald Pellmann	1915-Aug-15	100	San Diego	2015-Sep-20	San Diego Senior Olympics	

=== Men's Triple jump ===
Age group	Record	Athlete	Birthdate	Age	Place	Date	Meet	Ref.
35-39	16.95 m (55 ft 7 1/4 in) (+1.2 m/s)	Ray Kimble	1953-Apr-19	35	Budapest, Hungary	1988-Aug-12		
40-44	16.58 m (54 ft 4 3/4 in) (+2.0 m/s)	Ray Kimble	1953-Apr-19	40	Edinburgh, United Kingdom	1993-Jul-02		
45-49	14.64 m (48 ft 1/4 in) (+0.8 m/s)	Willie Banks	1956-Mar-11	49	San Sebastián, Spain	2005-Sep-02	World Masters Championships	
45-49	15.60 m (51 ft 2 in) (+2.0 m/s)	Ray Kimble	1953-Apr-19	45	Modesto, United States	1999-May-08	Modesto Relays	
50-54	14.00 m (45 ft 11 in)	Willie Banks	1956-Mar-11	50	Santa Barbara, United States	2006-Oct-07	Club West	
55-59	13.36 m (43 ft 9 3/4 in) (+2.0 m/s)	Henry Ellard	1961-Jul-21	55	Greensboro, United States	2016-Jul-31	USA Masters Games	
60-64	12.51 m (41 ft 1/2 in) (+0.8 m/s)	Willie Banks	1956-Mar-11	60	Pasadena, United States	2016-Jun-04		
65-69	10.84 m (35 ft 6 3/4 in)	Tom Patsalis	1921-Dec-06	65	Melbourne, Australia	1987-Dec-05	WAVA Championships	
70-74	10.18 m (33 ft 4 3/4 in) (+1.7 m/s)	James Stookey	1930-Jan-20	70	San Diego, United States	2000-Sep-17		
75-79	9.63 m (31 ft 7 in) i	Robert Hewitt	1930-Mar-30	78	Landover, United States	2009-Mar-20	USATF Masters Indoor Championships	
75-79	9.30 m (30 ft 6 in) (+1.7 m/s)	Edwin Lukens	1921-Dec-09	77	Gateshead, United Kingdom	1999-Aug-04	WAVA Championships	
75-79	9.30 m (30 ft 6 in)	James Stookey	1930-Jan-20	75	Las Vegas, United States	2005-Oct-02	Nevada Senior Games	
80-84	8.65 m (28 ft 4 1/2 in) i	Edwin Lukens	1921-Dec-09	81	Boston, United States	2003-Mar-30		
80-84	8.34 m (27 ft 4 1/4 in)	Robert Hewitt	1930-Mar-30	81	Gresham, United States	2014-Jun-22		
85-89	7.78 m (25 ft 6 1/4 in) (+1.1 m/s)	Edwin Lukens	1921-Dec-09	85	Orono, United States	2007-Aug-05	USATF Masters Championships	
90-94	6.44 m (21 ft 1 1/2 in)	Donald Pellmann	1915-Aug-15	90	Ft. Collins, United States	2005-Sep-04	Rocky Mountain Masters	
95-99	4.00 m (13 ft 1 1/4 in) (−2.9 m/s)	Leland McPhie	1914-Mar-10	95	Oshkosh, United States	2009-Jul-12	USATF Masters Championships	

=== Men's Shot put ===
Age group	Record	Athlete	Birthdate	Age	Place	Date	Meet	Ref.	Video
35-39 (16 lbs.)
35-39 (16 lbs.)	22.67 m (74'4½")	Kevin Toth	1967-Dec-29	35	Lawrence, Kansas	2003-Apr-19	Kansas Relays		
35-39 (16 lbs.)	22.19 m (72'9¾")	Brian Oldfield	1945-Jun-01	38	San Jose, California	1984-May-26	Bruce Jenner Invitational		
40-44 (16 lbs.)	21.41 m (70'3")	Brian Oldfield	1945-Jun-01	40	Innsbruck, Austria	1985-Aug-22			
45-49 (16 lbs.)	16.83 m (55'2¾")	Ed Hill	1942-Sep-15	45		1988-Aug-23			
50-54 (6 kg.)	17.08 m (56'0½")	John Nespoli	1954-Oct-13	50	Pittsburgh	2005-Jun-14	Senior Olympics		
50-54 (5.5 kg.)	17.72 m (58'1½")	Parry O'Brien	1932-Jan-18	51	Los Angeles	1984-Jul-01			
55-59 (6 kg.)
55-59 (6 kg.)	16.45 m (53'11½")	Ladislav Pataki	1946-June-20	56	Santa Cruz, California	2002-Jun-29	Kelfield		
55-59 (6 kg.)	16.23 m (53 ft 2 3/4 in)	James Patterson	1963-May-	55	Seattle, Washington	2018-Jun-2			
60-64 (5 kg.)	16.69 m (54 ft 9 in)	Quenton Torbert	1951-Dec-2	62	Winston-Salem, North Carolina	2014-Jul-14	USATF Masters Championships		
65-69 (5 kg.)	16.66 m (54 ft 7 3/4 in)	Quenton Torbert	1951-Dec-2	65	Eugene, Oregon	2017-Apr-30			
70-74 (4 kg.)	16.33 m (53 ft 6 3/4 in)	Quenton Torbert	1951-Dec-2	70	Eugene, Oregon	2022-Apr-6	Hayward Masters Classic		
75-79 (4 kg)	13.41 m (43 ft 11 3/4 in)	Gary Winters	1939-Jul-16	75	St. Paul, Minnesota	2015-Jul-10	National Senior Games		
80-84 (3 kg)	13.82 m (45'4¼")	Arnie Gaynor	1928-Jan-19	80	Santa Barbara, California	2008-Oct-04	Club West		
85-89 (4 kg.)	11.48 m (37 ft 7 3/4 in)	Phil Shipp	1935-Apr-22	85	Scottsdale, Arizona	2020-Nov-15			
90-94 (4 kg.)	9.58 m (31'5¼")	Donald Pellmann	1915-Aug-15	90	St George, Utah	2005-Oct-03	Huntsman World Senior Games		
95-99	8.21 m (26'11¼")	Donald Pellmann	1915-Aug-15	95	Palo Alto, California	2011-Mar-27	Bay Area Senior Games		
100-104	6.56 m (21 ft 6 1/4 in)	Donald Pellmann	1915-Aug-15	100	San Diego, California	2015-Sep-20	San Diego Senior Olympics		

=== Men's Discus throw ===
Age group	Record	Athlete	Birthdate	Age	Place	Date	Meet	Ref.
35-39 (2 kg.)	71.24 m (233'8")	John Powell	1947-June-25	36	San Jose, California	1984-Jun-09	USA Outdoor Track and Field Championships	
40-44 (2 kg.)	69.48 m (227'11")	Al Oerter	1936-Sep-19	43	Wichita, Kansas	1980-May-31		
45-49 (2 kg.)
45-49 (2 kg.)	67.90 m (222'7")	Al Oerter	1936-Sep-19	47	Long Branch, New Jersey	1983-Nov-12		
45-49 (2 kg.)	66.12 m (216'11")	Al Oerter	1936-Sep-19	45	Westfield, New Jersey	1982-Mar-28		
50-54 (1.5 kg.)
50-54 (1.5 kg.)	65.30 m (214'3")	Al Oerter	1936-Sep-19	50	Delray Beach, Florida	1986-Dec-28		
50-54 (1.5 kg.)	62.74 m (205'10")	Al Oerter	1936-Sep-19	52	Eugene, Oregon	1989-Aug-03	WAVA Championships	
55-59 (1.5 kg.)
55-59 (1.5 kg.)	56.29 m (184 ft 8 in)	Scott Eriksson	1961-Jul-01	55	Lockhart, Texas	2016-Jul-03		
55-59 (1.5 kg.)	55.61 m (182 ft 5 1/4 in)	Scott Eriksson	1961-Jul-01	55	Arlington, Texas	2017-May-27		
60-64 (1 kg.)	59.52 m (195'3")	Joe Keshmiri	1938-Mar-25	60	Salinas	1998-May-19		
65-69 (1 kg)	54.99 m (180'5")	Paul Economides	1945-Jul-25	65	Lisle, Illinois	2010-Aug-07	USATF Throws Championships	
70-74 (1 kg.)	50.27 m (164'11")	Jay Silvester	1937-Aug-27	70	St. George, Utah	2007-Oct-10	Huntsman World Senior Games	
75-79 (1 kg.)	43.83 m (143 ft 9 1/2 in)	Roger Busch	1941-May-04	75	Chester, Pennsylvania	2016-Jun-26		
80-84 (1 kg.)	37.08 m (121'8")	Ross Carter	1914-Mar-10	80	Eugene, Oregon	1994-Jun-26	Hayward Track Classic	
85-89 (1 kg.)	30.81 m (101'1")	Ross Carter	1914-Mar-10	86	Eugene, Oregon	2000-Jul-02	Hayward Track Classic	
90-94 (1 kg.)
90-94 (1 kg.)	29.52 m (96 ft 10 in)	Ian Reed	1927-Jul-10	90	San Mateo, California	2017-Nov-12	Encore Senior Games	
90-94 (1 kg.)	28.49 m (93 ft 5 1/2 in)	Ian Reed	1927-Jul-10	90	San Diego, California	2017-Sep-17		
95-99	18.92 m(62'0½")	Donald Pellmann	1915-Aug-15	95	Palo Alto, California	2011-Mar-27	Bay Area Senior Games	
100-104	14.86 m (48 ft 9 in)	Donald Pellmann	1915-Aug-15	100	San Diego, California	2015-Sep-20	San Diego Senior Olympics	

=== Men's Hammer throw ===
Age group	Record	Athlete	Birthdate	Age	Place	Date	Meet	Ref.	Video
35-39 (16 lbs.)
35-39 (16 lbs.)	82.52 m (270 ft 8 in)	Lance Deal	1961-Aug-21	35	Milan, Italy	1996-Sep-07	IAAF Grand Prix Final		
40-44 (16 lbs.)
40-44 (16 lbs.)	74.49 m (244 ft 4 in)	Lance Deal	1961-Aug-21	40	Palo Alto, California	2002-Jun-21	USA Outdoor Track and Field Championships		
45-49 (16 lbs.)	64.70 m (212'3")	Dave McKenzie	1949-May-10	46	Sacramento, California	1995-Jun-04			
50-54 (6 kg.)	71.71 m (235'3")	Jud Logan	1959-Jul-19	50	Bowling Green, Ohio	2009-Oct-17			
55-59 (6 kg.)	67.27 m (220'8")	Jud Logan	1959-Jul-19	55	Ashland, Ohio	2014-Sep-21			
60-64 (5 kg.)	61.76 m (202'7")	Tom Gage	1943-May-16	61	Reading, Pennsylvania	2004-Aug-14	USATF Masters Weight Pentathlon		
65-69 (5 kg.)	56.32 m (184 ft 9 1/4 in)	Larry Hart	1946-Sep-17	68	Norwalk, California	2015-Jun-20	USATF West Region Championships		
70-74 (4 kg.)	59.04 m (193'8")	Ed Burke	1940-Mar-04	70	Lisle, Illinois	2010-Aug-07	USATF Throws Championships		
75-79 (4 kg.)	51.51 m (169'0")	Bob Ward	1933-Jul-04	75	Eugene, Oregon	2008-Aug-02	Hayward Track Classic		
80-84 (3 kg.)	43.11 m (141'5")	Harvey Lewellen	1929-Feb-15	81	Gresham, Oregon	2010-Jul-11			
85-89 (3 kg.)	33.18 m (108 ft 10 1/4 in)	Harvey Lewellen	1929-Feb-15	85	Portland, Oregon	2015-Jun-21			
90-94 (4 kg.)	25.28 m (82 ft 11 1/4 in)	Curt Davison	1925	92	Birmingham, Alabama	2017-Jun-07	National Senior Games		
95-99 (3 kg.)	20.15 m (66'1")	Trent Lane	1910-Mar-28	96	Charlotte, North Carolina	2006-Aug-04	USATF Masters Championships		
M 100	11.32 m (29'2")	Trent Lane	1910-Mar-28	101	Humble, Texas	2011-Jun-21	Senior Olympics		

=== Men's Weight throw ===
35-39 (35 lbs.)	24.21i m (270'8")	Lance Deal	1961-Aug-21	36	Atlanta, Georgia	1998-Feb-28	USA Indoor Track and Field Championships
35-39 (35 lbs.)	22.48 m (73'9")	Alfred Kruger	1979-Feb-18	35	Ashland, Ohio	2014-Sep-21	
40-44 (35 lbs.)	20.31 m (66 ft 7 1/2 in)	Kenneth Jansson	1958-Jan-20	40	Azusa, California	1998-Sep-05	
40-44 (35 lbs.)	18.89 m (61'11")	Kenneth Jansson	1958-Jan-20	40	Gateshead, England	1999-Aug-07	WAVA Championships
45-49 (35 lbs.)	17.82 m (58'5")	Ken Jansson	1958-Jan-20	47	Arlington, Texas	2005-Aug-13	
50-54 (25 lbs.)	24.24 m (79'6")	Jud Logan	1959-Jul-19	50	Bowling Green, Ohio	2009-Oct-17	
55-59 (25 lbs.)	21.73 m (71'3")	Jud Logan	1959-Jul-19	55	Ashland, Ohio	2014-Sep-21	
60-64 (20 lbs.)	23.57 m (77'4")	Tom Gage	1943-May-16	60	Gresham, Oregon	2003-Jun-28	Portland Masters Classic
65-69 (20 lbs.)	20.18 m (66'2")	Ed Burke	1940-Mar-04	66	Las Vegas	2006-Oct-01	Nevada Senior Games
70-74 (16 lbs.)	22.33 m (73'3")	Ed Burke	1940-Mar-04	70	Los Gatos, California	2012-Jul-19	
75-79 (4 kg.)	19.76 m (64 ft 9 3/4 in)	Ed Burke	1940-Mar-04	75	Seattle, Washington	2015-Aug-29	USATF Throws Championships
80-84 (12 lbs.)	16.88 m (55'4")	Harvey Lewellen	1929-Feb-15	80	Portland, Oregon	2009-Aug-22	USATF Throws Championships
85-89 (12 lbs.)
85-89 (12 lbs.)	12.33 m (40'5")	Adolph Hoffman	1923-Jan-24	85	Austin, Texas	2008-Jul-19	
85-89 (12 lbs.)	12.24 m (40'2")	Harvey Lewellen	1929-Feb-15	85	Gresham, Oregon	2014-Jun-21	
90-94 (12 lbs.)	9.55 m (31'4")	Trent Lane	1910-Mar-28	92	Saint Amant, Louisiana	2002-Nov-09	
95-99 (12 lbs.)	7.56 m (24'9")	Trent Lane	1910-Mar-28	96	Saint Amant, Louisiana	2006-Apr-29	Mardi Gras Weight Pentathlon
M 100	4.47 m (14'7")	Trent Lane	1910-Mar-28	100	Lafayette, Louisiana	2010-Oct-01	Acandia Senior Games

=== Men's Superweight throw ===
35-39 (56 lbs.)	15.16 m (49'9")	Alfred Kruger	1979-Feb-18	35	Ashland, Ohio	2014-Sep-21	
40-44 (56 lbs.)	11.53 m (37'10")	Mark Landa	1972-Dec-26	41	Scottsdale, Arizona	2014-Feb-23	
45-49 (56 lbs.)	11.67 m (38'3")	Jim Wetenhall	1954-Oct-01	47		2002-Jun-02	
50-54 (56 lbs.)	11.21 m (36'9")	Jim Wetenhall	1954-Oct-01	50	Reading, Pennsylvania	2005-Jun-04	Philadelphia Masters Throw a Thon
55-59 (56 lbs.)	10.31 m (33'10")	Jim Wetenhall	1954-Oct-01	55	Reading, Pennsylvania	2010-Jun-06	
60-64 (44 lbs.)	11.30 m (37'1")	John Goldhammer	1953-Jul-29	61	Scottsdale, Arizona	2015-Apr-26	
65-69 (44 lbs.)	10.60 m (34'9")	George Mathews	1943-Jul-28	65	Eugene, Oregon	2008-Aug-03	Hayward Track Classic
70-74 (35 lbs.)	11.67 m (38 ft 3 1/4 in)	Ed Burke	1940-Mar-04	70	Worcester, Massachusetts	2014-Aug-03	
75-79 (35 lbs.)	10.42 m (34 ft 2 in)	Ed Burke	1940-Mar-04	75	Seattle, Washington	2015-Aug-29	USATF Throws Championships
80-84 (25 lbs.)	10.99 m (36'0")	Harvey Lewellen	1929-Feb-15	81	Eugene, Oregon	2010-Jun-27	Hayward Track Classic
85-89 (25 lbs.)	7.42 m (24'4")	Harvey Lewellen	1929-Feb-15	85	Gresham, Oregon	2014-Jun-21	
90-94 (25 lbs.)	5.44 m (17'10")	Antonio Palazzo	1928- -	90	Chelmsford, Massachusetts	2018-May-06	
90-94 (25 lbs.)	4.12 m (13'6")	Trent Lane	1910-Mar-28	93	Raleigh, North Carolina	2003-May-03	Southeastern Masters Meet
95-99 (25 lbs.)	3.63 m (11'11")	Trent Lane	1910-Mar-28	96	Saint Amant, Louisiana	2006-Apr-29	Mardi Gras Weight Pentathlon

=== Men's Javelin throw ===
35-39 (800 g)
35-39 (800 g)	78.85 m (258'6")	Tom Pukstys	1968-May-28	35	La Jolla, California	2004-May-01	
35-39 (800 g)	72.16 m (236'9")	Jason Bender	1960-Nov-13	36	Indianapolis	1997-Jun-14	
40-44 (800 g)	76.91 m (252'4")	Thomas Petranoff	1958-April-08	41	Walnut, California	1999-Jun-12	
45-49 (800 g)
45-49 (800 g)	72.49 m (237'9")	Arnie Bradstock	1962-Apr-24	47	Athens, Georgia	2009-May-09	
45-49 (800 g)	71.75 m (235'4")	Arnie Bradstock	1962-Apr-24	45	Clermont, Florida	2007-May-19	
50-54 (700 g)	70.71 m (232'0")	Michael Brown	1953-Nov-28	51	Clermont, Florida	2005-Apr-09	
55-59 (700 g)	66.11 m (216'10")	Michael Brown	1953-Nov-28	56	Raleigh, North Carolina	2010-Jun-12	USATF Southeast Region Championships
60-64 (600 g)
60-64 (600 g)	62.56 m (205'2")	Larry Stuart	1937-Oct-19	61	Eagle Rock, California	1999-Jun-12	
60-64 (600 g)	58.25 m (191'1")	Gary Stenlund	1940-Aug-07	62	Carolina, Puerto Rico	2003-Jul-08	World Masters Athletics Championships
65-69 (600 g)
65-69 (600 g)	57.83 m (189'8")	Larry Stuart	1937-Oct-19	65	Los Angeles	2003-Apr-10	
65-69 (600 g)	57.67 m (189'2")	Gary Stenlund	1940-Aug-07	65	Edmonds, Washington	2006-Jul-08	Seattle Masters Classic
70-74 (500 g)	52.23 m (171'4")	Gary Stenlund	1940-Aug-07	70	Sacramento, California	2011-Jul-12	World Masters Athletics Championships
75-79 (500 g)	47.12 m (154'7")	Gary Stenlund	1940-Aug-07	75	Eugene, Oregon	2016-Apr-24	Hayward Classic
80-84 (400 g)	39.06 m (128 ft 1 in)	William Platts	1928-Apr-18	80	St. George, Utah	2008-Oct-07	Huntsman World Senior Games
85-89 (400 g)	35.64 m (116 ft 11 in)	William Platts	1928-Apr-18	85	St. George, Utah	2013-Oct-12	Huntsman World Senior Games
90-94 (400 g)	31.46 m (103 ft 2 in)	William Platts	1928-Apr-18	90	Spokane, Washington	2018-Jul-27	USATF Masters Championships
95-99 (400 g)	20.80 m (68 ft 2 in)	Trent Lane	1910-Mar-28	95	Pittsburgh,	2005-Jun-11	Senior Olympics
M 100	8.47 m (27 ft 9 in)	Trent Lane	1910-Mar-28	100	Houston, Texas	2011-Jun-24	Senior Olympics

=== Men's Throws pentathlon ===
35-39	4415 pts.	Alfred Kruger III	1979-Feb-18	35	Ashland, Ohio	2014-09-21	
35-39		Hammer / Shot put / Discus / Javelin / Weight; 70.81m / 14.28m / 47.47m / 46.84m / 22.48m					
40-44	4238 pts.	Mark Landa	1972-Dec-26	40	Mesa, Arizona	2013-May-25	
40-44		Hammer / Shot put / Discus / Javelin / Weight; 53.13m / 15.03m / 47.35m / 48.22m / 17.42m					
45-49	4414 pts	Eric Cole	1970-May-07	46	Lockhart, Texas	2016-Jul-24	
45-49		Hammer / Shot put / Discus / Javelin / Weight; 54.85m / 13.11m / 50.73m / 36.05m / 17.06m					
	4379 pts.	Eric Cole	1970-May-07	45	Arlington, Texas	2015-Jul-18	
		Hammer / Shot put / Discus / Javelin / Weight; 52.94m / 13.78m / 51.24m / 34.34m / 16.65m					
50-54	4572	Tom Gage	1943-May-16	50	Grass Valley, California	1995-Aug-26	
50-54		Hammer / Shot put / Discus / Javelin / Weight; 60.96m / 15.69m / 46.62m / 35.52m* / 21.71m; * 800g javelin					
	4571	Ladislav Pataki	1946-Jun-20	52	Santa Cruz	1998-Sep-18	
		Hammer / Shot put / Discus / Javelin / Weight; 51.92m / 16.98m / 55.30m / 37.84m* / 19.35m; * 800g javelin					
	4336	Ray Burton	1955-Dec-14	51	Mesa, Arizona	2008-Jun-07	USATF Arizona Throws Pentathlon
		Hammer / Shot put / Discus / Javelin / Weight; 50.23m / 15.20m / 51.52m / 43.30m / 18.30m					
	4244 pts.	Jim Wetenhall	1954-Oct-01	52	Wilsall, Montana	2006-Aug-19	USATF Masters Weight Pentathlon
		Hammer / Shot put / Discus / Javelin / Weight; 52.38m / 14.29m / 50.64m / 37.48m / 19.22m					
55-59	4913	Ladislav Pataki	1946-June-20	52	Brisbane, Australia	2001-Jul-08	WAVA Championships
55-59		Hammer / Shot put / Discus / Javelin / Weight; 54.05m / 15.52m / 52.37m / 42.40m / 18.60m					
	4602 pts.	Jim Wetenhall	1954-Oct-01	56	Sacramento, California	2011-Jul-17	WAVA Championships
		Hammer / Shot put / Discus / Javelin / Weight; 53.62m / 13.93m / 46.17m / 41.11m / 18.84m					
60-64	4836 pts.	John Goldhammer	1953-Jul-29	60	Worcester, Massachusetts	2014-Aug-02	USATF Throws Championships
60-64		Hammer / Shot put / Discus / Javelin / Weight; 57.80m / 13.96m / 51.97m / 38.14m / 21.52m					
65-69	5044	Paul Economides	1945-Jul-25	65	Lisle, Illinois	2010-Aug-07	USATF Throws Championships
65-69		Hammer / Shot put / Discus / Javelin / Weight; 50.52m / 14.05m / 54.99m / 35.96m / 18.73m					
70-74	4876	Robert Ward	1933-Jul-04	71	Reading, Pennsylvania	2004-Aug-15	USATF Masters Weight Pentathlon
70-74		Hammer / Shot put / Discus / Javelin / Weight; 51.24m / 13.11m / 43.97m / 34.94m / 18.74m					
75-79	4911 pts.	Robert Ward	1933-Jul-04	75	Coppell, Texas	2008-Jul-26	
75-79		Hammer / Shot put / Discus / Javelin / Weight; 49.08m / 11.25m / 41.04m / 30.30m / 17.72m					
80-84	4703 pts.	Harvey Lewellen	1929-Feb-15	80	Portland, Oregon	2009-Aug-22	USATF Throws Championships
80-84		Hammer / Shot put / Discus / Javelin / Weight; 41.14m / 11.56m / 33.69m / 21.54m / 16.88m					
85-89	4357 pts.	William Platts	1928-Apr-18	85	Seattle, Washington	2015-Aug-30	USATF Throws Championships
85-89		Hammer / Shot put / Discus / Javelin / Weight; 25.59m / 9.37m / 26.10m / 34.80m / 10.21m					
90-94	3435 pts.	George Riser	1924-Apr-30	90	Kent, Ohio	2014-Sep-13	
90-94		Hammer / Shot put / Discus / Javelin / Weight; 16.29m / 8.05m / 22.33m / 12.06m / 8.31m					
M 95	3998	Trent Lane	1910-Mar-28	95	Edmonton, Canada	2005-Jul-31	World Masters Games
M 95		Hammer / Shot put / Discus / Javelin / Weight; 15.50m / 5.56m / 13.66m / 17.72m* / 7.72m					
M 100	3344	Trent Lane	1910-Mar-28	100	Lafayette, Louisiana	2010-Oct-01	Acandia Senior Games
M 100		Hammer / Shot put / Discus / Javelin / Weight; 8.90m / 3.98m / 7.53m / 7.51m / 5.45m					

=== Men's Pentathlon ===
35-39	3490 pts.	Frank Reilly	1948-May-25	39	Eagle Rock, California	1987-Jun-20	TAC Southern California Association Championships
35-39		Long jump (wind) / Javelin / 200m (wind) / Discus / 1500m; 5.94m / 55.94m / 24.84 / 48.18m / 4:41.1					
40-44	3720 pts.	Bart Thomas	1971-Jan-30	40	Charlotte, North Carolina	2011-May-21	
40-44		Long jump (wind) / Javelin / 200m (wind) / Discus / 1500m; 6.52m / 61.06m / 23.18 / 42.05m / 5:50.09					
45-49	3933 pts.	Gary Miller	1937-Oct-10	45	Los Angeles	1983-Sep-30	
45-49		Long jump (wind) / Javelin / 200m (wind) / Discus / 1500m; 6.01m / 48.96m / 23.47 / 35.10m / 4:45.17					
45-49	3724 pts.	Michael Janusey	1957-Aug-13	45	Eugene, Oregon	2003-Aug-07	USATF Masters Championships
45-49		Long jump (wind) / Javelin / 200m (wind) / Discus / 1500m; 5.67m / 55.11m / 24.41 / 35.13m / 5:08.75					
50-54	4057 pts.	Gary Miller	1937-Oct-10	50	Los Angeles	1988-Jun-26	
50-54		Long jump (wind) / Javelin / 200m (wind) / Discus / 1500m; 6.13m / 51.70m* / 24.50 / 38.90m / 5:10.40; * 800g Javelin					
50-54	3599 pts.	Rob Duncanson		50	Honolulu, Hawaii	2005-Aug-04	USATF Masters Championships
50-54		Long jump (wind) / Javelin / 200m (wind) / Discus / 1500m; 5.27m / 44.94m / 25.16 / 33.64m / 4:50.32					
55-59	4005 pts.	Boo Morcom	1921-May-01	56	Gothenburg, Sweden	1977-Aug-13	WAVA Championships
55-59		Long jump (wind) / Javelin / 200m (wind) / Discus / 1500m; 5.40m / 36.42m* / 25.6 / 36.80m / 5:00.2; *800g Javelin					
55-59	3721 pts.	Michael Janusey	1957-Aug-13	55	Raleigh, North Carolina	2013-May-17	USATF Southeast Region Championships
55-59		Long jump (wind) / Javelin / 200m (wind) / Discus / 1500m; 5.19m (−0.9 m/s) / 53.56m / 26.76 (NWI) / 37.60m / 5:58.85					
60-64	3801 pts.	John Alexander	1919-Sep-09	61		1981-May-08	
60-64		Long jump (wind) / Javelin / 200m (wind) / Discus / 1500m; 5.20m / 35.86m* / 26.1 / 38.37m / 5:40.4					
60-64	3619 pts.	Roger Kroodsma	1944-Jan-23	60	Decatur, Illinois	2004-Aug-05	USATF Masters Championships
60-64		Long jump (wind) / Javelin / 200m (wind) / Discus / 1500m; 5.03m / 40.87m / 27.62 / 36.56m / 5:31.44					
65-69	4005 pts.	Boo Morcom	1921-May-01	65		1986-Jul-13	
65-69		Long jump (wind) / Javelin / 200m (wind) / Discus / 1500m; 5.38m / 33.30m* / 28.4 / 37.28m / 5:55.9; *					
65-69	3944 pts.	Roger Kroodsma	1944-Jan-23	65	Oshkosh, Wisconsin	2009-Jul-09	USATF Masters Championships
65-69		Long jump (wind) / Javelin / 200m (wind) / Discus / 1500m; 4.75m (−3.1 m/s) / 39.34m / 28.77 (−1.5 m/s) / 38.41m / 5:51.87					
70-74	3806 pts.	Sherwood Sagedahl	1939-Mar-17	73	Lisle, Illinois	2012-Aug-02	USATF Masters Championships
70-74		Long jump (wind) / Javelin / 200m (wind) / Discus / 1500m; 3.85m / 35.83m / 30.37 / 33.43m / 5:45.96					
75-79	3510 pts.	Robert Hewitt	1930-Mar-30	75	Spokane, Washington	2008-Aug-07	USATF Masters Championships
75-79		Long jump (wind) / Javelin / 200m (wind) / Discus / 1500m; 4.36m (+1.5 m/s) / 25.51m / 30.43 (+0.6 m/s) / 24.92m / 8:05.07					
80-84	3491 pts.	Dan Bulkley	1917-May-04	80	Eugene, Oregon	1998-Sep-03	
80-84		Long jump (wind) / Javelin / 200m (wind) / Discus / 1500m; 3.29m / 19.26m* / 33.96 / 22.10m / 7:01.0					
80-84	3471 pts.	Bill Carter	1922-Oct-02	80	Eugene, Oregon	2003-Aug-07	USATF Masters Championships
80-84		Long jump (wind) / Javelin / 200m (wind) / Discus / 1500m; 3.03m / 24.22m / 34.60 / 30.09m / 8:00.34					
85-89	2703 pts.	Ken Carnine	1908-Feb-21	85	Eagle Rock, California	1993-Jun-18	USATF Southern California Association Pentathlon
85-89		Long jump (wind) / Javelin / 200m (wind) / Discus / 1500m; 2.51m / 21.94m* / 44.52 / 24.92m / DNF					
85-89	2647 pts.	Bill Carter	1922-Oct-02	85	Spokane, Washington	2008-Aug-07	USATF Masters Championships
85-89		Long jump (wind) / Javelin / 200m (wind) / Discus / 1500m; 2.63m (+1.8 m/s) / 19.15m / 45.68 (+0.6 m/s) / 22.33m / 10:35.99					
90-94	2629 pts.	Ralph Maxwell	1919-Nov-11	90	Sacramento, California	2010-Jul-22	USATF Masters Championships
90-94		Long jump (wind) / Javelin / 200m (wind) / Discus / 1500m; 2.84m (+1.3 m/s) / 13.20m / 42.69 (−1.2 m/s) / 13.48m / DNF					

=== Men's Ultraweight Pentathlon ===
35-39	4244 pts.	Mark Landa	1972-Dec-26	39	Seattle	2012-Aug-19	USATF Throws Championships
40-44	4701 pts.	Mark Landa	1972-Dec-26	40	Lisle, Illinois	2013-Aug-04	USATF Masters Weight and Superweight Championships
45-49	4703 pts.	Eric Cole	1970-May-07	45	Lisle, Illinois	2016-Aug-07	USATF Masters Weight and Superweight Championships
50-54	4905 pts.	Jim Wetenhall	1954-Oct-01	54	Bowling Green, Ohio	2009-Sep-12	
55-59	5623 pts.	Jim Wetenhall	1954-Oct-01	55	Bowling Green, Ohio	2009-Oct-18	
60-64	4692 pts.	Todd Taylor	1946-Sep-15	62	Portland, Oregon	2009-Aug-23	USATF Throws Championships
65-69	4356 pts.	George Mathews	1943-Jul-28	65	Seattle	2008-Sep-06	USATF Masters Weight and Superweight Championships
70-74	3850 pts.	Dick Hotchkiss	1938-Oct-29	70	Portland, Oregon	2009-Aug-23	USATF Throws Championships
75-79	4853 pts.	Bob Ward	1933-Jul-04	76	Portland, Oregon	2009-Aug-23	USATF Throws Championships
80-84	4205 pts.	Harvey Lewellen	1929-Feb-15	80	Portland, Oregon	2009-Aug-23	USATF Throws Championships
95-99	1600 pts.	Leon Joslin	1912-Mar-27	96	Seattle	2008-Sep-06	USATF Masters Weight and Superweight Championships

=== Men's Decathlon ===
35-39	8558 pts.	Kip Janvrin	1965-Jul-08	35	Eugene, Oregon	2001-Jun-21	USA Outdoor Track and Field Championships
35-39	100m (wind) / Long jump (wind) / Shot put / High jump / 400m / 110m H (wind) / Discus / Pole vault / Javelin / 1500m; 10.98 (+1.1 m/s) / 7.01m (+2.9 m/s) / 14.21m / 1.89m / 48.41 / 14.72 (+1.2 m/s) / 45.59m / 5.20m / 60.41m / 4:14.96						
40-44	8542 pts.	Kip Janvrin	1965-Jul-08	40	San Sebastián, Spain	2005-Aug-23	World Masters Athletics Championships
40-44	100m (wind) / Long jump (wind) / Shot put / High jump / 400m / 110m H (wind) / Discus / Pole vault / Javelin / 1500m; 11.56 (−0.8 m/s) / 6.78m (+1.0 m/s) / 14.01m / 1.80m / 49.46 / 15.40 (+0.2 m/s) / 42.70m / 4.70m / 58.43m / 4:25.87						
45-49	7650 pts.	David Burton	1969-Oct-08	45	Walnut, California	2015-May-31	
45-49	100m (wind) / Long jump (wind) / Shot put / High jump / 400m / 110m H (wind) / Discus / Pole vault / Javelin / 1500m; 11.91 (+2.0 m/s) / 6.16m (+0.8 m/s) / 11.90m / 1.75m / 53.96 / 16.37 (−1.0 m/s) / 31.91m / 3.96m / 48.86m / 5:09.15						
45-49	7624 pts.	David Burton	1969-Oct-08	45	San Marcos, Texas	2015-Sep-26	
45-49	100m (wind) / Long jump (wind) / Shot put / High jump / 400m / 110m H (wind) / Discus / Pole vault / Javelin / 1500m; 12.07 (+1.3 m/s) / 5.97m (+2.1 m/s) / 11.52m / 1.76m / 55.19 / 16.32 (+0.6 m/s) / 35.00m / 4.25m / 46.79m / 5:12.09						
50-54	8015	Gary Miller	10.10.37	50	Los Angeles,	27.05.88	TAC Decathlon Championships
50-54	100m (wind) / Long jump (wind) / Shot put / High jump / 400m / 100m H (wind) / Discus / Pole vault / Javelin / 1500m; 12.0 / 5.96m / 12.87m / 1.65m / 53.6 / 15.9 / 40.78m / 3.70m / 47.14m* / 5:00.4; *Note: 800g javelin						
50-54	7467 pts.	Brian Coushay	1964-Mar-18	50	Neosho, Missouri	2014-Jul-06	USATF Decathlon Championships
50-54	100m (wind) / Long jump (wind) / Shot put / High jump / 400m / 100m H (wind) / Discus / Pole vault / Javelin / 1500m; 11.93 (+3.0 m/s) / 6.33m (−0.3 m/s) / 11.63m / 1.75m / 56.68 / 16.99 (−2.1 m/s) / 40.53m / 3.20m / 44.14m / 5:47.36						
55-59	7912	Boo Morcom	1921-May-01	55	Gresham, Oregon	1976-Jul-11	
55-59	100m (wind) / Long jump (wind) / Shot put / High jump / 400m / 100m H (wind) / Discus / Pole vault / Javelin / 1500m; 12.6 / 5.95m / 10.95m / 1.51m / 58.6 / 17.9* / 32.97m / 4.03m / 36.52m* / 5:07.9; *110 Hurdles and 800g javelin						
55-59	7773 pts.	William Murray	1954-Jan-06	55	Lahti, Finland	2009-Jul-28	World Masters Athletics Championships
55-59	100m (wind) / Long jump (wind) / Shot put / High jump / 400m / 110m H (wind) / Discus / Pole vault / Javelin / 1500m; 13.01 (−1.8 m/s) / 5.15m (−1.4 m/s) / 12.20m / 1.54m / 60.95 / 15.77 (−0.6 m/s) / 39.84m / 3.40m / 37.18m / 5:33.42						
60-64	8005w	Phil Mulkey	1933-Jan-07	60	Miyazaki, Japan	1993-Oct-07	WAVA Championships
60-64	100m (wind) / Long jump (wind) / Shot put / High jump / 400m / 100m H (wind) / Discus / Pole vault / Javelin / 1500m; 13.16 (+3.9 m/s) / 5.28m (+0.0 m/s) / 13.75m / 1.53m / 65.40 / 15.27 (+3.2 m/s) / 46.56m / 3.40m / 41.14m / 6:49.78						
60-64	7638 pts.	Doug Osland	1954-Dec-28	60	San Antonio	2015-Jun-28	
60-64	100m (wind) / Long jump (wind) / Shot put / High jump / 400m / 100m H (wind) / Discus / Pole vault / Javelin / 1500m; 13.12 (+0.7 m/s) / 5.25m (+1.2 m/s) / 11.95m / 1.61m / 64.72 / 17.05 (+0.4 m/s) / 40.55m / 3.60m / 35.49m / 6:44.19						
M 65	7661	Boo Morcom	1921-May-01	66	Boulder, Colorado	1987-Jul-12	
M 65	100m (wind) / Long jump (wind) / Shot put / High jump / 400m / 100m H (wind) / Discus / Pole vault / Javelin / 1500m; 14.2 / 5.17m / 11.28m / 1.47m / 65.4 / 18.5 / 32.72m / 3.50m / 29.80m / 6:26.7						
65-69	7727 pts.	Rodney Atherton		65	Jacksonville, Florida	2022-May-29	JAC Combined events
65-69	100m (wind) / Long jump (wind) / Shot put / High jump / 400m / 110m H (wind) / Discus / Pole vault / Javelin / 1500m; 14.06 (+1.5 m/s) / 4.60m (+0.0 m/s) / 11.24m / 1.53m / 69.41 / 16.80 (+0.2 m/s) / 41.13m / 3.25m / 34.20m / 6:49.89						
70-74	7731 pts.	Phil Shipp	1935-Apr-22	70	Mayfield, Ohio	2005-Jul-02	USATF Decathlon Championships
70-74	100m (wind) / Long jump (wind) / Shot put / High jump / 400m / 80m H (wind) / Discus / Pole vault / Javelin / 1500m; 15.70 (−0.6 m/s) / 4.39m / 12.78m / 1.37m / 74.72 / 15.37 (−2.5 m/s) / 42.02m / 2.60m / 38.75m / 6:38.37						
75-79	7954 pts.	Robert Hewitt	1933-Mar-30	75	Joplin, Missouri	2008-Jun-21	USATF National Decathlon / Heptathlon Championships
75-79	100m (wind) / Long jump (wind) / Shot put / High jump / 400m / 80m H (wind) / Discus / Pole vault / Javelin / 1500m; 14.37 (+1.1 m/s) / 4.28m / 9.09m / 1.34m / 69.87 / 15.04 (−0.5 m/s) / 28.37m / 2.70m / 24.19m / 7:44.85						
80-84	8302 pts.	Robert Hewitt	1933-Mar-30	80	Charlotte, North Carolina	2013-Jun-22	USATF Masters Combined Events Championships
80-84	100m (wind) / Long jump (wind) / Shot put / High jump / 400m / 80m H (wind) / Discus / Pole vault / Javelin / 1500m; 15.39 (−0.1 m/s) / 4.16m (−0.7 m/s) / 10.18m / 1.25m / 80.16 / 15.98 (+0.0 m/s) / 26.53m / 2.35m / 26.51m / 8:56.90						
85-89	5858 pts.	Denver Smith	1925-Oct-02	85	Sacramento, California	2011-Jul-07	World Masters Athletics Championships
85-89	100m (wind) / Long jump (wind) / Shot put / High jump / 400m / 110m H (wind) / Discus / Pole vault / Javelin / 1500m; 19.75 (−0.9 m/s) / 2.66m (+1.7 m/s) / 8.65m / 1.09m / 2:00.30 / 20.80 (−1.5 m/s) / 22.91m / 1.90m / 21.82m / 12:08.81						
90-94	7009 pts.	Ralph Mawell	1919-Nov-26	91	Sacramento, California	2011-Jul-07	World Masters Athletics Championships

== Women ==
Key: Awaiting ratification

=== Women's 100 meters ===
Age group	Record	Athlete	Birthdate	Age	Place	Date	Meet	Ref.	Video
35-39	11.05 (+1.6 m/s)	Gail Devers	1966-Nov-19	37	Eugene, Oregon	2004-Jun-19	Prefontaine Classic		
35-39	11.01 (+1.2 m/s)	Carmelita Jeter	1979-Nov-24	35	Eugene, Oregon	2015-Jun-26	USA National Championships		
40-44	12.31	Phil Raschker	1947-Feb-21	40	Melbourne, Australia	1987-Dec-01	WAVA Championships		
40-44	12.31 (−1.8 m/s)	Renee Henderson	1964-Jul-01	44	Spokane, Washington	2008-Aug-09	USATF Masters Championships		
40-44	12.03	Phil Raschker	1947-Feb-21	40	Eugene, Oregon	1987-Aug-14	USATF Masters Championships		
40-44	12.29 (+2.0 m/s)	Dena Birade	1972-May-19	40	Lisle, Illinois	2012-Aug-04	USATF Masters Championships		
45-49	12.10 (+1.6 m/s)	Renee Henderson	1964-Jul-01	45	Lahti, Finland	2009-Aug-02	World Masters Athletics Championships		
50-54	12.50 (+1.6 m/s)	Phil Raschker	1947-Feb-21	50	Atlanta, Georgia	1997-May-17			
55-59	13.27 (+1.3 m/s)	Joy Upshaw-Margerum	1961-Feb-24	55	Glendale, California	2017-Oct-01			
55-59	13.22 (+1.1 m/s)	Joy Upshaw-Margerum	1961-Feb-24	55	Azusa, California	2016-Apr-15	Bryan Clay Invitational		
60-64	13.64 (+0.9 m/s)	India Bridgette	1961-Nov-	60	Miramar, Florida	2022-May-12	National Senior Games		
65-69	14.10 (+1.5 m/s)	Nadine O'Connor	1942-Mar-05	65	San Marcos, California	2007-Jun-30	Chuck McMahon Memorial Meet		
70-74	14.76 (+0.3 m/s)	Kathy Bergen	1939-Dec-24	70	Walnut, California	2010-Apr-17	Mt. SAC Relays		
75-79	15.31 (+1.4 m/s)	Kathy Bergen	1939-Dec-24	75	Walnut, California	2015-Apr-18	Mt. SAC Relays		
80-84	16.23 (+1.3 m/s)	Kathy Bergen	1939-Dec-24	81	San Diego	2021-Sep-19	San Diego Senior Games		
85-89
85-89	21.46 (−0.1 m/s)	Mary Bowermaster	1917-Jul-26	85	Pittsburgh	2003-May-29	National Senior Games		
85-89	21.80	Marjorie Fitzgerald		85	St. George, Utah	2012-Oct-9	Huntsman Senior Games		
90-94	24.22 (+1.4 m/s)	Diane Hoffman		90	Worcester, Massachusetts	2018-Jul-06	USATF Masters East Region Championships		
95-99	30.18 (−0.3 m/s)	Diane Friedman	1921-Jul-18	96	Bedford, Ohio	2017-Jul-22	Lake Erie Open & Masters Outdoor Championship		
100-104	39.62 (+0.2 m/s)	Julia Hawkins	1916-Feb-09	101	Birmingham, Alabama	2017-Jun-10	National Senior Games		

=== Women's 200 meters ===
Age group	Record	Athlete	Birthdate	Age	Place	Date	Meet	Ref.
35-39	22.11 (+1.3 m/s)	Allyson Felix	1985-Nov-18	35	Eugene	2021-Jun-26	U.S. Olympic Trials	
40-44	24.84	Phil Raschker	1947-Feb-21	42	Eugene, Oregon	1989-Aug-03	WAVA Championships	
45-49	25.28 (+0.0 m/s)	Renee Henderson	1964-Jul-01	47	Sacramento, California	2011-Jul-12	World Masters Athletics Championships	
50-54	25.72 (−0.1 m/s)	Phil Raschker	1947-Feb-21	50	Durban, South Africa	1997-Jul-23	WAVA Championships	
55-59	27.54 (+1.4 m/s)	Joy Upshaw	1961-Feb-24	55	Grass Valley, California	2016-Jun-25		
60-64	28.54 (+1.5 m/s)	Phil Raschker	1947-Feb-21	60	Orono, Maine	2007-Aug-05	USATF Masters Championships	
65-69	29.37 (+1.8 m/s)	Nadine O'Connor	1942-Mar-05	65	Los Angeles, California	2007-Jul-08		
70-74	31.39 (+1.2 m/s)	Kathy Bergen	1939-Dec-24	72	Pasadena, California	2012-Jul-22	USATF West Region Masters Championships	
75-79	33.79 (+1.8 m/s)	Kathy Bergen	1939-Dec-24	75	Lyon, France	2015-Aug-10	2015 World Masters Athletics Championships	
80-84
80-84	36.80 (+0.3 m/s)	Irene Obera	1933-Dec-07	80	Winston-Salem, North Carolina	2014-Jul-20	USATF Masters Championships	
80-84	35.69	Irene Obera	1933-Dec-07	80	San Mateo, California	2014-May-10	Bay Area Senior Games	
85-89
85-89	51.10 (−0.1 m/s)	Molly MacKown	1918-Feb-27	85	Pittsburgh, Pennsylvania	2003-May-31	National Senior Games	
85-89	51.43 (−0.4 m/s)	Pat Peterson	1926-Apr-14	85	Sacramento California	2011-Jul-12	World Masters Athletics Championships	
90-94	70.99	Zora Lux	1905-Jun-03	90	Seattle, Washington	1995-Jun-10	Seattle Masters Classic	
95-99	72.99 (−0.4 m/s)	Diane Friedman	1921-Jul-18	96	Bedford, Ohio	2017-Jul-22	Lake Erie Open & Masters Outdoor Championship	

=== Women's 400 meters ===
Age group	Record	Athlete	Birthdate	Age	Place	Date	Meet	Ref.
35-39	50.27	Jearl Miles Clark	1966-Sep-04	36	Madrid, Spain	2002-Sep-20	Meeting de Atletismo Madrid	
35-39	50.02	Allyson Felix	1985-Nov-18	35	Eugene	2021-Jun-20	U.S. Olympic Trials	
40-44
40-44	55.18	Jearl Miles Clark	1966-Sep-04	41	Gainesville, Florida	2008-Apr-04	Florida Relays	
40-44	56.90	Latrica Dendy	1972-Nov-05	44	Perth, Australia	2016-Nov-05	World Masters Athletics Championships	
45-49	56.82	Mary Libal	1950-Jun-28	45	Buffalo, New York	1995-Jul-22	WAVA Championships	
50-54	61.02	Emmanuelle McGowan	1968-Jun-14	50	Málaga, Spain	2018-Sep-14	World Masters Athletics Championships	
55-59	1:03.43	Sue McDonald	1963-Mar-29	58	Montecito, California	2022-Feb-12	Westmont Sunshine Open	
60-64	1:02.34	Sue McDonald	1963-Mar-29	60	Greensboro, North Carolina	2023-Jul-21	USA Masters Championships	
65-69	71.45	Carolyn Cappetta	1935-Dec-27	65	Brisbane, Australia	2001-Jul-13	WAVA Championships	
70-74	77.92	Jeanne Daprano	1936-Sep-16	70	Riccione, Italy	2007-Sep-14	World Masters Athletics Championships	
75-79	1:22.39	Jeanne Daprano	1936-Sep-16	75	Lisle Illinois	2012-Aug-02	USATF Masters Championships	
80-84	1:33.94	Rose Green	1938-Aug-20	80	Málaga, Spain	2018-Sep-14	World Masters Athletics Championships	
80-84	1:33.80	Irene Obera	1933-Dec-07	80	Santa Rosa, California	2014-May-31		
85-89	2:07.79	Pat Peterson	1926-Apr-14	85	Sacramento California	2011-July-16	World Masters Athletics Championships	
90-94	3:05.02	Betty Lindberg	1924-Sep	92	Decatur Georgia	2017-May-09		
95-99	4:29.64	Hollyce Kirkland	1919-Oct-	96	Birmingham, Alabama	2017-Jun-08	National Senior Games	

=== Women's 800 meters ===
Age group	Record	Athlete	Birthdate	Age	Place	Date	Meet	Ref.
35-39	1:57.27	Jearl Miles Clark	1966-Sep-04	37	Athens, Greece	2004-Aug-23	Olympic Games	
40-44	2:03.95	Ruth Wysocki	1957-Mar-08	40	Long Beach, California	1997-May-03	Steve Scott Invitational	
45-49	2:13.67	Alisa Harvey	1965-Sep-16	45	Fairfax, Virginia	2011-Apr-09		
50-54
50-54	2:20.32	Alisa Harvey	1965-Sep-16	50	Des Moines, Iowa	2016-Apr-29		
50-54	2:21.98	DeeDee Grafius	1949-Sept-04	50	Davis, California	1999-Apr-17		
55-59	2:22.01	Michelle Rohl	1965-Nov-12	56	Rochester, New York	2022-May-15		
60-64	2:22.52	Sue McDonald	1963-Mar-29	60	Los Angeles, California	2023-May-6		
65-69	2:39.61	Sabra Harvey	1949-Mar-02	67	Perth, Australia	2016-Oct-31	World Masters Championships	
70-74	2:50.66	Sabra Harvey	1949-Mar-02	70	Toronto, Canada	2019-Jul-19	NCCWMA	
75-79	3:07.35	Jeanne Daprano	1936-Sep-16	75	Moorpark, California	2011-Oct-23	Club West	
80-84	3:47.07	Jeanne Daprano	1936-Sep-16	80	Perth, Australia	2016-Oct-31	World Masters Championships	
85-89
85-89	5:12.45	Lynne Hurrell	1934-Aug-04	85	Tampere, Finland	2022-Ju1-01	World Masters Championships	
90-94	5:44.50	Colleen Milliman	1926-Aug-21	91	Eugene, Oregon	2018-May-6		

=== Women's 1,500 meters ===
Age group	Record	Athlete	Birthdate	Age	Place	Date	Meet	Ref.
35-39	4:00.35	Regina Jacobs	1963-Aug-28	36	Siviglia, Spain	1999-Aug-28	World Championships	
35-39	3:59.98 i	Regina Jacobs	1963-Aug-28	39	Boston, Massachusetts	2003-Feb-01	Boston Indoor Games	
40-44
40-44	4:08.69	Ruth Wysocki	1957-Mar-08	40	Los Angeles, California	1997-May-17	Reebok Vo2 Max Classic	
45-49	4:29.61	Sonja Friend-Uhl	1971-Mar-22	45	Gainesville, Florida	2016-Apr-01	Florida Relays	
50-54	4:51.86	Marisa Sutera Strange	1963-Jun-12	52	Jacksonville, Florida	2015-Jul-24	USATF Masters Championships	
50-54	4:49.91	Sylvia Mosqueda	1966-Apr-08	50	Norwalk, California	2016-Jun-04	Southern California USATF Championships	
55-59	4:47.62	Michelle Rohl	1965-Nov-12	56	Tampere, Finland	2022-Ju1-07	World Masters Championships	
60-64	5:02.38	Sue McDonald	1963-Mar-29	60	Las Vegas, Nevada	2023-Oct-25	Nevada Senior Games	
65-69	5:25.65	Kathryn Martin	1951-Sep-30	65	Toronto, Canada	2017-Aug-11	NCC Masters Championships	
70-74	6:02.47	Sabra Harvey	1949-Mar-02	70	Toronto, Canada	2019-Jul-21	NCCWMA	
75-79	6:41.88	Jeanne Daprano	1936-Sep-16	75	Raleigh, North Carolina	2012-May-12		
80-84	7:39.05	Lynne Hurrell	1934-Aug-04	80	Hayward, California	2015-May-31	Pacific Association USATF Championships	
85-89	10:55.01	Gerry Davidson	1921-Mar-12	85	Charlotte, North Carolina	2006-Aug-06	USATF Masters Championships	
90-94	14:34.32	Dottie Gray	1925-Jun-14	90	St. Paul, Minnesota	2015-Jul-10	National Senior Games	
95-99	20:27.85	Hollyce Kirkland	1919-Oct-	95	St. Paul, Minnesota	2015-Jul-10	National Senior Games	

=== Women's Mile ===
Age group	Record	Athlete	Birthdate	Age	Place	Date	Meet	Ref.
35-39	4:26.10	Mary Slaney	1958-Aug-04	38	Philadelphia	1997-Apr-26	Penn Relays	
40-44	4:45.68	Sonja Friend-Uhl	1971-Mar-22	44	Nashville, Tennessee	2015-Jun-06		
45-49	4:56.28	Kris Paaso	1971-Jan-12	45	San Francisco, California	2016-Apr-02		
50-54	5:15.55	Kathryn Martin	1951-Sep-30	50	Alexandria, Virginia	2002-Sep-01		
55-59	5:30.02	Doreen McCoubrie	1961-Oct-31	56	Alexandria, Virginia	2018-Sep-02		
60-64	5:28.02	Sue McDonald	1963-Mar-29	60	Claremont, California	2023-Jun-3	USATF Southern California Masters Championships	
65-69	5:55.99	Kathryn Martin	1951-Sep-30	65	Grass Valley, California	2017-May-20		
70-74	6:38:30	Sharon Gerl	1948-Mar-19	70	Eugene, Oregon	2018-May-06		
75-79	6:58.44	Jeanne Daprano	1936-Sep-16	75	Pasadena, California	2012-July-21	USATF West Region	
80-84	8:35.04	Jeanne Daprano	1936-Sep-16	80	Greenville, South Carolina	2017-Jun-03		
85-89	10:55.25	Blanche Cummings	1929-Aug-	85	Norwalk, California	2015-Jun-20	USATF West Region Championships	
90-94	13:26.46	Colleen Sandstrom Milliman	1926-Aug-21	90	Eugene, Oregon	2017-Apr-30	Hayward Masters Classic	
95-99	13:46.13	Colleen Sandstrom Milliman	1926-Aug-21	95	Eugene, Oregon	2022-Apr-6	Hayward Masters Classic	

=== Women's 3,000 meters ===
Age group	Record	Athlete	Birthdate	Age	Place	Date	Meet	Ref.
35-39
35-39	8:35.02	Libbie Hickman	1965-Feb-17	35	Gateshead, Great Britain	2000-Aug-28		
35-39	8:51.84	Francis Larrieu	1952-Nov-23	35	Chiba, Japan	1988-Sep-11		
40-44	9:27.45	Carmen Troncoso	1959-Apr-02	41	Portland, Oregon	2000-Jun-25		
45-49	9:45.66	Kris Paaso	1971-Jan-12	45	Portland, Oregon	2016-Jun-11		
50-54	10:06.60	Carmen Troncoso	1959-Apr-02	51	Portland, Oregon	2010-Jun-12	Portland Track Festival	
55-59	10:36.79+	Michelle Rohl	1965-Nov-12	56	Lewisburg, Pennsylvania	2022-Apr-14		
60-64	11:11.49	Sabra Harvey	1949-Mar-02	61	Portland, Oregon	2010-Jun-12	Portland Track Festival	
65-69	11:42.8h	Kathryn Martin	1951-Sep-30	65	Alexandria	2017-Sep-03		
70-74	14:41.60	Mary Harada	1935-Jun-16	70	Springfield, Massachusetts	2005-Jul-23	Massachusetts Senior Games	
75-79
75-79	15:38.98	Mary Harada	1935-Jun-16	75	Scarborough, Maine	2010-Aug-21	Maine Senior Games	
75-79	17:37.2	Bess James	1909-Sep-05	75		1985-Aug-10		
80-84	20:41.04	Gerry Davidson	1921-Mar-12	83	Long Beach, California	2004-Oct-17	Self Trancendence	

=== Women's 5,000 meters ===
Age group	Record	Athlete	Birthdate	Age	Place	Date	Meet	Ref.	Video
35-39	14:45.11	Shannon Rowbury	1984-Sep-19	35	Monaco	2020-Aug-14	Herculis		
40-44	15:45.94	Jennifer Rhines	1974-Jul-01	41	Stanford, California	2016-May-01			
45-49	16:01.73	Monica Joyce	1958-Jul-16	49	Waltham, Massachusetts	2008-May-24			
50-54	17:25.6	Shirley Matson	1940-Nov-11	50	Alameda, California	1991-Sep-26			
50-54	16:19.51	Monica Joyce	1958-Jul-16	50	Walnut, California	2009.April.17	Mt. SAC Relays		
55-59	17:44.11	Michelle Rohl	1965-Nov-12	56	Lewisburg, Pennsylvania	2022-Apr-14			
60-64	19:14.8	Marion Irvine	1929-Oct-10	60	Kentfield, California	1989-Oct-19			
65-69	20:08.17	Kathryn Martin	1951-Sep-30	65	Perth, Australia	2016-Oct-28	World Masters Athletics Championships		
70-74	22:27.73	Sabra Harvey	1949-Mar-02	70	Toronto, Canada	2019-Jul-20	NCCWMA		
70-74	21:59.96	Marie Michelsohn	1941-Oct-10	70	New York City	2011-Oct-17			
75-79	26:55.11	Mary Harada	1935-Jun-16	75	Sacramento, California	2010-Jul-22	USATF Masters Championships		
80-84	29:30.02	Gerry Davidson	1921-Mar-12	80	Brisbane, Australia	2001-Jul-06	WAVA Championships		
80-84	27:29.24	Lynne Hurrell	1934-Aug-04	80	San Francisco, California	2015-Jun-20	Pride Track & Field Meet		
85-89	49:08.73	Gerry Davidson	1921-Mar-12	85	Charlotte, North Carolina	2006-Aug-03	USATF Masters Championships		

=== Women's 10,000 meters ===
Age group	Record	Athlete	Birthdate	Age	Place	Date	Meet	Ref.
35-39	31:28.92	Francis Larrieu	1952-Nov-23	38	Austin, Texas	1991-Apr-04	Texas Relays	
40-44	33:32.62	Stephanie Bruce	1984-Jan-14	40	Eugene, Oregon	2024-Jun-29	U.S. Olympic Trials	
40-44	32:19.40	Keira D'Amato	1984-Oct-21	40	Eugene, Oregon	2025-Jul-31	USA Championships	
40-44	33:05.03	Jennifer Rhines	1974-Jul-01	41	Sacramento, California	2015-Dec-06		
45-49	34:44.78	Monica Joyce	1958-Jul-16	49	Hillsdale, Michigan	2008-Apr-28		
50-54	37:04.87	Kirsten Leetch	1965-Dec-23	52	Torrance, California	2018-Apr-19	Mt. SAC Relays	
55-59	39:37.05	Laura Bruess	1960-Oct-18	55	Norwalk, California	2016-Jun-18	USATF West Region Masters Championships	
60-64	41:10.57	Kathryn Martin	1951-Sep-30	62	Olathe, Kansas	2013-Jul-14	USATF National Masters Championships	
65-69	42:34.97	Kathryn Martin	1951-Sep-30	65	Perth, Australia	2016-Nov-02	World Masters Championships	
70-74	46:38.5 h	Marie Michelsohn	1941-Oct-08	70	San Mateo, California	2012-May-27		
75-79	55:26.70	Lois Gilmore	1930-Oct-01	76	Orono, Maine	2007-Aug-04	USATF Masters Championships	
80-84	1:01:22.26	Lynne Hurrell	1934-Aug -04	80	Lyon, France	2015-Aug-15	World Masters Championships	
85-89	1:46:57.50	Mary Haines	1914-Aug-03	85	Gateshead, United Kingdom	1999-Aug-03	WAVA Championships	

=== Women's marathon ===
Age group	Record	Athlete	Birthdate	Age	Place	Date	Meet	Ref.
40-44	2:23:45	Sara Hall		40	Valencia, Spain	2024-Dec-01	Valencia Marathon	
45-49	2:29:32	Roberta Groner		46	Valencia, Spain	2024-Dec-01	Valencia Marathon	
50-54	2:37:36	Linda Somers Smith		50	Houston, United States	2012-Jan-14	U.S. Olympic Trials	
55-59	2:45:47	Jenny Hitchings		59	London, United Kingdom	2023-Apr-23	London Marathon	
60-64	2:49:33	Jenny Hitchings		60	Chicago, United States	2023-Oct-08	Chicago Marathon	
65-69	3:16:04	Gwen Jacobson		65	Chicago, IL	2023-Oct-08	Chicago Marathon	
70-74	3:24:48	Jeannie Rice		71	Berlin, Germany	2019-Sep-29	Berlin Marathon	
75-79	3:33:27	Jeannie Rice		76	London, United Kingdom	2024-Apr-21	London Marathon	
80-84	5:07:31	Hansi Rigney		81	Berlin, Germany	2023-Sep-24	Berlin Marathon	
85-89	6:53:50	Ida Mintz		85	Chicago, United States	1990-Oct-28	Chicago Marathon	
90-94	8:53:08	Mavis Lindgren		90	Portland, United States	1997-Sep-28	Portland Marathon	

=== Women's 80 meters hurdles ===
Age group	Record	Athlete	Birthdate	Age	Place	Date	Meet	Ref.	Video
40-44 (30")	11.47	Stephanie Thomas	1964-Jul-06	41	Los Gatos, California	2005-Aug-11	All-comers track meet		
45-49 (30")	12.02 (+0.0 m/s)	Rachel Guest	1975-April-15	45	Surprise, Arizona	2021-March-28	USATF Masters Meet		
50-54 (30")	12.19 (−1.9 m/s)	Joy Upshaw	1961-Feb-24	50	Sacramento California	2011-Jul-16	World Masters Athletics Championships		
55-59 (30")	12.54 (−1.2 m/s)	Neriga Jakstiene	1963-Oct-18	55	Toronto, Canada	2019-Jul-19	NCCWMA		
60-64 (27")	13.26 (+1.5 m/s)	Phil Raschker	1947-Feb-21	60	Riccione, Italy	2007-Sep-04	World Masters Athletics Championships		
65-69 (27")	14.31 (−1.2 m/s)	Nadine O'Connor	1942-Mar-05	65	Riccione, Italy	2007-Sep-14	World Masters Athletics Championships		
70-74 (27")	17.32 (−2.7 m/s)	Becky Sisley	1939-May-10	70	Oshkosh, Wisconsin	2009-Jul-10	USATF Masters Championships		
75-79 (27")	18.63 (+0.0 m/s)	Flo Meiler	1934-Jun-07	75	Oshkosh, Wisconsin	2009-Jul-09	USATF Masters Championships		
80-84 (27")	18.70 (−0.1 m/s)	Irene Obera	1933-Dec-07	82	Perth, Australia	2016-Nov-04	2016 World Masters Athletics Championships		

=== Women's 100 metres hurdles ===
Age group	Record	Athlete	Birthdate	Age	Place	Date	Meet	Ref.
35-39 (33")	12.40 (+1.2 m/s)	Gail Devers	1966-Nov-19	35	Lausanne, Switzerland	2002-Jul-02	Athletissima	

=== Women's 200 metres hurdles ===
Age group	Record	Athlete	Birthdate	Age	Place	Date	Meet	Ref.
70-74 (27")	41.08 (−0.3 m/s)	Becky Sisley	1939-May-10	70	Lahti, Finland	2009-Aug-02	World Masters Championships	
75-79 (27")	41.71 (−2.2 m/s)	Barbara Jordan	1935-Oct-27	75	Sacramento, California	2011-Jul-11	World Masters Championships	
80-84 (27")	42.24 (+1.2 m/s)	Irene Obera	1933-Dec-07	80	Winston-Salem, North Carolina	2014-Jul-20	USATF Masters Championships	

=== Women's 300 metres hurdles ===
Age group	Record	Athlete	Birthdate	Age	Place	Date	Meet	Ref.
50-54 (30")	46.17	Joy Upshaw	1961-Feb-24	50	Point Loma California	2011-Sep-24		
55-59 (30")	49.14	Phil Raschker	1947-Feb-21	55	Orono, Maine	2002-Aug-11	USATF Masters Championships	
60-64 (27")	48.89	Sue McDonald	1963-Mar-29	60	Greensboro, North Carolina	2023-Jul-20	USA Masters Championships	
65-69 (27")	56.11	Nadine O'Connor	1942-Mar-05	67	Santa Barbara, California	2009-Oct-03	Club West	

=== Women's 400 metres hurdles ===
Age group	Record	Athlete	Birthdate	Age	Place	Date	Meet	Ref.
35-39 (30")	53.32	Sandra Glover	1968-Dec-30	36	Helsinki, Finland	2005-Aug-13	World Championships	
40-44 (30")	63.95	Lisa Daley	1970-Jan-30	41	Sacramento, California	2011-Jul-11	World Masters Championships	
45-49 (30")	65.92	Latrica Dendy	1972-Nov-05	45	Málaga, Spain	2018-Sep-07	World Masters Championships	

=== Women's 2,000 metres steeplechase ===
35-39 (30")	6:30.83	Leslie Lehane	1963-Mar-12	35	Orono, Maine	1998-Jul-31	USATF Masters Championships
40-44 (30")	6:49.58	Lisa Ryan	1969-Nov-06	41	Sacramento, California	2011-Jul-17	World Masters Athletics Championships
45-49 (30")	6:58.89	Lisa Valle	1966-Apr-29	45	Sacramento, California	2011-Jul-17	World Masters Athletics Championships
50-54 (30")	7:59.66	Lisa Valle	1966-Apr-29	51	San Mateo, California	2017-Jun-04	
55-59 (30")	8:13.10	Kathryn Martin	1951-Sep-30	58	Sacramento, California	2010-Jul-23	USATF Masters Championships
60-64 (30")	8:16.93	Sue McDonald	1963-Mar-29	60	Montecito, California	2023-Oct-15	Club West Beverley Lewis Memorial Masters Meet
65-69 (30")	8:52.49	Kathryn Martin	1951-Sep-30	65	Toronto, Canada	2017-Aug-12	NCCWMA
70-74 (30")	10:20.43	Marie-Louise Michelsohn	1941-Oct-08	70	Lisle Illinois	2012-Aug-02	USATF Masters Championships
75-79 (30")	11:30.52	Marie-Louise Michelsohn	1941-Oct-08	76	Santa Barbara California	2018-Sep-30	
80-84 (30")
80-84 (30")	14:34.75	Flo Meiler	1934-Jun-07	80	Albany New York	2014-Jun-21	
80-84 (30")	15:40.78	Tami Graf	1936-Jul-11	81	Worcester, Massachusetts	2018-Jul-7	USATF Masters East Region Championships

=== Women's 4 × 100 metres relay ===
35+	49.04	USA: Maurelhena Walles; Charmaine Roberts; Lisa Daley; Latrica Dendy	1974-Jul-25; 1967-Apr-12; 1970-Jan-30; 1972-Nov-05	Lahti, Finland	2009-Aug-08	World Masters Athletics Championships
35+ Club	52.68	Carolinas TFC: Anne Sluder; Kris Kazebee; Melanie Walker; Toccata Murphy	1972-Sep-17; 1966-Jun-25; 1969-Feb-08; 1969-Oct-10	Lisle, Illinois	2012-Aug-06	USATF National Masters Championships
40+	49.38	USA: Cynthia Monteleone; Rachel Guest; Lisa Edwards; Cynthia McNamee	1976-Feb-25; 1975-Apr-15; 1978-Jun-03; 1975-Oct-26	Málaga, Spain	2018-Sep-16	2018 World Masters Athletics Championships
40+ club	52.21	SW Sprinters TC: Jeanette Rogers; Rachel Guest; Cynthia McNamee; Nedenia West	1974-Mar-16; 1975-Apr-15; 1975-Oct-26; 1968-Aug-09	Baton Rouge, Louisiana	2017-Jul-16	USATF Masters Championships
45+	50.87	U.S.A. Emmanuelle McGowan, Beth Clark, Evelyn Konrad, Joy Upshaw	1968-Jun-14; 1966-May-16; 1967-Apr-10; 1961-Feb-24	Lyon, France	2015-Aug-16	2015 World Masters Athletics Championships
45+ club	53.98	SoCal TC: Menka Scott; Angela Sauer; Sharon Warren; La Shon Nedd-Johnson	1966-Apr-09 unk 1950-Dec-27; 1963-Jun-08	Winston-Salem, North Carolina	2014-Jul-20	USATF Masters Championships
50+	51.88	U.S.A.: Amanda Scotti; Liz Palmer; Kathleen Shook; Joy Upshaw	1957-Dec-08; 1960-Aug-02; 1961-Mar-29; 1961-Feb-24	Sacramento, California	2011-Jul-17	World Masters Athletics Championships
50+ club	56.55	Athena TC: Sandy Lee Triolo; Cheryl Bellaire; Charmaine Roberts; Terri Rath	1962-Mar-11; 1959-Aug-02; 1967-Apr-12; 1963-Dec-03	Philadelphia, Pennsylvania	2017-Apr-28	Penn Relays|
55+	54.05	U.S.A. Sandy Lee Triolo; Adriene Allen; Kathleen Shook; Joy Upshaw	1962-Mar-11; 1961-Oct-15; 1961-Mar-29; 1961-Feb-24	Málaga, Spain	2018-Sep-16	2018 World Masters Athletics Championships
55+ club	55.71	Joy's Jackrabbits: Amanda Scotti; Debra Hoffman; Darla Demitrios; Joy Upshaw	1957-Dec-08; 1959-Nov-23; 1963-Jan-27; 1961-Feb-24	Hayward, California	2018-Jul-07	
60+	58.75	USA: Brenda Matthews; Kathy Jager; Sharon Warren; Marcella Hale-Hall	1949-Jul-01; 1943-Jun-26; 1950-Dec-27; 1950-Nov-22	Sacramento, California	2011-Jul-17	World Masters Athletics Championships |
60+ club	1:01.75	Southern California Striders: Linda Cohn; Jeanne Bowman; Rita Hanscom; Kathy Bergen	1952-Dec-07; 1952-Oct-19; 1954-May-11; 1939-Dec-24	Winston-Salem, North Carolina	2014-Jul-20	USATF Masters Championships
65+	1:09.39	U.S.A. Johnnye Valien; Suste A. Barnes; Shirley Dietderich; Sumi Onodera-Leonard	1925-Jul-24; 1927-nov-18 1926-Oct-25; 1928-Jun-09	Miyazaki, Japan	1993-Oct-17	World Masters Athletics Championships
70+	1:10.19	USA : Irene Obera; Barbara Jordan; Christel Donley; Flo Meiler	1933-Dec-07; 1935-Oct-27; 1935-Jan-20; 1934-Jun-07	Sacramento, California	2011-Jul-17	World Masters Athletics Championships
75+	1:24.88	U.S.A. Sumi Onodera-Leonard; Patricia Peterson; Shirley Dietderich; Leonore McDaniels	1928-Jun-09; 1926-Apr-14; 1926-Oct-25; 1928-Mar-06	San Sebastián, Spain	2005-Sep-03	World Masters Athletics Championships
80+	1:21.06	U.S.A. Christel Donley, Florence Meiler, Fei-Mei Chou, Irene Obera	1935-Jan-20; 1934-Jun-07; 1935-Jan-02; 1933-Dec-07	Lyon, France	2015-Aug-16	2015 World Masters Athletics Championships

=== Women's 4 × 400 metres relay ===
35+	3:52.85	USA: Maurelhena Walles; Lisa Daley; Charmaine Roberts; Latrica Dendy	1974-Jul-25; 1970-Jan-30; 1967-Apr-12; 1972-Nov-05	Sacramento, California	2010-Jul-25	USATF Masters Championships
35+ club	4:17.07	SW Sprinters TC: Angela Myers; Cynthia Monteleone; Rachel Guest; Danelle Readinger	1978-Aug-05; 1976-Feb-25; 1975-Apr-15; 1975-Aug-07	Spokane, Washington	2018-Jul-29	USATF Masters Championships
40+	3:56.27	USA: Charmaine Roberts; Reneé Henderson; Jane Brooker; Jearl Miles Clark	1967-Apr-12; 1964-Jul-01; 1964-May-10; 1966-Sep-04	Philadelphia, Pennsylvania	2008-Apr-25	Penn Relays
40+ Club	4:12.64	Athena TC: Joan Hunter; Lorraine Jasper; Terri Rath; Charmaine Roberts	1963-Aug-25; 1961-Oct-07; 1963-Dec-03; 1967-Apr-12	Philadelphia, Pennsylvania	2007-Apr-27	Penn Relays
45+	4:10.95	U.S.A. Emmanuelle McGowan, Lisa Daley, Evelyn Konrad, Christine Gentile	1968-Jun-14; 1970-Jan-30; 1967-Apr-10; 1970-Feb-18	Lyon, France	2015-Aug-16	2015 World Masters Athletics Championships
45+ club	4:35.18	Mass Velocity TC: Sue McCarthy; Evelyn Konrad; Diane Pomeroy; Beth Clark	1963-Jul- 1967-Apr-10; 1966-Feb-03; 1966-May-16	Winston-Salem, North Carolina	2014-Jul-20	USATF Masters Championships
50+	4:36.85	USA: Marylin Fitzgerald; Barbara Meadows; Jeanne Hoagland; Irene Obera	1935-May-08; 1930-Feb-16; 1936-Sep-16; 1933-Dec-07	Eugene, Oregon	1989-Aug-06	WAVA Championships
50+ Club	4:34.03	Atlanta TC: Debra Hoffman; Lorraine Jasper; Julie Hayden; Cheryl Bellaire	1959-Nov-23; 1961-Oct-07; 1960-Jan-09; 1959-Feb-08	Philadelphia, Pennsylvania	2013-Apr-26	Penn Relays
55+	4:34.12	Atlanta TC: Terri Rath; Julie Hayden; Adriene Allen; Lorraine Jasper	1963-Dec-03; 960-Jan-09; 1961-Oct-15; 1961-Oct-07	Columbia, Maryland	2019-Jun-01	USATF Masters Super Regional
60+	4:56.74	USA: Kemisole Solwazi; Yvette LaVigne; Carolyn Cappetta; Jeanne Daprano	1939-Oct-20; 1940-Jan-30; 1935-Dec-27; 1936-Sep-16	Brisbane, Australia	2001-Jul-14	WAVA Championships
60+ club	5:55.31	Playmakers Elite: Jean Bolley; Ruth Thelen; Carol Levack; Deborah Feltz	unk 1944-Sep-28 unk 1952-Nov-01	Olivet, Michigan	2014-Jun-07	
65+	6:01.47	USA: Kathryn Martin; Mary Trotto; Sabra Harvey; Coreen Steinbach	1951-Sep-30; 1945-Nov-28; 1949-Mar-02; 1951-Apr-14	Perth, Australia	2016-Nov-06	World Masters Athletics Championships
70+	6:26.99	USA: Barbara Jordan; Eve Pell; Mary Harada; Jeanne Daprano	1935-Oct-27; 1937-Apr-09; 1935-Jun-16; 1936-Sep-16	Riccione, Italy	2007-Sep-15	World Masters Athletics Championships
70+ Club	8:40.08	Atlanta TC: Ann Carter; Catherine Radle; Jeanne Daprano; Joyce Hodges-Hite	1942-Jan-16; 1943-Aug-01; 1936-Sep-16; 1937-Apr-14	Winston-Salem, North Carolina	2014-Jul-20	USATF Masters Championships
75+	8:35.60	USA: Patricia Peterson; Nancy Smalley; Louise Adams; Sumi Onodera-Leonard	1926-Apr-14; 1926-Aug-22; 1921-Dec-18; 1928-Jun-09	San Sebastián, Spain	2005-Sep-03	World Masters Athletics Championships
80+	7:59.18	U.S.A. Rose Green, Jean Daprano; Carolyn Langenwalter, Lynne Hurrell	1938-Aug-20; 1936-Sep-16; 1938-Jan-17; 1934-Aug-04	Málaga, Spain	2018-Sep-16	2018 World Masters Athletics Championships

=== Women's 4 × 800 metres relay ===
35+ club	9:25.27	Westchester TC: Charlotte Rizzo; Jennifer Metz; Jessica Reifer; Nora McGrath	1962-Jul-12	New York City, New York	2011-Jul-09	
40+	9:18.33	USA: Grace Padilla; Lisa Ryan; Jennifer Burke; Sonja Friend-Uhl	1971-May-29; 1969-Nov-06 1971-Mar-22	Olathe, Kansas	2013-Jul-14	USATF Masters Championships
40+ club	9:46.22	Athena TC: Terri Cassel; Mary Grene; Lorraine Jasper; Joan Hunter	1961-Aug-15; 1962-Aug-10; 1961-Oct-07; 1963-Aug-25	Orono, Maine	2007-Aug-05	USATF Masters Championships
50+	10:24.21	USA: Beth Shisler; Sarah Allers; Claudette Groenendaal; Lorraine Jasper	1964-May; 1960-Aug-31; 1963-Nov-01; 1961-Oct-07	Winston-Salem, North Carolina	2014-Jul-20	USATF Masters Championships
50+ club	10:45.23	CLUB: Athena TC: Kathy Haubrich; Cheryl Bellaire; Terri Cassel; Lorraine Jasper	1959-Jul-30; 1959-Feb-08; 1961-Aug-15; 1961-Oct-07	Lisle, Illinois	2012-Aug-06	USATF National Masters Championships
60+	12:14.73	USA: Sabra Harvey; Mary Richards; Coreen Steinbach; Kathryn Martin	1949-Mar-02 unk 1951-Apr-14; 1951-Sep-30	Winston-Salem, North Carolina	2014-Jul-20	USATF Masters Championships
60+ club	14:19.94	CLUB: Athena TC: Trenice Mullis Dubrow; Caroline Mather; Terry Ozell; Susan Aderhold	unk unk unk unk	Winston-Salem, North Carolina	2014-Jul-20	USATF Masters Championships

=== Women's High jump ===
35-39	1.95 m (6 ft 4 3/4 in)	Amy Acuff	1975-Jul-14	36	Eugene, Oregon	2012-Jun-30	U.S. Olympic Trials
40-44	1.79 m (5 ft 10 1/4 in)	Amy Acuff	1975-Jul-14	40	Eugene, Oregon	2016-Jul-01	U.S. Olympic Trials
40-44	1.85 m (6 ft 3/4 in)	Amy Acuff	1975-Jul-14	40	Austin, Texas	2015-August-08	all comers track meet
45-49	1.62 m (5 ft 3 3/4 in)	Clare Look-Jaeger	1966-Jul-17	45	Long Beach, California	2011-Sep-18	Self Trancendence Masters Meet
50-54	1.57 m (5 ft 1 3/4 in)	Sue McDonald	1963-Mar-29	50	Pasadena, California	2013-Jun-16	USATF West Region
55-59	1.47 m (4 ft 9 3/4 in)	Phil Raschker	1947-Feb-21	55	Carolina, Puerto Rico	2003-Jul-02	World Masters Athletics Championships
60-64	1.48 m (4 ft 10 1/4 in)	Neriga Jakstiene	1963-Oct-18	55	Albuquerque, United States; Toronto, Canada	2019-Jun-16; 2019-Jul-18	National Senior Games; NCCWMA
65-69
65-69	1.35 m (4 ft 5 in)	Kathy Bergen	1939-Dec-24	65	Long Beach, California	2006-Jun-10	Southern California Striders Meet of Champions
65-69	1.33 m (4 ft 4 1/4 in)	Kathy Bergen	1939-Dec-24	65	Pittsburgh, Pennsylvania	2005-Jun-10	Senior Olympics
70-74	1.30 m (4 ft 3 in)	Kathy Bergen	1939-Dec-24	70	Sacramento, California	2010-Jul-24	USATF Masters Championships
75-79	1.22 m (4 ft 0 in)	Kathy Bergen	1939-Dec-24	75	Pasadena, California	2015-Jun-02	Pasadena Senior Olympics
80-84	1.15 m (3 ft 9 1/4 in)	Kathy Bergen	1939-Dec-24	80	Marble Falls, Texas	2020-Oct-3	
85-89	0.90 m (2 ft 11 1/4 in)	Margaret Hinton	1919-Aug-14	85	San Antonio, Texas	2009-May-22	
85-89	0.90 m (2 ft 11 1/4 in)	Johnnye Valien	1925-Jul-25	85	Berea, Ohio	2011-Jul-31	USATF Masters Championships

=== Women's Pole vault ===
35-39
35-39	4.93 m (16 ft 2 in)	Jennifer Suhr	1982-Feb-04	36	Austin, Texas	2018-Apr-14	Texas Invitational
35-39	4.85 m (15 ft 10 3/4 in)	Jennifer Suhr	1982-Feb-04	36	Eugene, Oregon	2018-May-26	Prefontaine Classic
40-44	3.50 m (11 ft 5 3/4 in)	Stephanie Colby	1977-Sep-29	41	Toronto, Canada	2019-Jul-19	NCCWMA
	3.52 m (11 ft 6 1/2 in) i	Jill Starkey	1971-Mar-07	40	Reno, Nevada	2013-Jan-19	Pole Vault Summit
45-49	3.38 m (11 ft 1 in)	Phil Raschker	1947-Feb-21	47	Atlanta, Georgia	1994-May-17	
50-54	3.25 m (10 ft 7 3/4 in)	Phil Raschker	1947-Feb-21	50	Orlando, Florida	1999-Oct-20	
55-59	3.08 m (10 ft 1 1/4 in)	Kay Glynn	1953-Feb-05	58	Humble, Texas	2011-Jun-20	Senior Olympics
60-64	3.12 m (10 ft 2 3/4 in)	Nadine O'Connor	1942-Mar-05	64	Long Beach, California	2006-Jul-22	USATF West Region Championships
65-69	3.19 m (10 ft 5 1/2 in)	Nadine O'Connor	1942-Mar-05	67	San Diego, California	2009-Jul-17	
70-74	2.95 m (9 ft 8 in)	Nadine O'Connor	1942-Mar-05	70	San Diego, California	2012-Jul-13	
75-79	2.03 m (6 ft 7 3/4 in)	Flo Meiler	1934-Jun-01	76	Valatie, New York	2010-Jul-04	USATF East Region Championships
80-84	1.83 m (6 ft 0 in)	Flo Meiler	1934-Jun-01	80	Albany New York	2014-Jun-21	USATF Adirondack Championships
85-89	1.25 m (4 ft 1 in)	Johnnye Valien	1925-Jul-25	85	Sacramento, California	2011-Jul-08	World Masters Athletics Championships

=== Women's Long jump ===
35-39
35-39	6.80 m (22 ft 3 1/2 in) (+1.3 m/s)	Jackie Joyner Kersee	1962-Mar-03	35	Indianapolis, Indiana	1997-Jun-15	USA Outdoor Track and Field Championships
35-39	6.79 m (22 ft 3 1/4 in) (+0.7 m/s)	Jackie Joyner Kersee	1962-Mar-03	35	Athens, Greece	1997-Aug-09	World Championships
40-44
40-44	5.80 m (19 ft 1/4 in) (+1.0 m/s)	Starlie Graves	1970-Apr-25	42	Houston, Texas	2012-June-14	All Comers Meet
40-44	5.70 m (18 ft 8 1/4 in)	Phil Raschker	1947-Feb-21	40	Raleigh, North Carolina	1987-May-01	Southeastern Masters Meet
40-44	5.68 m (18 ft 7 1/2 in) (+0.4 m/s)	Veronica Amarasekara	1961-Jan-01	42	Eugene, Oregon	2003-Aug-08	USATF Masters Championships
45-49	5.75 m (18 ft 10 1/4 in) i	Phil Raschker	1947-Feb-21	47	Chicago, Illinois	1994-Mar-05	
45-49	5.37 m (17 ft 7 1/4 in) (+1.5 m/s)	Joy Upshaw-Margerum	1961-Feb-24	47	Spokane, Washington	2008-Aug-09	USATF Masters Championships
50-54	5.40 m (17 ft 8 1/2 in) (+1.7 m/s)	Phil Raschker	1947-Feb-21	50	Atlanta, Georgia	1997-Apr-13	
55-59	4.90 m (16 ft 3/4 in) (+1.3 m/s)	Phil Raschker	1947-Feb-21	55	Orono, Maine	2002-Aug-09	USATF Masters Championships
60-64	4.73 m (15 ft 6 in) (+1.8 m/s)	Phil Raschker	1947-Feb-21	60	Louisville, Kentucky	2007-Jul-02	Senior Olympics
65-69	4.26 m (13 ft 11 1/2 in) (+1.5 m/s)	Nadine O'Connor	1942-Mar-05	65	Long Beach, California	2007-May-19	Southern California Striders Meet of Champions
70-74	3.84 m (12 ft 7 in) (+1.1 m/s)	Audrey Lary	1934-May-09	70	Decatur, Illinois	2004-Aug-06	USATF Masters Championships
75-79
75-79	3.62 m (11 ft 10 1/2 in)	Audrey Lary	1934-May-09	75	Chester, Pennsylvania	2009-Jun-06	
75-79	3.55 m (11 ft 7 3/4 in) (+0.0 m/s)	Audrey Lary	1934-May-09	75	Palo Alto, California	2009-Aug-06	Senior Olympics
75-79	3.38 m (11 ft 1 in) (+1.4 m/s)	Leonore McDaniels	1928-Mar-06	75	Pittsburgh, Pennsylvania	2003-May-29	Senior Olympics
75-79	3.33 m (10 ft 11 in) (+1.8 m/s)	Leonore McDaniels	1928-Mar-06	75	Carolina, Puerto Rico	2003-Jul-09	World Masters Athletics Championships
80-84	2.94 m (9 ft 7 1/2 in) (−1.1 m/s)	Irene Obera	1933-Dec-07	80	Winston-Salem, North Carolina	2014-Jul-19	USATF Masters Championships
85-89
85-89	2.32 m (7 ft 7 1/4 in) (+1.6 m/s)	Johnnye Valien	1925-Jul-25	85	Moorpark, California	2011-Oct-23	
85-89	2.21 m (7 ft 3 in) (+1.8 m/s)	Johnnye Valien	1925-Jul-25	85	Sacramento, California	2011-Jul-11	World Masters Athletics Championships
90-94	1.30 m (4 ft 3 in) (+0.0 m/s)	Johnnye Valien	1925-Jul-25	91	Las Vegas, Nevada	2016-Oct-01	

=== Women's Triple jump ===
35-39
35-39	13.48 m (44 ft 2 1/2 in) A (+1.5 m/s)	Robyne Johnson	1963-Aug-22	38	Flagstaff, Arizona	2000-Jul-08	
35-39	13.61 m (44 ft 7 3/4 in) i	Tiombe Hurd	1963-Aug-17	38	Blacksburg, Virginia	2012-Feb-18	
35-39	12.41 m (40 ft 8 1/2 in) (+1.9 m/s)	Tiombe Hurd	1963-Aug-17	35	Sacramento, California	2010-Jul-25	USATF Masters Championships
40-44
40-44	11.80 m (38 ft 8 1/2 in) i	Regina Richardson	1964-Dec-26	40	Chapel Hill, North Carolina	2005-Jan-29	USATF Masters Championships
40-44	11.38 m (37 ft 4 in) (+0.4 m/s)	Cicely Darling	1978-Nov-19	43	Azusa, California	2022-Apr-15	Bryan Clay Invitational
45-49	10.82 m (35 ft 5 3/4 in) i	Phil Raschker	1947-Feb-21	46	Boston, Massachusetts	1993-Mar-19	USATF Masters Indoor Championships
45-49	10.80 m (35 ft 5 in)	Phil Raschker	1947-Feb-21	46	Provo, Utah	1993-Aug-12	USATF Masters Championships
50-54	10.49 m (34 ft 4 3/4 in) (+1.3 m/s)	Phil Raschker	1947-Feb-21	50	Durban, South Africa	1997-Jul-23	WAVA Championships
55-59	10.49 m (34 ft 4 3/4 in) (+1.6 m/s)	Neriga Jakstiene	1963-Oct-18	55	Toronto, Canada	2019-Jul-21	NCCWMA
60-64	9.63 m (31 ft 7 in) (+0.7 m/s)	Phil Raschker	1947-Feb-21	60	Louisville, Kentucky	2007-Jul-03	Senior Olympics
65-69	8.76 m (28 ft 8 3/4 in) i	Phil Raschker	1947-Feb-21	65	Jyväskylä, Finland	2012-Apr-07	World Masters Indoor Championships
65-69	8.53 m (27 ft 11 3/4 in) (+0.0 m/s)	Audrey Lary	1934-May-09	68	Orono, Maine	2002-Aug-11	USATF Masters Championships
70-74	8.23 m (27 ft 0 in) (+2.0 m/s)	Audrey Lary	1934-May-09	74	Spokane, Washington	2008-Aug-10	USATF Masters Championships
75-79
75-79	7.88 m (25 ft 10 in) (+1.3 m/s)	Audrey Lary	1934-May-09	75	Palo Alto, California	2009-Aug-07	Senior Olympics
75-79	7.43 m (24 ft 4 1/2 in) (−2.6 m/s)	Audrey Lary	1934-May-09	75	Oshkosh, Wisconsin	2009-Jul-12	USATF Masters Championships
80-84	5.91 m (19 ft 4 1/2 in) (+0.0 m/s)	Flo Meiler	1934-Jun-07	81	Lyon, France	2015-Aug-6	2015 World Masters Athletics Championships
85-89
85-89	4.55 m (14 ft 11 in) (+0.0 m/s)	Johnnye Valien	1925-Jul-24	85	Sacramento, California	2011-Jul-15	WAVA Championships
85-89	3.77 m (12 ft 4 1/4 in)	Wally Dashiell	1923-Aug-31	87	Columbia, Maryland	2010-Aug-15	Maryland Senior Olympics
90-94
90-94	3.75 m (12 ft 3 1/2 in) i	Mary Elizabeth Norckhauer	1924-Oct-23	91	Baton Rouge, Louisiana	2015-Mar-07	Southwest Regional Indoor Championship
90-94	3.07 m (10 ft 3/4 in)	Mary Elizabeth Norckhauer	1924-Oct-23	93	Baton Rouge, Louisiana	2017-Jul-16	Southwest Region Championship

=== Women's Shot Put ===
35-39 (4 kg.)
35-39 (4 kg.)	19.46 m (63 ft 10 in)	Connie Price-Smith	1962-Jun-03	36	Uniondale, New York	1998-Jul-19	Goodwill Games
35-39 (4 kg.)	19.46 m (63 ft 10 in)	Connie Price-Smith	1962-Jun-03	37	Terre Haute, Indiana	1999-Jun-13	
35-39 (4 kg.)	19.00 m (62 ft 4 in)	Connie Price-Smith	1962-Jun-03	35	Athens, Greece	1997-Aug-07	1997 World Championships in Athletics
35-39 (4 kg.)	17.72 m (58 ft 1 1/2 in)	Michelle Carter	1965-Oct-12	36	Eugene, Oregon	2022-Jun-26	2022 USA Outdoor Track and Field Championships
40-44 (4 kg.)	15.09 m (49 ft 6 in)	Oneithea Lewis	1960-Jun-11	42	Lancaster, Pennsylvania	2002-Jul-17	
45-49 (4 kg.)
45-49 (4 kg.)	14.00 m (45 ft 11 in)	Oneithea Lewis	1960-Jun-11	45	Pomona, New Jersey	2005-Jul-02	USATF East Region Championships
45-49 (4 kg.)	13.55 m (44 ft 5 1/4 in)	Oneithea Lewis	1960-Jun-11	45	Honolulu, Hawaii	2005-Aug-05	USATF Masters Championships
50-54 (3 kg.)	14.65 m (48 ft 3/4 in)	Monica Kendall	1955-Dec-24	50	Gresham, Oregon	2006-Jun-10	Portland Masters Championships
55-59 (3 kg.)	13.27 m (43 ft 6 1/4 in)	Monica Kendall	1955-Dec-24	57	Gresham, Oregon	2013-Jun-22	Portland Masters Championships
60-64 (3 kg.)	12.58 m (41 ft 3 1/4 in)	Monica Kendall	1955-Dec-24	60	Grand Rapids, Michigan	2016-Jul-17	USATF Masters Championships
65-69 (3 kg.)	11.31 m (37 ft 1 1/4 in)	Monica Kendall	1955-Dec-24	65	San Mateo, California	2021-Dec-12	Bay Area Senior Game
70-74
70-74	10.59 m (34 ft 8 3/4 in)	Carol Frost	1945-Mar-8	70	West Des Moines, Iowa	2015-Jun-13	Iowa Senior Games
70-74	10.27 m (33 ft 8 1/4 in)	Carol Frost	1945-Mar-8	70	Lincoln, Nebraska	2015-Aug-02	Cornhusker State Games
75-79 (2 kg.)	8.90 m (29 ft 2 1/4 in)	Elsbeth Padia	1938-Jul-05	79	Santa Rosa, California	2018-Jun-23	
75-79 (3 kg.)	8.21 m (26 ft 11 in)	Christel Donley	1935-Jan-20	75	Sacramento, California	2010-Jul-23	USATF Masters Championships
80-84 (2 kg.)	8.43 m (27 ft 7 3/4 in)	Elsbeth Padia	1938-Jul-05	80	Hayward, California	2018-Jul-7	
80-84 (3 kg.)	7.62 m (25 ft 0 in)	Jean Brubaker	1927-May-23	80	York, Pennsylvania	2008-Mar-08	
80-84 (3 kg.)	7.41 m (24 ft 3 1/2 in)	Mary Bowermaster	1917-Jul-26	80	Dayton	1998-Jul-25	
85-89 (2 kg.)	6.91 m (22 ft 8 in)	Gloria Krug	1931-May-27	85	Grand Rapids Michigan	2016-July 17	USATF Masters Championships
85-89 (3 kg.)	6.52 m (21 ft 4 1/2 in)	Helen Beauchamp	1919-Oct-21	85	Pittsburgh, Pennsylvania	2005-Jun-09	Senior Olympics
90-94 (3 kg.)	4.81 m (15 ft 9 1/4 in)	Margaret Evans	1912	91	Saint Amant, Louisiana	2003-Mar-15	
90-94 (2 kg.)	5.59 m (18 ft 4 in)	Hazel Trexler-Campbell	1922-Dec-21	90	Berea, Ohio	2013-Jul-26	National Senior Games
95-99 (2 kg.)	4.09 m (13 ft 5 in)	Betty Jarvis	1915-Jul-25	95	Lisle, Illinois	2010-Aug-07	USATF Throws Championships
100-104 (2 kg.)	2.77 m (9 ft 1 in) i	Julia Hawkins	1916-Feb	102	Landover, Maryland	2018-Mar-17	USATF Masters Indoor Championships

=== Women's Discus throw ===
35-39
35-39	69.17 m (226 ft 11 in)	Gia Lewis-Smallwood	1979-Apr-01	35	Angers, France	2014-Aug-30	
40-44
40-44	53.28 m (174 ft 9 in)	Carol Finsrud	1957-Feb-20	40	Houston, Texas	1997-May-29	
40-44	52.44 m (172 ft 0 in)	Carol Finsrud	1957-Feb-20	44	Houston, Texas	2001-May-19	
45-49
45-49	51.24 m (168 ft 1 in)	Carol Finsrud	1957-Feb-20	47	Cat Spring, Texas	2004-Jul-10	
45-49	50.85 m (166 ft 9 in)	Carol Finsrud	1957-Feb-20	48	Honolulu, Hawaii	2005-Aug-04	USATF Masters Championships
50-54	45.67 m (149 ft 10 in)	Carol Finsrud	1957-Feb-20	50	Riccione, Italy	2007-Sep-15	World Masters Athletics Championships
55-59
55-59	40.94 m (134 ft 3 in)	Carol Finsrud	1957-Feb-20	56	San Marcos, Texas	2013-May-05	
55-59	40.39 m (132 ft 6 in)	Carol Finsrud	1957-Feb-20	55	Austin, Texas	2012-Jul-28	
60-64	40.76 m (133 ft 8 in)	Carol Finsrud	1957-Feb-20	60	San Marcos, Texas	2017-Oct-14	
65-69	31.04 m (101 ft 10 in)	Carol Frost	1945-Mar-8	65	Lincoln, Nebraska	2012-Jul-21	
70-74
70-74	30.58 m (100 ft 3 in)	Carol Frost	1945-Mar-8	70	West Des Moines, Iowa	2015-Jun-13	Iowa Senior Games
70-74	29.07 m (95 ft 4 in)	Carol Frost	1945-Mar-8	70	Lincoln, Nebraska	2015-Aug-02	Cornhusker State Games
75-79	22.38 m (73 ft 5 in)	Kathy Bergen	1939-Dec-24	75	St. Paul, Minnesota	2015-Jul-09	National Senior Games
80-84 (.75 kg.)	21.14 m (69 ft 4 in)	Madelaine Cazel	1937-Oct-29	82	Albuquerque, New Mexico	2019-Jun-19	National Senior Games
85-89 (.75 kg.)	16.51 m (54 ft 2 in)	Harriet Bloemker	1932-Apr-14	85	Lincoln, Nebraska	2017-Jul-22	
90-94 (1 kg.)	11.56 m (37 ft 11 in)	Juanita Brookover	1915-Apr-02	90	Durham, North Carolina	2005-May-07	
90-94 (.75 kg.)	11.36 m (37 ft 3 in)	Betty Jarvis	1915-Jul-25	92	Riccione, Italy	2007-Sep-09	World Masters Athletics Championships
95-99 (.75 kg.)	10.44 m (34 ft 3 in)	Betty Jarvis	1915-Jul-25	95	Lisle, Illinois	2010-Aug-07	USATF Throws Championships

=== Women's Hammer throw ===
35-39 (4 kg.)
35-39 (4 kg.)	74.03 m (242 ft 10 in)	Amber Campbell	1981-Jun-05	35	Eugene, Oregon	2016-Jul-06	U.S. Olympic Trials
35-39 (4 kg.)	61.29 m (201 ft 0 in)	Leslie Coons	1973-Jul-16	35	Irvine, California	2009-Mar-20	
35-39 (4 kg.)	51.63 m (169 ft 4 in)	Michelle Clayton	1974-Jul-21	38	Jacksonville, Florida	2015-Jul-23	USATF Masters Championships
40-44 (4 kg.)
40-44 (4 kg.)	59.29 m (194 ft 6 in)	Oneithea Lewis	1960-Jun-11	42	Princeton, New Jersey	2003-May-10	
40-44 (4 kg.)	57.08 m (187 ft 3 in)	Oneithea Lewis	1960-Jun-11	44	Reading, Pennsylvania	2005-Jun-04	Philadelphia Masters Throw a Thon
45-49 (4 kg.)	56.21 m (184 ft 4 in)	Oneithea Lewis	1960-Jun-11	45	Denver, Pennsylvania	2005-Jul-16	
50-54 (3 kg.)
50-54 (3 kg.)	55.86 m (183 ft 3 in)	Oneithea Lewis	1960-Jun-11	50	Reading, Pennsylvania	2011-Jun-04	
50-54 (3 kg.)	55.46 m (181 ft 11 in)	Oneithea Lewis	1960-Jun-11	50	Sacramento, California	2010-Jul-22	USATF Masters Championships
55-59 (3 kg.)	49.46 m (162 ft 3 in)	Vanessa Hilliard	1941-Apr-18	55	Naples	1997-Apr-05	
60-64 (3 kg.)	43.54 m (142 ft 10 in)	Vanessa Hilliard	1941-Apr-18	60	Baton Rouge, Louisiana	2001-Jul-28	USATF Masters Championships
65-69 (3 kg.)	40.21 m (131 ft 11 in)	Myrle Mensey	1949-Feb-13	68	Bourbonnais, Illinois	2017-Jun-24	
70-74 (3 kg.)	29.66 m (97 ft 3 in)	Carol Young	1940-Feb-06	70	Berea, Ohio	2011-Jul-28	USATF Masters Championships
75-79 (2 kg.)	30.53 m (100 ft 1 in) A	Joy Kaylor	1938-Jan-09	77	Ft. Collins Colorado	2015-Aug-29	USATF Mid-America Regional Masters Championships
80-84 (2 kg.)	23.23 m (76 ft 2 in)	Elsbeth Padia	1938-Jul-05	80	Málaga, Spain	2018-Sep-5	World Masters Athletics Championships
85-89 (3 kg.)	15.03 m (49 ft 3 in)	Helen Beauchamp	1919-Oct-21	86	Louisville, Kentucky	2007-Jun-26	Senior Olympics
85-89 (2 kg.)	19.75 m (64 ft 9 in)	Gloria Krug	1931-May-27	85	Chelmsford, Massachusetts	2016-Aug-20	
90-94 (2 kg.)	12.50 m (41 ft 0 in)	Wally Dashiell	1923-Aug-31	93	Columbia, Maryland	2017-Aug-12	Maryland Senior Olympics
95-99 (2 kg.)	6.01 m (19 ft 8 in)	Betty Jarvis	1915-Jul-25	95	Lisle, Illinois	2010-Aug-07	USATF Throws Championships

=== Women's Weight throw ===
35-39 (20 lbs.)
35-39 (20 lbs.)	23.48 m (77 ft 0 in) i	Amber Campbell	1981-Jun-05	35	Albuquerque, New Mexico	2017-Mar-04	USATF Indoor Championships
35-39 (20 lbs.)	15.35 m (50 ft 4 1/4 in)	Julie Williams-Tinkham	1980-Jun-	37	Chelmsford, Massachusetts	2018-May-06	
40-44 (20 lbs.)	19.09 m (62 ft 7 1/2 in)	Oneithea Lewis	1960-Jun-11	42	Newark, Delaware	2002-Sep-28	
45-49 (20 lbs.)	17.88 m (58 ft 7 3/4 in)	Oneithea Lewis	1960-Jun-11	45	Arlington, Texas	2005-Aug-13	
50-54 (16 lbs.)	18.76 m (61 ft 6 1/2 in)	Oneithea Lewis	1960-Jun-11	51	Sacramento, California	2011-Jul-11	World Masters Athletics Championships
55-59 (16 lbs.)
55-59 (16 lbs.)	16.79 m (55 ft 1 in)	Vanessa Hilliard	1941-Apr-18	56	Orlando, Florida	1997-Jun-01	
55-59 (16 lbs.)	16.56 m (54 ft 3 3/4 in)	Vanessa Hilliard	1941-Apr-18	56	Orlando, Florida	1997-May-10	
55-59 (16 lbs.)	16.17 m (53 ft 1/2 in)	Oneithea Lewis	1960-Jun-11	58	Worcester Massachusetts	2018-Aug-04	USATF Masters Throws Championships
60-64 (12 lbs.)	17.78 m (58 ft 4 in)	Myrle Mensey	1949-Feb-13	64	Lisle, Illinois	2013-Aug-03	USATF Throws Championships
65-69 (12 lbs.)	17.20 m (56 ft 5 in)	Myrle Mensey	1949-Feb-13	68	Baton Rouge, Louisiana	2017-Jul-15	USATF Masters Championships
70-74 (12 lbs.)
70-74 (12 lbs.)	12.73 m (41 ft 9 in)	Carol Young	1940-Feb-06	71	Berea, Ohio	2011-Jul-30	USATF Masters Championships
70-74 (12 lbs.)	12.53 m (41 ft 1 1/4 in)	Carol Young	1940-Feb-06	70	Lisle, Illinois	2010-Aug-08	USATF Throws Championships
75-79 (4 kg.)	12.03 m (39 ft 5 1/2 in)	Joanne Marriott	1939-Jan-	78	Grass Valley, California	2018-Jun-6	Sierra Gold Masters Track and Field Festival
80-84 (4 kg.)	9.92 m (32 ft 6 1/2 in)	Mary Roman	1935-Sep-02	81	Perth, Australia	2016-Oct-28	World Masters Athletics Championships
85-89 (4 kg.)	8.10 m (26 ft 6 3/4 in) i	Gloria Krug	1931-May-27	85	Daegu, South Korea	2017-Mar-24	World Masters Indoor Athletics Championships
85-89 (4 kg.)	7.98 m (26 ft 2 in)	Gloria Krug	1931-May-27	85	Chelmsford, Massachusetts	2016-Aug-20	Chelmsford Twilight Throwers Meet
90-94 (12 lbs.)	5.40 m (17 ft 8 1/2 in)	Betty Jarvis	1915-Jul-25	90	Arlington, Texas	2005-Aug-13	
95-99 (4 kg.)	5.58 m (18 ft 3 1/2 in)	Betty Jarvis	1915-Jul-25	95	Lisle, Illinois	2010-Aug-07	USATF Throws Championships

=== Women's Superweight throw ===
35-39 (35 lbs.)	10.00 m (32 ft 9 1/2 in)	Julie Williams-Tinkham	1980	37	Worcester, Massachusetts	2017-Aug-05	USATF Masters Throws Championships
40-44 (35 lbs.)	9.18 m (30 ft 1 1/4 in)	Marilyn Coleman		40	Worcester, Massachusetts	2014-Aug-03	USATF Masters Throws Championships
45-49 (35 lbs.)	10.59 m (34 ft 8 3/4 in)	Oneithea Lewis	1960-Jun-11	49	Denver, Pennsylvania	2009-Jul-18	
50-54 (25 lbs.)	12.98 m (42 ft 7 in)	Oneithea Lewis	1960-Jun-11	50	Lisle, Illinois	2010-Aug-08	USATF Throws Championships
55-59 (25 lbs.)	11.04 m (36 ft 2 1/2 in)	Oneithea Lewis	1960-Jun-11	57	Worcester Massachusetts	2017-Aug-05	USATF Masters Throws Championships
60-64 (25 lbs.)	9.99 m (32 ft 9 1/4 in)	Myrle Mensey	1949-Feb-13	60	Nashville, Tennessee	2009-May-23	
60-64 (20 lbs.)	11.87 m (38 ft 11 1/4 in)	Myrle Mensey	1949-Feb-13	62	Edwardsville, Illinois	2011-Oct-01	
65-69 (25 lbs.)	7.68 m (25 ft 2 1/4 in)	Carol Young	1940-Feb-06	65	Eugene, Oregon	2005-Jun-19	Hayward Classic
65-69 (20 lbs.)	11.95 m (39 ft 2 1/4 in)	Myrle Mensey	1949-Feb-13	66	Troy, Missouri	2015-Aug-16	
70-74 (25 lbs.)	5.77 m (18 ft 11 in)	Mary Roman	1935-Sep-30	70	Durham, North Carolina	2006-May-05	Southeastern Masters Meet
70-74 (20 lbs.)	7.60 m (24 ft 11 in)	Carol Young	1940-Feb-06	72	Raleigh, North Carolina	2012-May-11	
75-79 (20 lbs.)	6.51 m (21 ft 4 1/4 in)	Lillian Snaden	1929-Mar-31	79	Raleigh, North Carolina	2008-May-02	Southeastern Masters Meet
75-79 (16 lbs.)	8.18 m (26 ft 10 in) A	Joanne Marriott	1939-Jan	76	Ft. Collins, Colorado	2015-Aug-29	Rocky Mountain Masters
80-84 (25 lbs.)	4.87 m (15 ft 11 1/2 in)	Lillian Snaden	1929-Mar-31	80	Raleigh, North Carolina	2009-May-02	Southeastern Masters Meet
80-84 (16 lbs.)	6.28 m (20 ft 7 in)	Gloria Krug	1931-May-27	82	Lisle, Illinois	2013-Aug-04	USATF Throws Championships
85-89 (20 lbs.)	4.17 m (13 ft 8 in)	Melanie Reske	1921-Jan-31	86	Eugene, Oregon	2007-May-13	Hayward Track Classic
85-89 (16 lbs.)	5.83 m (19 ft 1 1/2 in)	Gloria Krug	1931-May-27	85	Lisle, Illinois	2016-Aug-07	USATF Throws Championships
90-94 (20 lbs.)	3.65 m (11 ft 11 1/2 in)	Betty Jarvis	1915-Jul-25	94	Portland, Oregon	2009-Aug-23	USATF Throws Championships
95-99 (20 lbs.)	3.31 m (10 ft 10 1/4 in)	Betty Jarvis	1915-Jul-25	95	Lisle, Illinois	2010-Aug-07	USATF Throws Championships

=== Women's Javelin throw ===
Age group	Record	Athlete	Birthdate	Age	Place	Date	Meet	Ref.
35-39 (600 g)	68.11 m (223 ft 5 in)	Kara Winger	1986-Apr-10	36	Brussels, Belgium	2022-Sep-2	Memorial Van Damme	
40-44 (600 g)	42.05 m (137 ft 11 in)	Carla Greene	1963-Jul-23	42	Cedarville, Ohio	2005-Sep-05		
45-49 (600 g)	41.57 m (136 ft 4 in)	Monica Kendall	1955-Dec-24	48	Sandy, Oregon	2004-Jun-12		
50-54 (500 g)	44.17 m (144 ft 10 in)	Durelle Schimek	1968-Feb-16	54	Hayward, California	2022-Oct-23	USATF Pacific Master Championships	
50-54 (500 g)	44.18 m (144 ft 11 in)	Monica Kendall	1955-Dec-24	50	Gresham, Oregon	2006-Jul-08	Oregon State Games	
55-59 (500 g)	40.94 m (134 ft 3 in)	Durelle Schimek	1968-Feb-16	56		2024		
60-64 (500 g)	37.50 m (123 ft 0 in)	Linda Cohn	1952-Dec-07	61	Northridge, California	2014-May-02		
60-64 (400 g)	39.16 m (128 ft 5 in)	Linda Cohn	1952-Dec-07	60	Claremont, California	2013-Apr-13		
65-69 (500 g)	37.32 m (122 ft 5 in)	Linda Cohn	1952-Dec-07	65	Los Angeles, California	2018-Apr-13		
70-74 (500 g)
70-74 (500 g)	31.88 m (104 ft 7 in)	Linda Cohn	1952-Dec-07	70	Long Beach, California	2023-Mar-03		
75-79 (400 g)	25.61 m (84 ft 0 in)	Madelaine Cazel	1937-Oct-29	75	Berea, Ohio	2013-Jul-24	National Senior Games	
80-84 (400 g)	20.12 m (66 ft 0 in) A	Elsbeth Padia		80	Albuquerque, United States	2019-Jun-18	National Senior Games	
85-89 (400 g)	18.79 m (61 ft 7 in)	Harriet Bloemker	1932-Apr-14	85	Lincoln, Nebraska	2017-Jul-23		
90-94 (400 g)	10.87 m (35 ft 7 in)	Juanita Brookover	1915-Apr-02	90	Pittsburgh, Pennsylvania	2005-Jun-11	Senior Olympics	
95-99 (400 g)	7.55 m (24 ft 9 in)	Betty Jarvis	1915-Jul-25	95	Lisle, Illinois	2010-Aug-07	USATF Throws Championships	

=== Women's Throws pentathlon ===
35-39	3259* pts.	Joan Stratton	1951-Dec-11	35	Melbourne, Australia	1987-Dec-07	WAVA Championships
35-39		Hammer / Shot put / Discus / Javelin / Weight; 36.84 m (120 ft 10 in) / 11.94 m (39 ft 2 in) / 37.28 m (122 ft 3 in) / 32.44 m (106 ft 5 in)* old javelin / 11.74 m (38 ft 6 in)					
35-39	2841 pts.	Adreana Cano	1975-Mar-13	36	Sacramento, California	2011-Jul-15	World Masters Athletics Championships
35-39		Hammer / Shot put / Discus / Javelin / Weight; 36.62 m (120 ft 1 in) / 9.22 m (30 ft 2 in) / 30.95 m (101 ft 6 in) / 30.03 m (98 ft 6 in) / 10.99 m (36 ft 0 in)					
40-44	4841 pts. A	Oneithea Lewis	1960-Jun-11	43	Fort Collins, Colorado	2003-Aug-23	Rocky Mountain Masters
40-44		Hammer / Shot put / Discus / Javelin / Weight; 53.30m / 14.39m / 45.26m / 32.97m / 18.16m					
45-49	4752 pts.	Oneithea Lewis	1960-Jun-11	45	Arlington, Texas	2005-Aug-13	
45-49		Hammer / Shot put / Discus / Javelin / Weight; 47.21m / 13.51m / 37.09m / 28.97m / 17.88m					
50-54	4800 pts.	Oneithea Lewis	1960-Jun-11	50	Lisle, Illinois	2010-Aug-07	USATF Throws Championships
50-54		Hammer / Shot put / Discus / Javelin / Weight; 55.18m / 13.00m / 35.85m / 23.69m / 17.44m					
55-59	4399 pts.	Oneithea Lewis	1960-Jun-11	58	Chelmsford, Massachusetts	2018-Jul-14	Twilight Throws
55-59		Hammer / Shot put / Discus / Javelin / Weight; 47.58 m (156 ft 1 in) / 11.42 m (37 ft 5 in) / 29.35 m (96 ft 3 in) / 18.19 m (59 ft 8 in) / 15.12 m (49 ft 7 in)					
60-64	5060 pts.	Carol Finsrud	1957-Feb-20	60	Lockhart, Texas	2017-Oct-01	
60-64		Hammer / Shot put / Discus / Javelin / Weight; 42.33m / 10.71m / 40.81m / 23.93m / 15.82m					
60-64	4727 pts.	Carol Finsrud	1957-Feb-20	60	San Marcos, Texas	2017-Oct-15	
60-64		Hammer / Shot put / Discus / Javelin / Weight; 35.47m / 10.40m / 39.34m / 25.01m / 15.15m					
65-69	4780 pts.	Myrle Mansey	1949-Feb-13	67	Lisle, Illinois	2016-Aug-07	USATF Throws Championships
65-69		Hammer / Shot put / Discus / Javelin / Weight; 38.22 m (125 ft 4 in) / 9.19 m (30 ft 1 in) / 25.93 m (85 ft 0 in) / 22.05 m (72 ft 4 in) / 15.87 m (52 ft 0 in)					
70-74	4028 pts.	Cynthia Wyatt	1944-Mar-31	70	Worcester, Massachusetts	2014-Aug-02	USATF Throws Championships
70-74		Hammer / Shot put / Discus / Javelin / Weight; 25.12 m (82 ft 4 in) / 9.03 m (29 ft 7 in) / 24.71 m (81 ft 0 in) / 14.70 m (48 ft 2 in) / 10.21 m (33 ft 5 in)					
75-79	3945 pts. (tab.2014)	Joan Marriott	1939-Jan-	77	Fort Collins, Colorado	2016-Aug-28	Rocky Mountain Masters
75-79		Hammer / Shot put / Discus / Javelin / Weight; 27.04 m (88 ft 8 in) / 7.85 m (25 ft 9 in) / 17.95 m (58 ft 10 in) / 17.61 m (57 ft 9 in) / 11.54 m (37 ft 10 in)					
75-79	3738 pts. (tab.2014)	Joyce Kaylor	1938-Jan-09	75	Fort Collins, Colorado	2013-Aug-25	Rocky Mountain Masters
75-79		Hammer / Shot put / Discus / Javelin / Weight; 26.38 m (86 ft 6 in) / 7.87 m (25 ft 9 in) / 19.44 m (63 ft 9 in) / 15.48 m (50 ft 9 in) / 9.79 m (32 ft 1 in)					
80-84	3766 pts. (tab. 2014)	Gloria Krug	1931-May-27	80	New London, Connecticut	2011-Aug-13	USATF Throws Championships
80-84		Hammer / Shot put / Discus / Javelin / Weight; 20.95 m (68 ft 8 in) / 7.36 m (24 ft 1 in) / 16.84 m (55 ft 2 in) / 15.52 m (50 ft 11 in) / 8.15 m (26 ft 8 in)					
85-89	3992 pts.	Gloria Krug	1931-May-27	80	Chelmsford, Massachusetts	2016-Aug-20	Twilight Throwers
85-89		Hammer / Shot put / Discus / Javelin / Weight; 18.84 m (61 ft 9 in) / 5.96 m (19 ft 6 in) / 15.89 m (52 ft 1 in) / 13.33 m (43 ft 8 in) / 7.98 m (26 ft 2 in)					
90-94	3886 pts.	Margaret Evans	1912	91	Saint Amant, Louisiana	2003-Mar-15	
90-94		Hammer / Shot put / Discus / Javelin / Weight; 8.70 m (28 ft 6 in) / 4.81 m (15 ft 9 in) / 9.44 m (30 ft 11 in) / 9.78 m (32 ft 1 in) / 5.07 m (16 ft 7 in)					
95-99	3765 pts.	Betty Jarvis	1915-Jul-25	95	Lisle, Illinois	2010-Aug-07	USATF Throws Championships
95-99		Hammer / Shot put / Discus / Javelin / Weight; 6.01m / 4.09m / 10.44m / 7.55m / 5.58m					

=== Women's Pentathlon ===
35-39	3585 pts.	Clare Look-Jaeger	1966-Jun-17	39	Honolulu, Hawaii	2005-Aug-04	USATF Masters Championships
	3585 pts.	80m H (wind) / High jump / Shot put / Long jump (wind) / 800m; 15.85 / 1.65m / 10.41m / 5.06m / 2:29.69					
40-44	3529 pts.	Caryl Senn	1961-Nov-28	40	Orono, Maine	2002-Aug-08	USATF Masters Championships
40-44		80m H (wind) / High jump / Shot put / Long jump (wind) / 800m; 13.07 / 1.55m / 9.26m / 4.48m / 2:29.97					
45-49	4254 pts.	Phil Raschker	1947-Feb-21	46	Provo, Utah	1993-Aug-11	USATF Masters Championships
45-49		80m H (wind) / High jump / Shot put / Long jump (wind) / 800m; 12.32 / 1.60m / 7.65m / 5.35m / 2:40.48					
50-54	3876 pts.	Phil Raschker	1947-Feb-21	53	Eugene, Oregon	2000-Aug-10	USATF Masters Championships
50-54		80m H (wind) / High jump / Shot put / Long jump (wind) / 800m; 13.15 / 1.49m / 10.01m / 4.92m / 2:59.42					
55-59	4511 pts.	Phil Raschker	1947-Feb-21	55	Orono, Maine	2002-Aug-08	USATF Masters Championships
55-59		80m H (wind) / High jump / Shot put / Long jump (wind) / 800m; 13.19 / 1.43m / 9.17m / 4.78m / 2:59.24					
60-64	4635 pts.	Phil Raschker	1947-Feb-21	60	Orono, Maine	2007-Aug-02	USATF Masters Championships
60-64		80m H (wind) / High jump / Shot put / Long jump (wind) / 800m; 13.56 / 1.36m / 7.93m / 4.49m / 2:54.05					
65-69	4497 pts.	Nadine O'Connor	1942-Mar-05	67	Oshkosh, Wisconsin	2009-Jul-09	USATF Masters Championships
65-69		80m H (wind) / High jump / Shot put / Long jump (wind) / 800m; 14.26 / 1.28m / 7.96m / 4.18m / 3:32.39					
70-74	3546 pts.	Christel Donley	1935-Jan-20	72	Orono, Maine	2007-Aug-02	USATF Masters Championships
70-74		80m H (wind) / High jump / Shot put / Long jump (wind) / 800m; 18.12 / 1.10m / 7.41m / 2.86m / 4:08.59					
75-79	3979 pts.	Flo Meiler	1934-Jun-01	75	Oshkosh, Wisconsin	2009-Jul-09	USATF Masters Championships
75-79		80m H (wind) / High jump / Shot put / Long jump (wind) / 800m; 18.63 / 1.03m / 6.55m / 2.96m / 4:31.95					

=== Women's Ultraweight pentathlon ===
35-39	4589 pts.	Janine Kuestner		35		2017-Aug-06	USATF Throws Championships
40-44	3497 pts.	Laurie Jinkins		44	Seattle, Washington	2008-Sep-06	USATF Masters Weight and Superweight Championships
45-49	5349 pts.	Oneithea Lewis	1960-Jun-11	49	Portland, Oregon	2009-Aug-23	USATF Throws Championships
50-54	5872 pts.	Oneithea Lewis	1960-Jun-11	50	Lisle, Illinois	2010-Aug-08	USATF Throws Championships
55-59	3764 pts.	Joyce Taylor	1939-Jan-09	58	Seattle, Washington	2008-Sep-06	USATF Masters Weight and Superweight Championships
60-64	4874 pts.	Myrle Mensey	1949-Feb-13	60	Portland, Oregon	2009-Aug-23	USATF Throws Championships
65-69	3517 pts.	Georgia Cutler		65	Seattle, Washington	2008-Sep-06	USATF Masters Weight and Superweight Championships
70-74	3212 pts.	Carol Young	1940-Feb-06	70	Lisle, Illinois	2010-Aug-08	USATF Throws Championships
75-79	3242 pts.	Gloria Krug	1931-May-27	78	Portland, Oregon	2009-Aug-23	USATF Throws Championships
75-79	3634 pts.	Gloria Krug	1931-May-27	78	Lisle, Illinois	2010-Aug-08	USATF Throws Championships

=== Women's Heptathlon ===
35-39 (hs 100)	6921 pts.	Jane Frederick	1952-Apr-07	35	Rome, Italy	1987-Aug-31	1987 IAAF World Championships
35-39 (hs 100)		80m H (wind) / High jump / Shot put / 200m (wind) / Long jump (wind) / Javelin / 800m; 13.65 / 1.78m / 16.30m / 24.69 / 6.33m / 46.62m / 2.13.77					
35-39 (hs 100)	6406 pts.	DeDee Nathan	1968-Apr-20	36	Sacramento, California	2004-Jul-09	U.S. Olympic Trials
35-39 (hs 100)		80m H (wind) / High jump / Shot put / 200m (wind) / Long jump (wind) / Javelin / 800m; 13.64 / 1.75m / 13.94m / 25.27 / 6.12m / 43.29m / 2:21.48					
40-44	5468 pts.	Rachel Guest	1975-Apr-15	40	Lyon, France	2015-Aug-5	2015 World Masters Athletics Championships
40-44		80m H (wind) / High jump / Shot put / 200m (wind) / Long jump (wind) / Javelin / 800m; 11.62 (+2.5 m/s) / 1.61m / 8.87m / 26.04 (+1.8 m/s) / 5.54m (−1.9 m/s) / 31.56m / 2:49.14					
45-49	5324* pts.	Phil Raschker	1947-Feb-21	46	Miyazaki, Japan	1993-Oct-07	WAVA Championships
45-49		80m H (wind) / High jump / Shot put / 200m (wind) / Long jump (wind) / Javelin / 800m; 12.39 (+3.0 m/s) / 1.50m / 7.18m / 27.65 (+0.2 m/s) / 5.15m (+0.0 m/s) / 19.27m / 2:47.89					
45-49	4849 pts.	Caryl Senn-Griffiths	1961-Nov-28	47	Shoreline, Washington	2009-Aug-15	USATF Masters Combined Events Championships
45-49		80m H (wind) / High jump / Shot put / 200m (wind) / Long jump (wind) / Javelin / 800m; 14.05 (−1.5 m/s) / 1.42m / 9.09m / 30.14 (+1.2 m/s) / 4.31m (+0.0 m/s) / 31.03m / 2:38.85					
50-54	5971* pts.	Phil Raschker	1947-Feb-21	51	Grass Valley, California	1999-Jul-03	USATF Masters Combined Events Championships
50-54		80m H (wind) / High jump / Shot put / 200m (wind) / Long jump (wind) / Javelin / 800m; 12.80 (−2.4 m/s) / 1.49m / 9.62m / 26.51 (+1.4 m/s) / 5.04m (+1.9 m/s) / 26.90m* / 2:48.49; * Note: 400g Javelin					
50-54	4865 pts.	Rita Hanscom	1954-May-11	53	Riccione, Italy	2007-Sep-04	World Masters Athletics Championships
50-54		80m H (wind) / High jump / Shot put / 200m (wind) / Long jump (wind) / Javelin / 800m; 14.34 / 1.30m / 9.22m / 28.85 / 4.53m / 25.43m / 3:04.27					
55-59	6141 pts.	Phil Raschker	1947-Feb-21	55	Sheffield, Great Britain	2002-Jul-21	GBR Masters Combined Events Championships
55-59		80m H (wind) / High jump / Shot put / 200m (wind) / Long jump (wind) / Javelin / 800m; 13.27 (−1.1 m/s) / 1.41m / 8.68m / 27.78 (+1.0 m/s) / 4.70m (+2.3 m/s) / 25.33m / 2:52.73					
55-59	6057 pts.	Rita Hanscom	1954-May-11	55	Lahti, Finland	2009-Jul-28	World Masters Athletics Championships
55-59		80m H (wind) / High jump / Shot put / 200m (wind) / Long jump (wind) / Javelin / 800m; 13.68 (+0.1 m/s) / 1.36m / 9.28m / 28.85 (−1.7 m/s) / 4.34m (+1.0 m/s) / 29.01m / 2:41.03					
60-64	5989	Rita Hanscom	1954-May-11	55	Lyon, France	2015-Aug-05	2015 World Masters Athletics Championships
60-64		80m H (wind) / High jump / Shot put / 200m (wind) / Long jump (wind) / Javelin / 800m; 13.50 (−2.1 m/s) / 1.44 m / 7.72 m / 29.30 (−3.9 m/s) / 4.51 m (+1.1 m/s) / 21.93 / 2:59.13					
65-69	4551 pts.	Dorothy Vander Cruyssen		65	Sacramento, California	2011-Jul-06	World Masters Athletics Championships
65-69		80m H (wind) / High jump / Shot put / 200m (wind) / Long jump (wind) / Javelin / 800m; 17.83 (−1.9 m/s) / 1.12 m (3 ft 8 in) / 7.45 m (24 ft 5 1/4 in) / 35.35 (+2.3 m/s) / 3.14 m (10 ft 3 1/2 in) (+2.5 m/s) / 24.26 m (79 ft 7 in) / 3.59.44					
W 70	5310	Becky Sisley	1939-May-10	70	Salem, Oregon	2009-May-30	
W 70		80m H (wind) / High jump / Shot put / 200m (wind) / Long jump (wind) / Javelin / 800m; 17.1 / 1.14m / 6.97m / 37.1 / 3.22m / 27.40m / 4:37.9					
W 75	5416	Christel Donley	1935-Jan-20	75	Joplin, Missouri	2010-Jun-19	USATF National Decathlon / Heptathlon Championships
W 75		80m H (wind) / High jump / Shot put / 200m (wind) / Long jump (wind) / Javelin / 800m; 19.88 (+2.1 m/s) / 1.09m / 7.33m / 40.68 (−0.3 m/s) / 2.92m (+1.2 m/s) / 18.82m / 4:35.67					
W 80	4623	Flo Meiler	1934-Jun-01	81	Lyon, France	2015-Aug-16	2015 World Masters Athletics Championships
W 80		80m H (wind) / High jump / Shot put / 200m (wind) / Long jump (wind) / Javelin / 800m; 20.44 (+2.0 m/s) / 0.95m / 6.65m / 44.68 (−0.2 m/s) / 2.79m (+0.4 m/s) / 10.90m / 4:54.65					

=== Women's Decathlon ===
40-44	4949 pts.	Susan Wiemer		43	Shoreline, Washington	2009-Aug-15	USATF Masters Combined Events Championships
40-44	100m (wind) / Discus / Pole vault / Javelin / 400m / 80m H (wind) / Long jump (wind) / Shot put / High jump / 1500m; 14.51 (+0.0 m/s) / 20.92m / 2.30m / 16.55m / 1:10.56 / 16.20 (−1.0 m/s) / 4.17m (+0.1 m/s) / 8.81m / 1.36m / 5:56.76						
45-49	6122 pts.	Caryl Senn-Griffiths	1961-Nov-28	48	Joplin, Missouri	2010-Jun-19	
45-49	100m (wind) / Discus / Pole vault / Javelin / 400m / 80m H (wind) / Long jump (wind) / Shot put / High jump / 1500m; 14.19 (+1.9 m/s) / 26.17m / 2.20m / 32.47m / 1:09.54 / 13.82 (+1.4 m/s) / 4.22m (+0.2 m/s) / 8.65m / 1.40m / 6:03.05						
50-54	7327 pts.	Rita Hanscom	1954-May-11	52	Shoreline, Washington	2006-Jul-15	USATF Masters Combined Events Championships
50-54	100m (wind) / Discus / Pole vault / Javelin / 400m / 80m H (wind) / Long jump (wind) / Shot put / High jump / 1500m; 14.02 / 24.35m / 2.50m / 22.83m / 1:10.49 / 14.73 / 4.43m / 9.25m / 1.39m / 6:16.36						
55-59	8899 pts.	Rita Hanscom	1954-May-11	55	Shoreline, Washington	2009-Aug-15	USATF Masters Combined Events Championships
55-59	100m (wind) / Discus / Pole vault / Javelin / 400m / 80m H (wind) / Long jump (wind) / Shot put / High jump / 1500m; 13.94 (−0.5 m/s) / 21.73m / 2.70m / 26.41m / 1:10.01 / 13.94 (−0.4 m/s) / 4.67m (+0.7 m/s) / 9.34m / 1.36m / 5:56.97						
60-64	8464 pts.	Nadine O'Connor	1942-Mar-05	64	Shoreline, Washington	2006-Jul-15	USATF Masters Combined Events Championships
60-64	100m (wind) / Discus / Pole vault / Javelin / 400m / 80m H (wind) / Long jump (wind) / Shot put / High jump / 1500m; 14.29 / 15.14m / 3.00m / 15.72m / 1:13.95 / 15.11 / 4.35m / 7.19m / 1.21m / 7:26.69						
65-69	10234 pts.	Nadine O'Connor	1942-Mar-05	67	Shoreline, Washington	2009-Aug-15	USATF Masters Combined Events Championships
65-69	100m (wind) / Discus / Pole vault / Javelin / 400m / 80m H (wind) / Long jump (wind) / Shot put / High jump / 1500m; 14.70 (−0.5 m/s) / 21.73m / 3.05m / 18.15m / 1:19.28 / 19.34 (−0.4 m/s) / 4.23m (+1.0 m/s) / 7.87m / 1.27m / 7:35.18						
