= 2011 World Masters Athletics Championships =

Coordinates: 38.556°N 121.423°W

- Dates: 6–17 July 2011
- Host city: Sacramento, United States
- Venue: Hornet Stadium
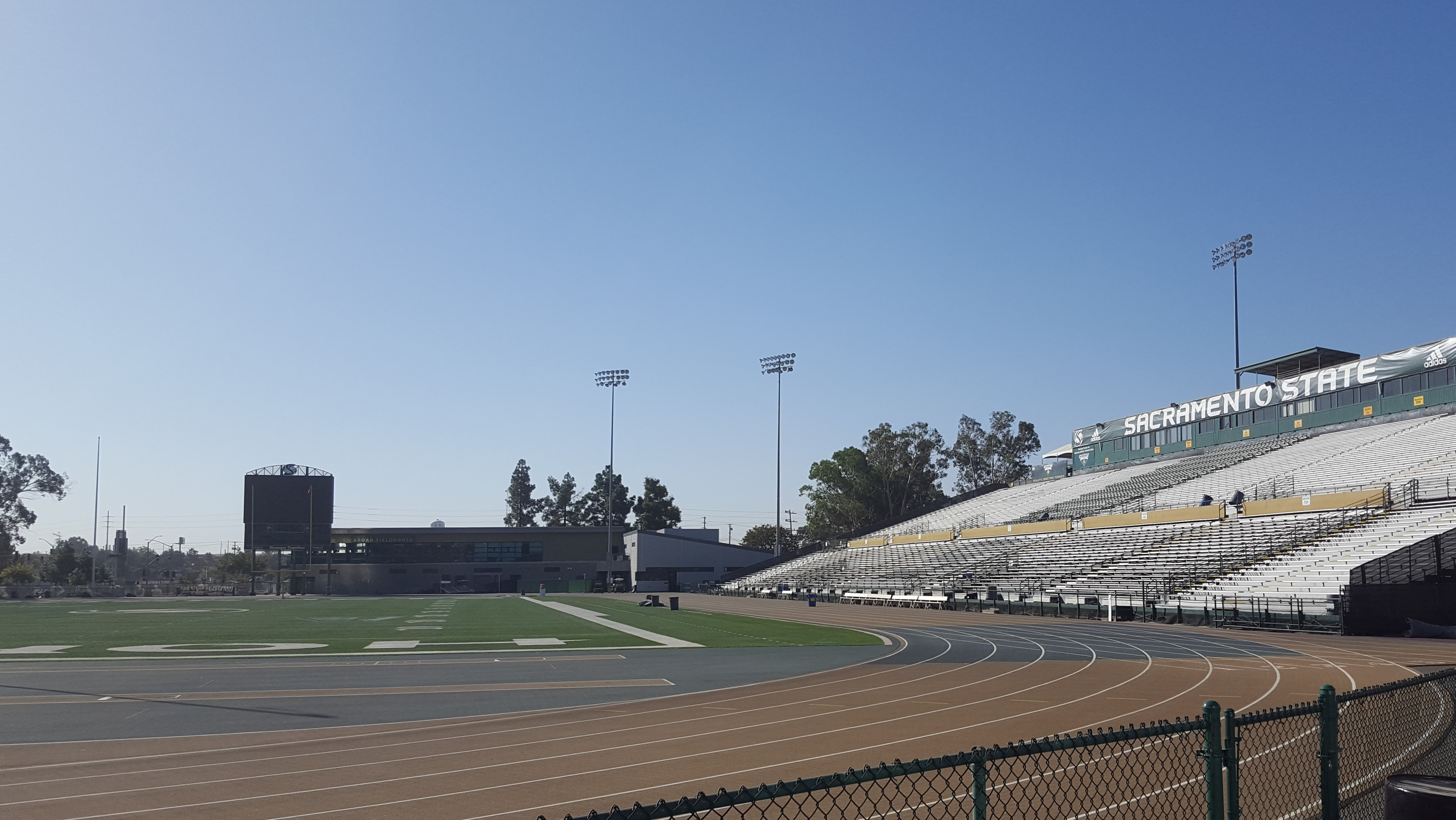
- Level: Masters
- Type: Outdoor
- Participation: 4761 athletes from 93 nations
- Official website: Archived 2011-07-27 at the Wayback Machine

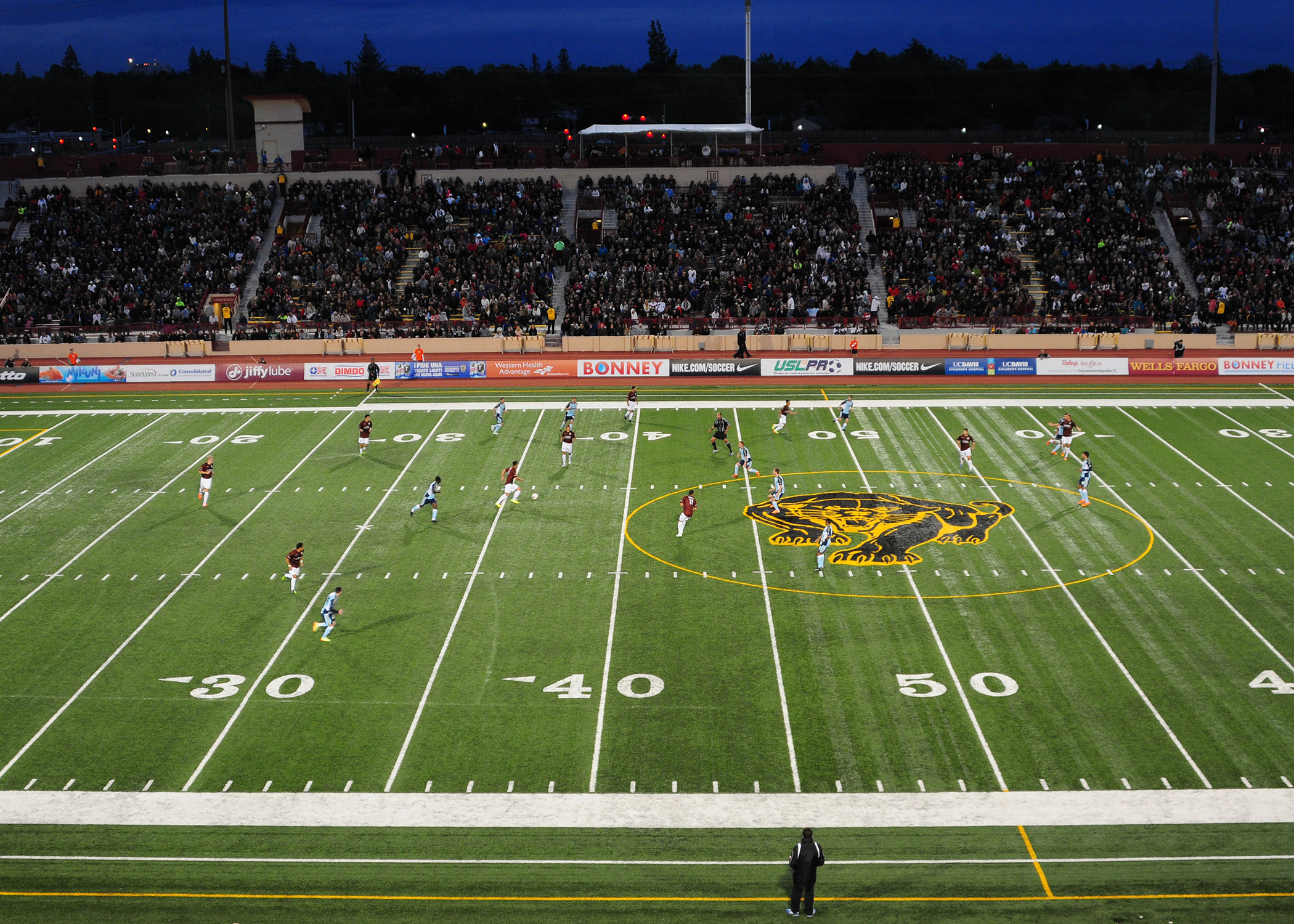
Charles C Hughes Stadium

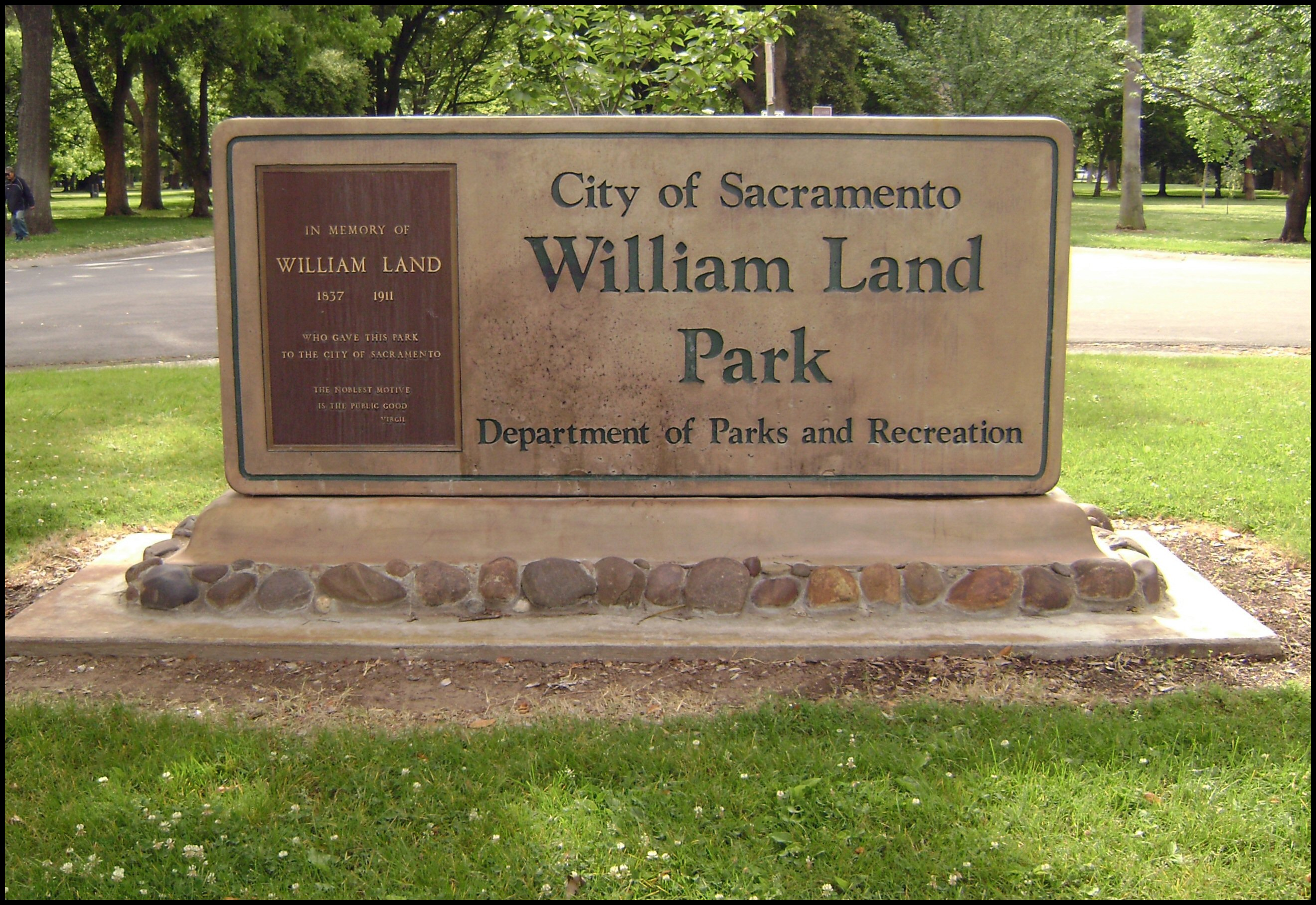
William Land Park

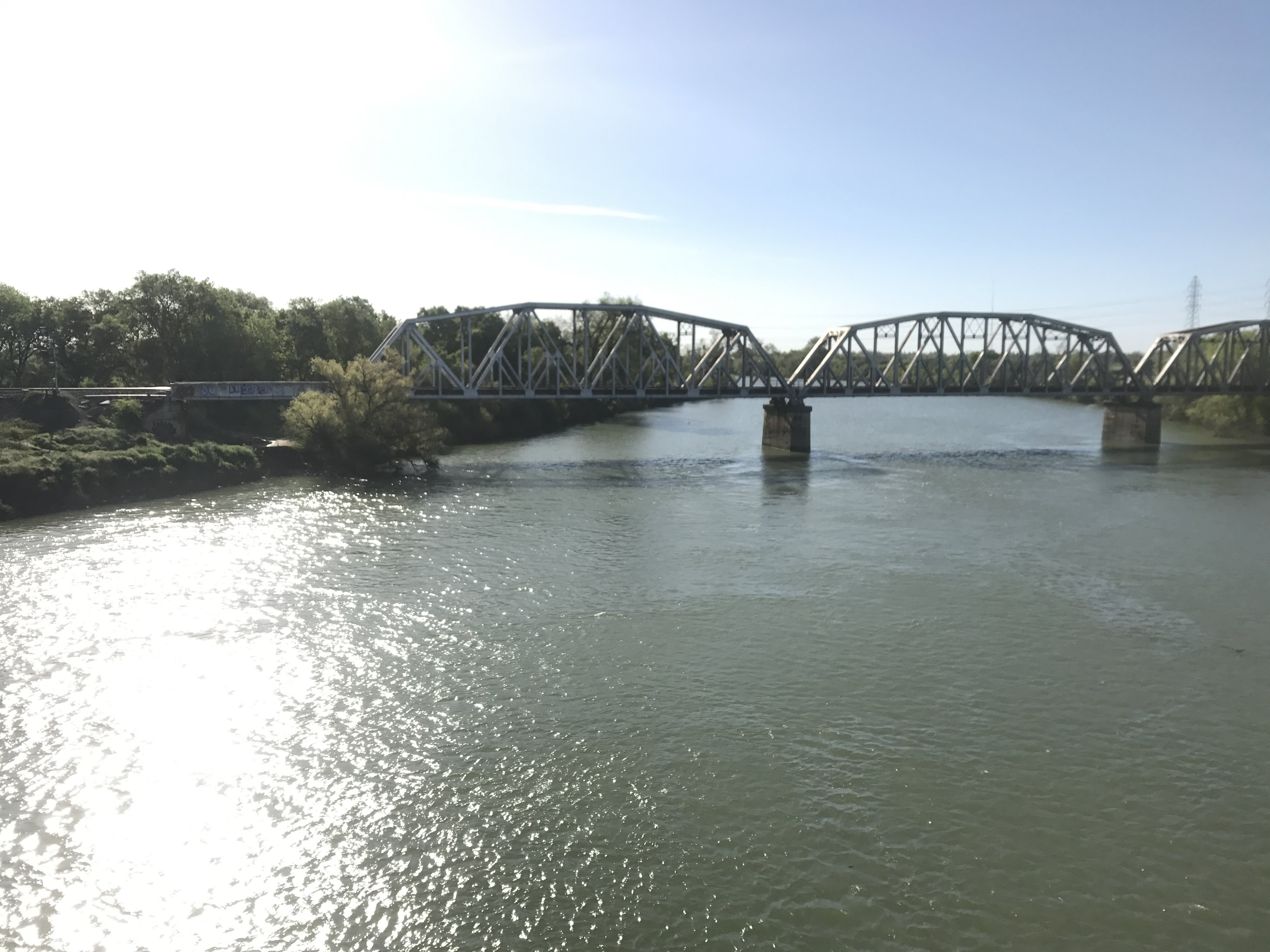
American River

2011 World Masters Athletics Championships is the nineteenth in a series of World Masters Athletics Outdoor Championships that took place in Sacramento, United States from 6 to 17 July 2011.

The primary stadium was Hornet Stadium (Sacramento State Stadium) on the campus of Sacramento State University, which had hosted the U.S. Olympic Trials for track and field in 2000 and 2004. Supplemental venues included Charles C. Hughes Stadium, Beaver Stadium at American River College, Granite Regional Park for Cross Country, William Land Park for Road Walks and American River Parkway for Marathon.

This Championships was organized by World Masters Athletics (WMA) in coordination with a Local Organising Committee (LOC) led by John McCasey.

The WMA is the global governing body of the sport of athletics for athletes 35 years of age or older, setting rules for masters athletics competition.

In addition to a full range of track and field events, non-stadia events included 8K cross country, 10K race walk, 20K race walk, and Marathon.

== Results ==
Official results are archived at flashresults. Past Championships results are archived at WMA. Additional archives are available from British Masters Athletic Federation as searchable pdf files for women and for men, and from Museum of Masters Track & Field as a searchable pdf.

Top medal winners are listed only for selected events. Masters world records set at this Championships are indicated by WR .

=== 100 meters ===
All finals held on July 9, 2011

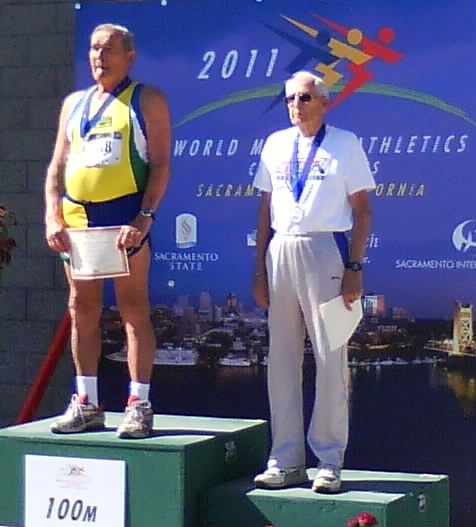
Frederico Fischer and Jim Manno on the awards stand

| Event | Pos | Athlete | Country | Result |
|---|---|---|---|---|
W35 100 meters Wind: +0.9
| W35 100 meters Wind: +0.9 | 1st place, gold medalist(s) | Dena Birade | United States | 12.36 |
| W35 100 meters Wind: +0.9 | 2nd place, silver medalist(s) | Julia Hubbard | Great Britain | 12.44 |
| W35 100 meters Wind: +0.9 | 3rd place, bronze medalist(s) | Emilia Paunica | Spain | 12.44 |
| W35 100 meters Wind: +0.9 | 7 | April Jace | United States | 13.41 |
W40 100 meters Wind: -0.8
| W40 100 meters Wind: -0.8 | 1st place, gold medalist(s) | Donna Lawrence | United States | 12.82 |
| W40 100 meters Wind: -0.8 | 2nd place, silver medalist(s) | Jacqualine Bezuidenhout | Australia | 12.97 |
| W40 100 meters Wind: -0.8 | 3rd place, bronze medalist(s) | Toccata Murphy | United States | 13.14 |
W45 100 meters Wind: -2.0
| W45 100 meters Wind: -2.0 | 1st place, gold medalist(s) | Renee Henderson | United States | 12.36 |
| W45 100 meters Wind: -2.0 | 2nd place, silver medalist(s) | Maryvonne Icarre | France | 12.47 |
| W45 100 meters Wind: -2.0 | 3rd place, bronze medalist(s) | Julie Brims | Australia | 12.56 |
W50 100 meters Wind: -1.5
| W50 100 meters Wind: -1.5 | 1st place, gold medalist(s) | Joy Upshaw | United States | 12.95 |
| W50 100 meters Wind: -1.5 | 2nd place, silver medalist(s) | Liz Palmer | United States | 13.09 |
| W50 100 meters Wind: -1.5 | 3rd place, bronze medalist(s) | Nicole Alexis | France | 13.22 |
W55 100 meters Wind: -1.1
| W55 100 meters Wind: -1.1 | 1st place, gold medalist(s) | Wendy Alexis | Canada | 13.81 |
| W55 100 meters Wind: -1.1 | 2nd place, silver medalist(s) | Tilly Jacobs | Netherlands | 14.00 |
| W55 100 meters Wind: -1.1 | 3rd place, bronze medalist(s) | Caroline Powell | Great Britain | 14.07 |
W60 100 meters Wind: -1.7
| W60 100 meters Wind: -1.7 | 1st place, gold medalist(s) | Sharon Warren | United States | 14.53 |
| W60 100 meters Wind: -1.7 | 2nd place, silver medalist(s) | Brenda Matthews | United States | 14.63 |
| W60 100 meters Wind: -1.7 | 3rd place, bronze medalist(s) | Terhi Kokkonen | Finland | 15.23 |
W65 100 meters Wind: -1.8
| W65 100 meters Wind: -1.8 | 1st place, gold medalist(s) | Carol LaFayette-Boyd | Canada | 15.00 |
| W65 100 meters Wind: -1.8 | 2nd place, silver medalist(s) | Kathy Jager | United States | 15.09 |
| W65 100 meters Wind: -1.8 | 3rd place, bronze medalist(s) | Aletta Ungerer | South Africa | 15.36 |
W70 100 meters Wind: +0.5
| W70 100 meters Wind: +0.5 | 1st place, gold medalist(s) | Kathy Bergen | United States | 14.90 |
| W70 100 meters Wind: +0.5 | 2nd place, silver medalist(s) | Christa Bortignon | Canada | 16.57 |
| W70 100 meters Wind: +0.5 | 3rd place, bronze medalist(s) | Noriko Nakamura | Japan | 16.57 |
W75 100 meters Wind: 0.0
| W75 100 meters Wind: 0.0 | 1st place, gold medalist(s) | Irene Obera | United States | 16.09 |
| W75 100 meters Wind: 0.0 | 2nd place, silver medalist(s) | Barbara Jordan | United States | 16.49 |
| W75 100 meters Wind: 0.0 | 3rd place, bronze medalist(s) | Margaret Peters | New Zealand | 16.98 |
W80 100 meters Wind: 0.0
| W80 100 meters Wind: 0.0 | 1st place, gold medalist(s) | Ernestina Ramirez | Mexico | 18.83 |
| W80 100 meters Wind: 0.0 | 2nd place, silver medalist(s) | Rosemarie Kreiskott | Germany | 18.91 |
| W80 100 meters Wind: 0.0 | 3rd place, bronze medalist(s) | Austra Reinberga | Latvia | 19.37 |
W85 100 meters Wind: -0.1
| W85 100 meters Wind: -0.1 | 1st place, gold medalist(s) | Patricia Peterson | United States | 22.30 |
| W85 100 meters Wind: -0.1 | 2nd place, silver medalist(s) | Johnnye Valien | United States | 23.51 |
| W85 100 meters Wind: -0.1 | 3rd place, bronze medalist(s) | Emilia De Garcia | Colombia | 24.69 |
W90 100 meters Wind: -0.1
| W90 100 meters Wind: -0.1 | 1st place, gold medalist(s) | Olga Kotelko | Canada | 27.56 |
| W90 100 meters Wind: -0.1 | 2nd place, silver medalist(s) | Mavda Ramirez Banue | Mexico | 39.18 |
W95 100 meters Wind: -0.1
| W95 100 meters Wind: -0.1 | 1st place, gold medalist(s) | Man Kaur | India | 1:01.90 WR |
M35 100 meters Wind: +1.1
| M35 100 meters Wind: +1.1 | 1st place, gold medalist(s) | Samba Niangane | France | 10.98 (Revised) |
| M35 100 meters Wind: +1.1 | 2nd place, silver medalist(s) | Albert St. Louis | Trinidad and Tobago | 10.99 |
| M35 100 meters Wind: +1.1 | 3rd place, bronze medalist(s) | Jim Tipper | Great Britain | 11.11 |
M40 100 meters Wind: 0.0
| M40 100 meters Wind: 0.0 | 1st place, gold medalist(s) | Mark Dunwell | Great Britain | 11.03 (11.023 ) |
| M40 100 meters Wind: 0.0 | 2nd place, silver medalist(s) | Reginald Pendland | United States | 11.03 (11.028 ) |
| M40 100 meters Wind: 0.0 | 3rd place, bronze medalist(s) | Anthony Prior | United States | 11.14 |
M45 100 meters Wind: -0.9
| M45 100 meters Wind: -0.9 | 1st place, gold medalist(s) | Mauro Graziano | Italy | 11.29 |
| M45 100 meters Wind: -0.9 | 2nd place, silver medalist(s) | Aaron Thigpen | United States | 11.38 |
| M45 100 meters Wind: -0.9 | 3rd place, bronze medalist(s) | Lonnie Hooker | United States | 11.47 |
M50 100 meters Wind: -0.5
| M50 100 meters Wind: -0.5 | 1st place, gold medalist(s) | Willie Gault | United States | 10.96 |
| M50 100 meters Wind: -0.5 | 2nd place, silver medalist(s) | Kenneth Eaton | United States | 11.60 |
| M50 100 meters Wind: -0.5 | 3rd place, bronze medalist(s) | Pat Logan | Great Britain | 11.62 |
M55 100 meters Wind: -1.4
| M55 100 meters Wind: -1.4 | 1st place, gold medalist(s) | Oscar Peyton | United States | 11.89 |
| M55 100 meters Wind: -1.4 | 2nd place, silver medalist(s) | Damien Leake | United States | 12.01 |
| M55 100 meters Wind: -1.4 | 3rd place, bronze medalist(s) | Kevin Morning | United States | 12.02 |
M60 100 meters Wind: -1.7
| M60 100 meters Wind: -1.7 | 1st place, gold medalist(s) | Ralph Peterson | United States | 12.56 |
| M60 100 meters Wind: -1.7 | 2nd place, silver medalist(s) | Thaddeus Wilson | United States | 12.59 |
| M60 100 meters Wind: -1.7 | 3rd place, bronze medalist(s) | Charles Allie | United States | 12.72 |
M65 100 meters Wind: +0.2
| M65 100 meters Wind: +0.2 | 1st place, gold medalist(s) | Stephen Robbins | United States | 12.77 |
| M65 100 meters Wind: +0.2 | 2nd place, silver medalist(s) | Kenton Brown | United States | 12.95 |
| M65 100 meters Wind: +0.2 | 3rd place, bronze medalist(s) | Stanley Whitley | United States | 13.03 |
M70 100 meters Wind: -0.1
| M70 100 meters Wind: -0.1 | 1st place, gold medalist(s) | Albert Williams | United States | 13.35 |
| M70 100 meters Wind: -0.1 | 2nd place, silver medalist(s) | Eugene Mocka | France | 14.06 |
| M70 100 meters Wind: -0.1 | 3rd place, bronze medalist(s) | Arno Hamaekers | Germany | 14.18 |
M75 100 meters Wind: -0.3
| M75 100 meters Wind: -0.3 | 1st place, gold medalist(s) | Hugh Coogan | Australia | 14.12 |
| M75 100 meters Wind: -0.3 | 2nd place, silver medalist(s) | Robert Cozens | United States | 14.42 |
| M75 100 meters Wind: -0.3 | 3rd place, bronze medalist(s) | Jostein Haraldseid | Norway | 14.49 |
M80 100 meters Wind: 0.0
| M80 100 meters Wind: 0.0 | 1st place, gold medalist(s) | Hiroo Tanaka | Japan | 14.70 |
| M80 100 meters Wind: 0.0 | 2nd place, silver medalist(s) | Yoshiyuki Shimizu | Brazil | 15.33 |
| M80 100 meters Wind: 0.0 | 3rd place, bronze medalist(s) | Felix Hoppe | Germany | 16.20 |
M85 100 meters Wind: -0.9
| M85 100 meters Wind: -0.9 | 1st place, gold medalist(s) | Hugo Ant Delgado Flores | Peru | 17.07 |
| M85 100 meters Wind: -0.9 | 2nd place, silver medalist(s) | Mamoru Ussami | Brazil | 18.19 |
| M85 100 meters Wind: -0.9 | 3rd place, bronze medalist(s) | Santiago Mata Sanchez | Mexico | 18.93 |
M90 100 meters Wind: -2.3
| M90 100 meters Wind: -2.3 | 1st place, gold medalist(s) | Frederico Fischer | Brazil | 19.19 |
| M90 100 meters Wind: -2.3 | 2nd place, silver medalist(s) | Jim Manno | United States | 19.33 |
| M90 100 meters Wind: -2.3 | 3rd place, bronze medalist(s) | Ugo Sansonetti | Italy | 19.39 |
M95 100 meters Wind: -2.3
| M95 100 meters Wind: -2.3 | 1st place, gold medalist(s) | António Fonseca | Brazil | 26.27 |
| M95 100 meters Wind: -2.3 | 2nd place, silver medalist(s) | Leland McPhie | United States | 28.05 |

=== 200 meters ===
All finals held on July 12, 2011

| Event | Pos | Athlete | Country | Result |
|---|---|---|---|---|
W35 200 meters Wind: -0.4
| W35 200 meters Wind: -0.4 | 1st place, gold medalist(s) | Julia Hubbard | Great Britain | 25.50 |
| W35 200 meters Wind: -0.4 | 2nd place, silver medalist(s) | Dena Birade | United States | 25.51 |
| W35 200 meters Wind: -0.4 | 3rd place, bronze medalist(s) | Emilia Paunica | Spain | 25.57 |
W40 200 meters Wind: -0.6
| W40 200 meters Wind: -0.6 | 1st place, gold medalist(s) | Lisa Daley | United States | 26.16 |
| W40 200 meters Wind: -0.6 | 2nd place, silver medalist(s) | Jacqualine Bezuidenhout | Australia | 26.71 |
| W40 200 meters Wind: -0.6 | 3rd place, bronze medalist(s) | Monica Garcia | Mexico | 27.46 |
W45 200 meters Wind: +0.0
| W45 200 meters Wind: +0.0 | 1st place, gold medalist(s) | Maryvonne Icarre | France | 25.05 |
| W45 200 meters Wind: +0.0 | 2nd place, silver medalist(s) | Renee Henderson | United States | 25.28 |
| W45 200 meters Wind: +0.0 | 3rd place, bronze medalist(s) | Julie Brims | Australia | 25.65 |
W50 200 meters Wind: -0.7
| W50 200 meters Wind: -0.7 | 1st place, gold medalist(s) | Joy Upshaw | United States | 26.54 |
| W50 200 meters Wind: -0.7 | 2nd place, silver medalist(s) | Nicole Alexis | France | 27.35 |
| W50 200 meters Wind: -0.7 | 3rd place, bronze medalist(s) | Julie Forster | Australia | 27.50 |
W55 200 meters Wind: -2.6
| W55 200 meters Wind: -2.6 | 1st place, gold medalist(s) | Wendy Alexis | Canada | 28.66 |
| W55 200 meters Wind: -2.6 | 2nd place, silver medalist(s) | Caroline Powell | Great Britain | 29.23 |
| W55 200 meters Wind: -2.6 | 3rd place, bronze medalist(s) | Joan Trimble | Great Britain | 29.80 |
W60 200 meters Wind: -0.1
| W60 200 meters Wind: -0.1 | 1st place, gold medalist(s) | Sharon Warren | United States | 30.30 |
| W60 200 meters Wind: -0.1 | 2nd place, silver medalist(s) | Kathryn Heagney | Australia | 30.56 |
| W60 200 meters Wind: -0.1 | 3rd place, bronze medalist(s) | Wilma Perkins | Australia | 31.39 |
W65 200 meters Wind: +1.6
| W65 200 meters Wind: +1.6 | 1st place, gold medalist(s) | Carol LaFayette-Boyd | Canada | 31.05 |
| W65 200 meters Wind: +1.6 | 2nd place, silver medalist(s) | Marge Allison | Australia | 31.40 |
| W65 200 meters Wind: +1.6 | 3rd place, bronze medalist(s) | Aletta Ungerer | South Africa | 31.78 |
W70 200 meters Wind: +0.9
| W70 200 meters Wind: +0.9 | 1st place, gold medalist(s) | Kathy Bergen | United States | 32.23 |
| W70 200 meters Wind: +0.9 | 2nd place, silver medalist(s) | Noriko Nakamura | Japan | 35.14 |
| W70 200 meters Wind: +0.9 | 3rd place, bronze medalist(s) | Anne Stobaus | Australia | 35.18 |
W75 200 meters Wind: -0.1
| W75 200 meters Wind: -0.1 | 1st place, gold medalist(s) | Irene Obera | United States | 34.82 |
| W75 200 meters Wind: -0.1 | 2nd place, silver medalist(s) | Barbara Jordan | United States | 35.80 |
| W75 200 meters Wind: -0.1 | 3rd place, bronze medalist(s) | Margaret Peters | New Zealand | 36.90 |
W80 200 meters Wind: -0.4
| W80 200 meters Wind: -0.4 | 1st place, gold medalist(s) | Rosemarie Kreiskott | Germany | 41.69 |
| W80 200 meters Wind: -0.4 | 2nd place, silver medalist(s) | Ernestina Ramirez | Mexico | 42.74 |
| W80 200 meters Wind: -0.4 | 3rd place, bronze medalist(s) | Austra Reinberga | Latvia | 44.22 |
W85 200 meters Wind: -0.4
| W85 200 meters Wind: -0.4 | 1st place, gold medalist(s) | Patricia Peterson | United States | 51.43 |
| W85 200 meters Wind: -0.4 | 2nd place, silver medalist(s) | Emilia Garcia De Fontan | Colombia | 54.18 |
W90 200 meters Wind: -0.4
| W90 200 meters Wind: -0.4 | 1st place, gold medalist(s) | Olga Kotelko | Canada | 1:02.48 |
W95 200 meters Wind: -0.4
| W95 200 meters Wind: -0.4 | 1st place, gold medalist(s) | Man Kaur | India | 2:29.90 WR |
M35 200 meters Wind: +1.3
| M35 200 meters Wind: +1.3 | 1st place, gold medalist(s) | Antwon Dussett | United States | 21.57 |
| M35 200 meters Wind: +1.3 | 2nd place, silver medalist(s) | Samba Niangane | France | 22.32 |
| M35 200 meters Wind: +1.3 | 3rd place, bronze medalist(s) | Brian O. Jorgensen | Denmark | 22.41 |
M40 200 meters Wind: -0.5
| M40 200 meters Wind: -0.5 | 1st place, gold medalist(s) | Darren Scott | Great Britain | 22.20 |
| M40 200 meters Wind: -0.5 | 2nd place, silver medalist(s) | Mark Dunwell | Great Britain | 22.79 |
| M40 200 meters Wind: -0.5 | 3rd place, bronze medalist(s) | Eric Prince | United States | 22.82 |
M45 200 meters Wind: +0.3
| M45 200 meters Wind: +0.3 | 1st place, gold medalist(s) | Khalid Mulazim | United States | 23.09 |
| M45 200 meters Wind: +0.3 | 2nd place, silver medalist(s) | Mauro Graziano | Italy | 23.33 |
| M45 200 meters Wind: +0.3 | 3rd place, bronze medalist(s) | Johnny Speed | United States | 23.74 |
M50 200 meters Wind: -0.4 Video on YouTube
| M50 200 meters Wind: -0.4 Video on YouTube | 1st place, gold medalist(s) | Michael Sullivan | United States | 23.36 |
| M50 200 meters Wind: -0.4 Video on YouTube | 2nd place, silver medalist(s) | Pat Logan | Great Britain | 23.65 |
| M50 200 meters Wind: -0.4 Video on YouTube | 3rd place, bronze medalist(s) | Michael Waller | United States | 23.87 |
M55 200 meters Wind: -0.4
| M55 200 meters Wind: -0.4 | 1st place, gold medalist(s) | Oscar Peyton | United States | 24.17 |
| M55 200 meters Wind: -0.4 | 2nd place, silver medalist(s) | Kevin Morning | United States | 24.58 |
| M55 200 meters Wind: -0.4 | 3rd place, bronze medalist(s) | Mark Davis | United States | 25.25 |
M60 200 meters Wind: -0.1
| M60 200 meters Wind: -0.1 | 1st place, gold medalist(s) | Ralph Peterson | United States | 25.43 |
| M60 200 meters Wind: -0.1 | 2nd place, silver medalist(s) | Charles Allie | United States | 25.83 |
| M60 200 meters Wind: -0.1 | 3rd place, bronze medalist(s) | Vincenzo Felicetti | Italy | 25.99 |
M65 200 meters Wind: -1.1
| M65 200 meters Wind: -1.1 | 1st place, gold medalist(s) | Stephen Robbins | United States | 26.12 |
| M65 200 meters Wind: -1.1 | 2nd place, silver medalist(s) | Peter Crombie | Australia | 26.46 |
| M65 200 meters Wind: -1.1 | 3rd place, bronze medalist(s) | Stanley Whitley | United States | 26.89 |
M70 200 meters Wind: -0.1
| M70 200 meters Wind: -0.1 | 1st place, gold medalist(s) | Robert Lida | United States | 27.78 |
| M70 200 meters Wind: -0.1 | 2nd place, silver medalist(s) | Albert Williams | United States | 27.96 |
| M70 200 meters Wind: -0.1 | 3rd place, bronze medalist(s) | Robert Louis Stevenson | Trinidad and Tobago | 28.67 |
M75 200 meters Wind: +0.4
| M75 200 meters Wind: +0.4 | 1st place, gold medalist(s) | Hugh Coogan | Australia | 29.42 |
| M75 200 meters Wind: +0.4 | 2nd place, silver medalist(s) | Robert Cozens | United States | 29.66 |
| M75 200 meters Wind: +0.4 | 3rd place, bronze medalist(s) | Andy Aadmi | Canada | 30.17 |
M80 200 meters Wind: +0.6
| M80 200 meters Wind: +0.6 | 1st place, gold medalist(s) | Hiroo Tanaka | Japan | 30.78 (Revised) |
| M80 200 meters Wind: +0.6 | 2nd place, silver medalist(s) | Yoshiyuki Shimizu | Brazil | 32.41 |
| M80 200 meters Wind: +0.6 | 3rd place, bronze medalist(s) | Earl Fee | Canada | 32.55 |
M85 200 meters Wind: +0.3
| M85 200 meters Wind: +0.3 | 1st place, gold medalist(s) | Hugo Ant Delgado Flores | Peru | 37.85 (Revised) |
| M85 200 meters Wind: +0.3 | 2nd place, silver medalist(s) | Santiago Sanchez Mata | Mexico | 42.55 |
| M85 200 meters Wind: +0.3 | 3rd place, bronze medalist(s) | William Ballantine | United States | 46.16 |
M90 200 meters Wind: +0.0
| M90 200 meters Wind: +0.0 | 1st place, gold medalist(s) | Jim Manno | United States | 42.65 |
| M90 200 meters Wind: +0.0 | 2nd place, silver medalist(s) | Frederico Fischer | Brazil | 44.00 |
| M90 200 meters Wind: +0.0 | 3rd place, bronze medalist(s) | Antonio Tejada Vergara | Mexico | 50.58 |
M95 200 meters Wind: +0.6
| M95 200 meters Wind: +0.6 | 1st place, gold medalist(s) | António Fonseca | Brazil | 1:00.79 (Revised) |

=== 400 meters ===
| Event | Pos | Athlete | Country | Result |
|---|---|---|---|---|
W35 400 meters
| W35 400 meters | 1st place, gold medalist(s) | Emanuela Baggiolini | Italy | 56.48 |
| W35 400 meters | 2nd place, silver medalist(s) | LaTrica Dendy | United States | 57.19 |
| W35 400 meters | 3rd place, bronze medalist(s) | Maurelhena Walles | United States | 58.80 |
W40 400 meters
| W40 400 meters | 1st place, gold medalist(s) | Lisa Daley | United States | 57.42 |
| W40 400 meters | 2nd place, silver medalist(s) | Charmaine Roberts | United States | 57.76 |
| W40 400 meters | 3rd place, bronze medalist(s) | Denise Morley | Great Britain | 59.64 |
W45 400 meters
| W45 400 meters | 1st place, gold medalist(s) | Jai Black | United States | 58.71 |
| W45 400 meters | 2nd place, silver medalist(s) | Julie Brims | Australia | 58.83 |
| W45 400 meters | 3rd place, bronze medalist(s) | Virginia Mitchell | Great Britain | 1:00.47 |
W50 400 meters
| W50 400 meters | 1st place, gold medalist(s) | Julie Forster | Australia | 1:01.09 |
| W50 400 meters | 2nd place, silver medalist(s) | Elaine Pretorius | South Africa | 1:01.14 |
| W50 400 meters | 3rd place, bronze medalist(s) | Petra Kauerhof | Germany | 1:01.33 |
W55 400 meters
| W55 400 meters | 1st place, gold medalist(s) | Caroline Powell | Great Britain | 1:04.21 |
| W55 400 meters | 2nd place, silver medalist(s) | Joylyn Saunders-Mullins | Great Britain | 1:08.23 |
| W55 400 meters | 3rd place, bronze medalist(s) | Paula Dickson-Taylor | United States | 1:09.13 |
W60 400 meters
| W60 400 meters | 1st place, gold medalist(s) | Kathryn Heagney | Australia | 1:09.22 |
| W60 400 meters | 2nd place, silver medalist(s) | Sharlet Gilbert Lackey | United States | 1:11.42 |
| W60 400 meters | 3rd place, bronze medalist(s) | Coreen Steinbach | United States | 1:12.79 |
W65 400 meters
| W65 400 meters | 1st place, gold medalist(s) | Marge Allison | Australia | 1:11.33 |
| W65 400 meters | 2nd place, silver medalist(s) | Aletta Ungerer | South Africa | 1:12.80 |
| W65 400 meters | 3rd place, bronze medalist(s) | Oddbjoerg Haakensveen | Norway | 1:13.80 |
W70 400 meters
| W70 400 meters | 1st place, gold medalist(s) | Anne Stobaus | Australia | 1:16.63 WR |
| W70 400 meters | 2nd place, silver medalist(s) | Jean Daprano | United States | 1:19.44 |
| W70 400 meters | 3rd place, bronze medalist(s) | Christa Bortignon | Canada | 1:25.16 |
W75 400 meters
| W75 400 meters | 1st place, gold medalist(s) | Maria Emma Mazzenga | Italy | 1:26.74 |
| W75 400 meters | 2nd place, silver medalist(s) | Janina Rosinska | Poland | 1:36.88 |
| W75 400 meters | 3rd place, bronze medalist(s) | Fei-Mei Chou | United States | 1:50.67 |
W80 400 meters
| W80 400 meters | 1st place, gold medalist(s) | Ernestina Ramirez | Mexico | 1:49.77 |
| W80 400 meters | 2nd place, silver medalist(s) | Marcia Petley | New Zealand | 2:03.78 |
| W80 400 meters | 3rd place, bronze medalist(s) | Abondano Mar De Londono | Colombia | 2:17.08 |
W85 400 meters
| W85 400 meters | 1st place, gold medalist(s) | Patricia Peterson | United States | 2:07.79 WR |
| W85 400 meters | 2nd place, silver medalist(s) | Fontan Emilia De Garcia | Colombia | 2:09.22 |
| W85 400 meters | 3rd place, bronze medalist(s) | Tomico Saito | Brazil | 2:25.37 |
M35 400 meters
| M35 400 meters | 1st place, gold medalist(s) | Antwon Dussett | United States | 47.34 |
| M35 400 meters | 2nd place, silver medalist(s) | Brian O. Jorgensen | Denmark | 49.12 |
| M35 400 meters | 3rd place, bronze medalist(s) | Javie Hernandez Morales | Puerto Rico | 49.66 |
M40 400 meters
| M40 400 meters | 1st place, gold medalist(s) | Eric Prince | United States | 49.61 |
| M40 400 meters | 2nd place, silver medalist(s) | Darren Scott | Great Britain | 49.81 |
| M40 400 meters | 3rd place, bronze medalist(s) | Andreas Schulze | Germany | 50.49 |
M45 400 meters
| M45 400 meters | 1st place, gold medalist(s) | Khalid Mulazim | United States | 50.7 |
| M45 400 meters | 2nd place, silver medalist(s) | Michael Sherar | Canada | 51.59 |
| M45 400 meters | 3rd place, bronze medalist(s) | Duane Gosa | United States | 51.91 |
M50 400 meters
| M50 400 meters | 1st place, gold medalist(s) | Michael Sullivan | United States | 51.93 |
| M50 400 meters | 2nd place, silver medalist(s) | Corey Moody | United States | 53.04 |
| M50 400 meters | 3rd place, bronze medalist(s) | Ray Blackwell M53 | United States | 53.70 |
M55 400 meters
| M55 400 meters | 1st place, gold medalist(s) | Mark Davis | United States | 55.85 |
| M55 400 meters | 2nd place, silver medalist(s) | Reinhard Michelchen | Germany | 55.89 |
| M55 400 meters | 3rd place, bronze medalist(s) | Walwyn Franklyn | Great Britain | 57.11 |
M60 400 meters
| M60 400 meters | 1st place, gold medalist(s) | Charles Allie | United States | 55.91 |
| M60 400 meters | 2nd place, silver medalist(s) | Vincenzo Felicetti | Italy | 57.22 |
| M60 400 meters | 3rd place, bronze medalist(s) | Carroll Blake | United States | 58.51 |
M65 400 meters
| M65 400 meters | 1st place, gold medalist(s) | Peter Crombie | Australia | 59.38 |
| M65 400 meters | 2nd place, silver medalist(s) | Roger Pierce | United States | 1:00.06 |
| M65 400 meters | 3rd place, bronze medalist(s) | Larry Barnum | United States | 1:00.41 |
M70 400 meters
| M70 400 meters | 1st place, gold medalist(s) | Robert Lida | United States | 1:03.58 |
| M70 400 meters | 2nd place, silver medalist(s) | Clifford Cordy | Colombia | 1:04.36 |
| M70 400 meters | 3rd place, bronze medalist(s) | Maurice McDonald | United States | 1:05.46 |
M75 400 meters
| M75 400 meters | 1st place, gold medalist(s) | Hugh Coogan | Australia | 1:06.41 |
| M75 400 meters | 2nd place, silver medalist(s) | Robert Cozens | United States | 1:09.67 |
| M75 400 meters | 3rd place, bronze medalist(s) | Andy Aadmi | Canada | 1:10.54 |
M80 400 meters
| M80 400 meters | 1st place, gold medalist(s) | Hiroo Tanaka | Japan | 1:11.53 |
| M80 400 meters | 2nd place, silver medalist(s) | Earl Fee | Canada | 1:12.73 |
| M80 400 meters | 3rd place, bronze medalist(s) | Irwin Barrett-Lennard | Australia | 1:25.27 |
M85 400 meters
| M85 400 meters | 1st place, gold medalist(s) | Mamoru Ussami | Brazil | 1:53.78 |
| M85 400 meters | 2nd place, silver medalist(s) | William Ballantine | United States | 1:54.94 |
| M85 400 meters | 3rd place, bronze medalist(s) | Lal Chaman Saihgal | India | 5:54.54 |
M90 400 meters
| M90 400 meters | 1st place, gold medalist(s) | Emile Pauwels | Belgium | 2:10.40 |
| M90 400 meters | 2nd place, silver medalist(s) | Antonio Vergara Tejada | Mexico | 2:10.57 |
| M90 400 meters | 3rd place, bronze medalist(s) | Daniel Bulkley | United States | 2:11.86 |

=== 800 meters ===
| Event | Pos | Athlete | Country | Result |
|---|---|---|---|---|
W35 800 meters
| W35 800 meters | 1st place, gold medalist(s) | Emanuela Baggiolini | Italy | 2:11.7 0 |
| W35 800 meters | 2nd place, silver medalist(s) | Ingrid Grutters | Netherlands | 2:12.63 |
| W35 800 meters | 3rd place, bronze medalist(s) | Hanna Haavikko | Finland | 2:16.98 |
W40 800 meters
| W40 800 meters | 1st place, gold medalist(s) | Sonja Friend-Uhl | United States | 2:10.02 |
| W40 800 meters | 2nd place, silver medalist(s) | Denise Morley | Great Britain | 2:15.29 |
| W40 800 meters | 3rd place, bronze medalist(s) | Aeron Genet Arlin | United States | 2:17.54 |
W45 800 meters
| W45 800 meters | 1st place, gold medalist(s) | Lisa Valle | United States | 2:20.73 |
| W45 800 meters | 2nd place, silver medalist(s) | Corinne Debaets | Belgium | 2:21.29 |
| W45 800 meters | 3rd place, bronze medalist(s) | Annie Bunting | Canada | 2:23.54 |
W50 800 meters
| W50 800 meters | 1st place, gold medalist(s) | Elaine Pretorius | South Africa | 2:23.73 |
| W50 800 meters | 2nd place, silver medalist(s) | Laura Mahady | Great Britain | 2:24.72 |
| W50 800 meters | 3rd place, bronze medalist(s) | Mónica Regonesi | Chile | 2:28.14 |
W55 800 meters
| W55 800 meters | 1st place, gold medalist(s) | Rita Quibell | Canada | 2:37.00 |
| W55 800 meters | 2nd place, silver medalist(s) | Ma. Penafiel Fernandez | Mexico | 2:38.07 |
| W55 800 meters | 3rd place, bronze medalist(s) | Kathryn Martin | United States | 2:39.32 |
W60 800 meters
| W60 800 meters | 1st place, gold medalist(s) | Ingerlise V. Jensen | Denmark | 2:38.93 |
| W60 800 meters | 2nd place, silver medalist(s) | Angela Copson | Great Britain | 2:40.54 |
| W60 800 meters | 3rd place, bronze medalist(s) | Kathryn Heagney | Australia | 2:41.54 |
W70 800 meters
| W70 800 meters | 1st place, gold medalist(s) | Jean Daprano | United States | 3:03.13 (Revised) |
| W70 800 meters | 2nd place, silver medalist(s) | Anne Stobaus | Australia | 3:03.94 |
| W70 800 meters | 3rd place, bronze medalist(s) | Lorraine Lopes | Australia | 3:10.54 |
W75 800 meters
| W75 800 meters | 1st place, gold medalist(s) | Helly Visser | Canada | 3:46.59 |
| W75 800 meters | 2nd place, silver medalist(s) | Anne Martin | Great Britain | 3:48.14 |
| W75 800 meters | 3rd place, bronze medalist(s) | Mary Harada | United States | 4:05.76 |
W80 800 meters
| W80 800 meters | 1st place, gold medalist(s) | Lenore Montgomery | Canada | 4:00.53 |
| W80 800 meters | 2nd place, silver medalist(s) | Thelma Wilson | United States | 4:20.62 |
| W80 800 meters | 3rd place, bronze medalist(s) | Marcia Petley | New Zealand | 5:17.32 |
W85 800 meters
| W85 800 meters | 1st place, gold medalist(s) | Tomico Saito | Brazil | 5:23.52 |
| W85 800 meters | 2nd place, silver medalist(s) | Maria Alves | Brazil | 6:58.03 |
M35 800 meters
| M35 800 meters | 1st place, gold medalist(s) | Michael Schroer | United States | 1:57.14 |
| M35 800 meters | 2nd place, silver medalist(s) | Martin Aust | Czech Republic | 1:57.74 |
| M35 800 meters | 3rd place, bronze medalist(s) | Gabor Boross | Hungary | 1:57.97 |
M40 800 meters
| M40 800 meters | 1st place, gold medalist(s) | Neil Fitzgerald | United States | 1:55.70 |
| M40 800 meters | 2nd place, silver medalist(s) | Rich Tremain | Canada | 1:55.76 |
| M40 800 meters | 3rd place, bronze medalist(s) | Brian Sax | United States | 1:55.83 |
M45 800 meters
| M45 800 meters | 1st place, gold medalist(s) | Michael Sherar | Canada | 1:58.11 |
| M45 800 meters | 2nd place, silver medalist(s) | Joe Carnegie | United States | 1:59.89 |
| M45 800 meters | 3rd place, bronze medalist(s) | Robert Schwerkolt | Australia | 2:00.08 |
M50 800 meters
| M50 800 meters | 1st place, gold medalist(s) | Anselm LeBourne | United States | 2:01.30 |
| M50 800 meters | 2nd place, silver medalist(s) | Ray Knerr | United States | 2:02.32 |
| M50 800 meters | 3rd place, bronze medalist(s) | George Shackelford | United States | 2:03.42 |
M55 800 meters
| M55 800 meters | 1st place, gold medalist(s) | Peter Hawes | Australia | 2:07.87 |
| M55 800 meters | 2nd place, silver medalist(s) | Alastair Dunlop | Great Britain | 2:09.12 |
| M55 800 meters | 3rd place, bronze medalist(s) | Horace Grant | United States | 2:09.67 |
M60 800 meters
| M60 800 meters | 1st place, gold medalist(s) | Carlos Loaiza | Colombia | 2:11.65 |
| M60 800 meters | 2nd place, silver medalist(s) | Nolan Shaheed | United States | 2:11.98 |
| M60 800 meters | 3rd place, bronze medalist(s) | Dennis Lang | Canada | 2:13.22 |
M65 800 meters
| M65 800 meters | 1st place, gold medalist(s) | Gary Patton | United States | 2:21.25 |
| M65 800 meters | 2nd place, silver medalist(s) | Charles Lawson | United States | 2:23.64 |
| M65 800 meters | 3rd place, bronze medalist(s) | Donald Mathewson | Australia | 2:25.091 |
M70 800 meters
| M70 800 meters | 1st place, gold medalist(s) | Maurice McDonald | United States | 2:34.37 |
| M70 800 meters | 2nd place, silver medalist(s) | Sid Howard | United States | 2:36.44 |
| M70 800 meters | 3rd place, bronze medalist(s) | Axel Wendt | Germany | 2:36.73 |
M75 800 meters
| M75 800 meters | 1st place, gold medalist(s) | David Carr | Australia | 2:46.02 |
| M75 800 meters | 2nd place, silver medalist(s) | Manuel Domingo Alonso | Spain | 2:46.82 |
| M75 800 meters | 3rd place, bronze medalist(s) | Bill Spencer | United States | 2:56.07 |
M80 800 meters
| M80 800 meters | 1st place, gold medalist(s) | Earl Fee | Canada | 2:53.71 |
| M80 800 meters | 2nd place, silver medalist(s) | Michio Kumamoto | Japan | 3:03.67 |
| M80 800 meters | 3rd place, bronze medalist(s) | Hisashi Nakagawa | Japan | 3:16.06 |
M85 800 meters
| M85 800 meters | 1st place, gold medalist(s) | Roy Englert | United States | 4:27.12 |
| M85 800 meters | 2nd place, silver medalist(s) | Lal Chaman Saihgal | India | 11:43.13 |
M90 800 meters
| M90 800 meters | 1st place, gold medalist(s) | Antonio Vergara Tejada | Mexico | 4:40.00 |
| M90 800 meters | 2nd place, silver medalist(s) | Emile Pauwels | Belgium | 5:08.06 |

=== 1500 meters ===
| Event | Pos | Athlete | Country | Result |
|---|---|---|---|---|
W35 1500 meters
| W35 1500 meters | 1st place, gold medalist(s) | Ingrid Grutters | Netherlands | 4:50.13 |
| W35 1500 meters | 2nd place, silver medalist(s) | Hanna Haavikko | Finland | 4:53.18 |
| W35 1500 meters | 3rd place, bronze medalist(s) | Jeanine James | France | 4:56.06 |
W40 1500 meters
| W40 1500 meters | 1st place, gold medalist(s) | Sonja Friend-Uhl | United States | 4:28.52 |
| W40 1500 meters | 2nd place, silver medalist(s) | Grace Padilla | United States | 4:33.80 |
| W40 1500 meters | 3rd place, bronze medalist(s) | Lisa Ryan | United States | 4:38.63 |
W45 1500 meters
| W45 1500 meters | 1st place, gold medalist(s) | Corinne Debaets | Belgium | 4:42.87 |
| W45 1500 meters | 2nd place, silver medalist(s) | Lisa Valle | United States | 4:44.00 |
| W45 1500 meters | 3rd place, bronze medalist(s) | Annie Bunting | Canada | 4:54.26 |
W50 1500 meters
| W50 1500 meters | 1st place, gold medalist(s) | Mónica Regonesi | Chile | 4:51.63 |
| W50 1500 meters | 2nd place, silver medalist(s) | Carmen Ayala-Troncoso | United States | 4:59.97 |
| W50 1500 meters | 3rd place, bronze medalist(s) | Patty Blanchard | Canada | 5:01.72 |
W55 1500 meters
| W55 1500 meters | 1st place, gold medalist(s) | Rita Quibell | Canada | 5:22.48 |
| W55 1500 meters | 2nd place, silver medalist(s) | Ma. Penafiel Fernandez | Mexico | 5:24.71 |
| W55 1500 meters | 3rd place, bronze medalist(s) | Marianne Fullove | United States | 5:33.46 |
W60 1500 meters
| W60 1500 meters | 1st place, gold medalist(s) | Ingerlise V. Jensen | Denmark | 5:48.92 |
| W60 1500 meters | 2nd place, silver medalist(s) | Coreen Steinbach | United States | 5:50.03 |
| W60 1500 meters | 3rd place, bronze medalist(s) | Sabra Harvey | United States | 5:51.37 |
W70 1500 meters
| W70 1500 meters | 1st place, gold medalist(s) | Jean Daprano | United States | 6:30.07 |
| W70 1500 meters | 2nd place, silver medalist(s) | Lorraine Lopes | Australia | 6:31.96 |
| W70 1500 meters | 3rd place, bronze medalist(s) | Margie Stoll | United States | 6:48.96 |
W75 1500 meters
| W75 1500 meters | 1st place, gold medalist(s) | Helly Visser | Canada | 7:40.85 |
| W75 1500 meters | 2nd place, silver medalist(s) | Anne Martin | Great Britain | 7:46.20 |
| W75 1500 meters | 3rd place, bronze medalist(s) | Dawn Cumming | New Zealand | 8:00.18 |
W80 1500 meters
| W80 1500 meters | 1st place, gold medalist(s) | Thelma Wilson | United States | 8:32.02 |
W85 1500 meters
| W85 1500 meters | 1st place, gold medalist(s) | Maria Alves | Brazil | 13:49.13 |
M35 1500 meters
| M35 1500 meters | 1st place, gold medalist(s) | Randy Wasinger | United States | 3:58.71 |
| M35 1500 meters | 2nd place, silver medalist(s) | Fernando Marcos Lorenzo | Spain | 3:59.49 |
| M35 1500 meters | 3rd place, bronze medalist(s) | Gabor Boross | Hungary | 4:01.14 |
M40 1500 meters
| M40 1500 meters | 1st place, gold medalist(s) | Rich Tremain | Canada | 4:03.37 |
| M40 1500 meters | 2nd place, silver medalist(s) | Charlie Kern | United States | 4:04.33 |
| M40 1500 meters | 3rd place, bronze medalist(s) | Andres Daniel Castro | Argentina | 4:05.18 |
M45 1500 meters
| M45 1500 meters | 1st place, gold medalist(s) | Robert Schwerkolt | Australia | 4:06.91 |
| M45 1500 meters | 2nd place, silver medalist(s) | Michael Blackmore | United States | 4:08.25 |
| M45 1500 meters | 3rd place, bronze medalist(s) | Sean Messiter | United States | 4:08.82 |
M50 1500 meters
| M50 1500 meters | 1st place, gold medalist(s) | Anselm LeBourne | United States | 4:15.87 |
| M50 1500 meters | 2nd place, silver medalist(s) | Ray Knerr | United States | 4:16.97 |
| M50 1500 meters | 3rd place, bronze medalist(s) | Chris Deighan | Canada | 4:19.71 |
M55 1500 meters
| M55 1500 meters | 1st place, gold medalist(s) | Keith Bateman | Australia | 4:12.35 WR |
| M55 1500 meters | 2nd place, silver medalist(s) | Martinus Van der Hoorn | Netherlands | 4:24.57 |
| M55 1500 meters | 3rd place, bronze medalist(s) | Alastair Dunlop | Great Britain | 4:25.81 |
M60 1500 meters
| M60 1500 meters | 1st place, gold medalist(s) | Nolan Shaheed | United States | 4:35.97 |
| M60 1500 meters | 2nd place, silver medalist(s) | Dennis Lang | Canada | 4:37.79 |
| M60 1500 meters | 3rd place, bronze medalist(s) | David Oxland | Great Britain | 4:37.88 |
M65 1500 meters
| M65 1500 meters | 1st place, gold medalist(s) | Gary Patton | United States | 4:46.05 |
| M65 1500 meters | 2nd place, silver medalist(s) | Emilio de la Camara | Spain | 4:48.80 |
| M65 1500 meters | 3rd place, bronze medalist(s) | Donald Mathewson | Australia | 4:50.80 |
M70 1500 meters
| M70 1500 meters | 1st place, gold medalist(s) | Ron Robertson | New Zealand | 4:52.95 WR |
| M70 1500 meters | 2nd place, silver medalist(s) | Jean-louis Esnault | France | 5:15.68 |
| M70 1500 meters | 3rd place, bronze medalist(s) | Peter Sandery | Australia | 5:17.21 |
M75 1500 meters
| M75 1500 meters | 1st place, gold medalist(s) | Bernardino Pereira | Portugal | 5:35.28 |
| M75 1500 meters | 2nd place, silver medalist(s) | Manuel Alonso Domingo | Spain | 5:35.52 |
| M75 1500 meters | 3rd place, bronze medalist(s) | David Carr | Australia | 5:38.86 |
M80 1500 meters
| M80 1500 meters | 1st place, gold medalist(s) | Ed Whitlock | Canada | 5:48.93 WR |
| M80 1500 meters | 2nd place, silver medalist(s) | Michio Kumamoto | Japan | 6:12.14 |
| M80 1500 meters | 3rd place, bronze medalist(s) | Gunnar Linde | United States | 6:44.71 |
M85 1500 meters
| M85 1500 meters | 1st place, gold medalist(s) | Jose Canelo | Portugal | 8:25.25 |
M90 1500 meters
| M90 1500 meters | 1st place, gold medalist(s) | Antonio Tejada Vergara | Mexico | 10:16.29 |
| M90 1500 meters | 2nd place, silver medalist(s) | Emile Pauwels | Belgium | 10:53.46 |

=== 5000 meters ===
| Event | Pos | Athlete | Country | Result |
|---|---|---|---|---|
W35 5000 meters
| W35 5000 meters | 1st place, gold medalist(s) | Domenica Maria Manchia | Italy | 18:37.53 |
| W35 5000 meters | 2nd place, silver medalist(s) | Hanna Haavikko | Finland | 18:40.62 |
| W35 5000 meters | 3rd place, bronze medalist(s) | Jeanine James | France | 18:42.28 |
W35 5000 meters
| W35 5000 meters | 1st place, gold medalist(s) | Mary Coordt | United States | 18:02.33 |
| W35 5000 meters | 2nd place, silver medalist(s) | Rebecca Sondag | United States | 18:06.09 |
| W35 5000 meters | 3rd place, bronze medalist(s) | Magdalena Visser | United States | 18:08.22 |
W35 5000 meters
| W35 5000 meters | 1st place, gold medalist(s) | Sally Gibbs | New Zealand | 17:19.43 |
| W35 5000 meters | 2nd place, silver medalist(s) | Tania Fischer | United States | 17:33.73 |
| W35 5000 meters | 3rd place, bronze medalist(s) | Sylvia Mosqueda | United States | 17:51.96 |
W35 5000 meters
| W35 5000 meters | 1st place, gold medalist(s) | Carmen Ayala-Troncoso | United States | 18:44.73 |
| W35 5000 meters | 2nd place, silver medalist(s) | Wendy Pratt | United States | 19:16.21 |
| W35 5000 meters | 3rd place, bronze medalist(s) | Patty Blanchard | Canada | 19:19.84 |
W35 5000 meters
| W35 5000 meters | 1st place, gold medalist(s) | Christine Kennedy | United States | 19:36.56 |
| W35 5000 meters | 2nd place, silver medalist(s) | Kathryn Martin | United States | 19:58.74 |
| W35 5000 meters | 3rd place, bronze medalist(s) | Rosemary Roediger | Australia | 20:14.68 |
W35 5000 meters
| W35 5000 meters | 1st place, gold medalist(s) | Angela Copson | Great Britain | 21:20.71 |
| W35 5000 meters | 2nd place, silver medalist(s) | Edie Stevenson | United States | 21:22.36 |
| W35 5000 meters | 3rd place, bronze medalist(s) | Rosalind Tabor | Great Britain | 21:25.79 |
W35 5000 meters
| W35 5000 meters | 1st place, gold medalist(s) | Patricia Gallagher | Great Britain | 22:37.63 |
| W35 5000 meters | 2nd place, silver medalist(s) | Sieglinde Schmieder | Austria | 22:46.52 |
| W35 5000 meters | 3rd place, bronze medalist(s) | Michele Torti | France | 22:53.65 |
W35 5000 meters
| W35 5000 meters | 1st place, gold medalist(s) | Joaquina Flores | Portugal | 23:21.57 |
| W35 5000 meters | 2nd place, silver medalist(s) | Lorraine Lopes | Australia | 23:45.57 |
| W35 5000 meters | 3rd place, bronze medalist(s) | Xuhua Chen | China | 23:56.22 |
W35 5000 meters
| W35 5000 meters | 1st place, gold medalist(s) | Anne Martin | Great Britain | 28:36.35 |
| W35 5000 meters | 2nd place, silver medalist(s) | Margarida Hochstatter | Brazil | 29:06.25 |
| W35 5000 meters | 3rd place, bronze medalist(s) | Mary Harada | United States | 30:27.51 |
W35 5000 meters
| W35 5000 meters | 1st place, gold medalist(s) | Lenore Montgomery | Canada | 29:30.65 |
| W35 5000 meters | 2nd place, silver medalist(s) | Ruth Angelis | Germany | 41:48.08 |
W35 5000 meters
| W35 5000 meters | 1st place, gold medalist(s) | Tomico Saito | Brazil | 49:48.91 |
| W35 5000 meters | 2nd place, silver medalist(s) | Maria Alves | Brazil | 51:19.95 |
W35 5000 meters
| W35 5000 meters | 1st place, gold medalist(s) | Fabrice Thiery | France | 15:15.20 |
| W35 5000 meters | 2nd place, silver medalist(s) | Robert Celinski | Poland | 15:16.17 |
| W35 5000 meters | 3rd place, bronze medalist(s) | Javier Sanz Sanfructuoso | Spain | 16:12.04 |
W35 5000 meters
| W35 5000 meters | 1st place, gold medalist(s) | Daniel Andres Castro | Argentina | 15:22.30 |
| W35 5000 meters | 2nd place, silver medalist(s) | Cesar Troncoso Troncoso | Argentina | 15:22.64 |
| W35 5000 meters | 3rd place, bronze medalist(s) | Elarbi Khattabi | Morocco | 15:29.26 |
W35 5000 meters
| W35 5000 meters | 1st place, gold medalist(s) | Francisco Javier Fontaneda | Spain | 15:23.28 |
| W35 5000 meters | 2nd place, silver medalist(s) | Sergey Perminov | Russia | 15:27.30 |
| W35 5000 meters | 3rd place, bronze medalist(s) | Ben Reynolds | Great Britain | 15:27.94 |
W35 5000 meters
| W35 5000 meters | 1st place, gold medalist(s) | Sergey Polikarpov | Kazakhstan | 15:39.61 |
| W35 5000 meters | 2nd place, silver medalist(s) | Grzegorz Kielczewski | Poland | 16:17.91 |
| W35 5000 meters | 3rd place, bronze medalist(s) | Iain Mickle | United States | 16:21.99 |
W35 5000 meters
| W35 5000 meters | 1st place, gold medalist(s) | Keith Bateman | Australia | 16:35.05 |
| W35 5000 meters | 2nd place, silver medalist(s) | Elmer McPhail | United States | 17:00.60 |
| W35 5000 meters | 3rd place, bronze medalist(s) | Jose del Carmen Ramirez | Colombia | 17:04.47 |
W35 5000 meters
| W35 5000 meters | 1st place, gold medalist(s) | David Oxland | Great Britain | 17:19.30 |
| W35 5000 meters | 2nd place, silver medalist(s) | Nolan Shaheed | United States | 17:19.60 |
| W35 5000 meters | 3rd place, bronze medalist(s) | John Herridge | Australia | 18:00.97 |
W35 5000 meters
| W35 5000 meters | 1st place, gold medalist(s) | Emilio de la Camara | Spain | 18:07.91 |
| W35 5000 meters | 2nd place, silver medalist(s) | Albert Andereqq | Switzerland | 18:16.10 |
| W35 5000 meters | 3rd place, bronze medalist(s) | Malcolm Renyard | Great Britain | 18:25.42 |
W35 5000 meters
| W35 5000 meters | 1st place, gold medalist(s) | Ron Robertson | New Zealand | 18:15.53 WR |
| W35 5000 meters | 2nd place, silver medalist(s) | Peter Sandery | Australia | 19:20.47 |
| W35 5000 meters | 3rd place, bronze medalist(s) | John Batchelor | Great Britain | 19:49.82 |
W35 5000 meters
| W35 5000 meters | 1st place, gold medalist(s) | Bernardino Pereira | Portugal | 20:47.79 |
| W35 5000 meters | 2nd place, silver medalist(s) | Manuel Rosales | Spain | 21:18.52 |
| W35 5000 meters | 3rd place, bronze medalist(s) | William Iffrig | United States | 21:20.22 |
W35 5000 meters
| W35 5000 meters | 1st place, gold medalist(s) | Ed Whitlock | Canada | 21:32.87 |
| W35 5000 meters | 2nd place, silver medalist(s) | Hisashi Nakagawa | Japan | 25:38.11 |
| W35 5000 meters | 3rd place, bronze medalist(s) | Paul Flanagan | United States | 25:54.20 |
W35 5000 meters
| W35 5000 meters | 1st place, gold medalist(s) | Jose Canelo | Portugal | 30:53.58 |
| W35 5000 meters | 2nd place, silver medalist(s) | Roy Englert | United States | 34:05.40 |
| W35 5000 meters | 3rd place, bronze medalist(s) | Tomas Velasco | Mexico | 34:40.55 |
W35 5000 meters
| W35 5000 meters | 1st place, gold medalist(s) | Ricardo Juan Ciapparelli | Argentina | 56:13.58 |

=== 10,000 meters ===
| Event | Pos | Athlete | Country | Result |
|---|---|---|---|---|
W35 10K
| W35 10K | 1st place, gold medalist(s) | Maria Domenica Manchia | Italy | 39:26.49 |
| W35 10K | 2nd place, silver medalist(s) | Hanna Haavikko | Finland | 40:38.14 |
| W35 10K | 3rd place, bronze medalist(s) | Cecilia Pascual-Garrido | Argentina | 43:24.96 |
W40 10K
| W40 10K | 1st place, gold medalist(s) | Mary Coordt | United States | 37:08.13 |
| W40 10K | 2nd place, silver medalist(s) | Rebecca Sondag | United States | 37:10.97 |
| W40 10K | 3rd place, bronze medalist(s) | Verity Breen | Australia | 38:26.67 |
W45 10K
| W45 10K | 1st place, gold medalist(s) | Sally Gibbs | New Zealand | 36:03.59 |
| W45 10K | 2nd place, silver medalist(s) | Soledad Castro Soliño | Spain | 37:41.78 |
| W45 10K | 3rd place, bronze medalist(s) | Susan Ridley | Great Britain | 40:08.90 |
W50 10K
| W50 10K | 1st place, gold medalist(s) | Monica Regonesi | Chile | 38:29.00 |
| W50 10K | 2nd place, silver medalist(s) | Laura Bruess | United States | 40:08.76 |
| W50 10K | 3rd place, bronze medalist(s) | Elena Shemyakina | United States | 40:22.25 |
W55 10K
| W55 10K | 1st place, gold medalist(s) | Kathryn Martin | United States | 39:56.53 |
| W55 10K | 2nd place, silver medalist(s) | Rosemary Roediger | Australia | 40:51.59 |
| W55 10K | 3rd place, bronze medalist(s) | Miriam Zderic | United States | 41:06.20 |
W60 10K
| W60 10K | 1st place, gold medalist(s) | Angela Copson | Great Britain | 41:22.70 |
| W60 10K | 2nd place, silver medalist(s) | Rosalind Tabor | Great Britain | 44:09.14 |
| W60 10K | 3rd place, bronze medalist(s) | Judith Stewart | New Zealand | 44:16.17 |
W65 10K
| W65 10K | 1st place, gold medalist(s) | Lavinia Petrie | Australia | 44:14.72 |
| W65 10K | 2nd place, silver medalist(s) | Sieglinde Schmieder | Austria | 45:52.35 |
| W65 10K | 3rd place, bronze medalist(s) | Michele Torti | France | 47:48.29 |
W70 10K
| W70 10K | 1st place, gold medalist(s) | Joaquina Flores | Portugal | 48:08.96 |
| W70 10K | 2nd place, silver medalist(s) | Xuhua Chen | China | 50:14.04 |
| W70 10K | 3rd place, bronze medalist(s) | Zofia Turosz | Poland | 54:18.54 |
W75 10K
| W75 10K | 1st place, gold medalist(s) | Denise Leclerc | France | 51:18.57 |
| W75 10K | 2nd place, silver medalist(s) | Mariela Restrepo | Colombia | 5:29.45 |
| W75 10K | 3rd place, bronze medalist(s) | Ruth Helfenstein | Switzerland | 6:14.64 |
W80 10K
| W80 10K | 1st place, gold medalist(s) | Ruth Angelis | Germany | 22:24.25 |
W85 10K
| W85 10K | 1st place, gold medalist(s) | Tomico Saito | Brazil | 29:55.16 |
M35 10K
| M35 10K | 1st place, gold medalist(s) | Robert Celinski | Poland | 31:58.96 |
| M35 10K | 2nd place, silver medalist(s) | Oscar Vega | Costa Rica | 33:39.87 |
| M35 10K | 3rd place, bronze medalist(s) | Jiri Brychta | Czech Republic | 33:56.56 |
M40 10K
| M40 10K | 1st place, gold medalist(s) | Cesar Troncoso Troncoso | Argentina | 32:34.27 |
| M40 10K | 2nd place, silver medalist(s) | Elarbi Khattabi | Morocco | 32:39.95 |
| M40 10K | 3rd place, bronze medalist(s) | John Reich | United States | 33:43.47 |
M45 10K
| M45 10K | 1st place, gold medalist(s) | Francisco Javier Fontaneda | Spain | 31:32.85 |
| M45 10K | 2nd place, silver medalist(s) | Benjamín Paredes | Mexico | 31:40.88 |
| M45 10K | 3rd place, bronze medalist(s) | Sergey Perminov | Russia | 31:50.74 |
M50 10K
| M50 10K | 1st place, gold medalist(s) | Sergey Polikarpov | Kazakhstan | 32:30.31 |
| M50 10K | 2nd place, silver medalist(s) | Grzegorz Kielczewski | Poland | 33:43.72 |
| M50 10K | 3rd place, bronze medalist(s) | Brian Pilcher | United States | 34:27.12 |
M55 10K
| M55 10K | 1st place, gold medalist(s) | Jose del Carmen Ramirez | Colombia | 34:54.28 |
| M55 10K | 2nd place, silver medalist(s) | Michael Deegan | Great Britain | 35:18.41 |
| M55 10K | 3rd place, bronze medalist(s) | Rick Becker | United States | 35:30.02 |
M60 10K
| M60 10K | 1st place, gold medalist(s) | Heimo Karkkainen | Finland | 38:05.81 |
| M60 10K | 2nd place, silver medalist(s) | John Herridge | Australia | 38:06.52 |
| M60 10K | 3rd place, bronze medalist(s) | Josef Konrad | Germany | 39:56.58 |
M65 10K
| M65 10K | 1st place, gold medalist(s) | Emilio de al Camara | Spain | 39:55.04 |
| M65 10K | 2nd place, silver medalist(s) | Antonio Carboni | Italy | 40:01.45 |
| M65 10K | 3rd place, bronze medalist(s) | Domingos Moreira | Portugal | 40:14.57 |
M70 10K
| M70 10K | 1st place, gold medalist(s) | Peter Sandery | Australia | 40:36.20 |
| M70 10K | 2nd place, silver medalist(s) | Peter Lessing | Germany | 41:25.60 |
| M70 10K | 3rd place, bronze medalist(s) | Hans Schmid | United States | 42:19.21 |
M75 10K
| M75 10K | 1st place, gold medalist(s) | Bernardino Pereira | Portugal | 43:10.01 |
| M75 10K | 2nd place, silver medalist(s) | Bent Lauridsen | Denmark | 43:43.60 |
| M75 10K | 3rd place, bronze medalist(s) | William Iffrig | United States | 44:14.64 |
M80 10K
| M80 10K | 1st place, gold medalist(s) | Ed Whitlock | Canada | 42:39.95 WR |
| M80 10K | 2nd place, silver medalist(s) | Romulo Rivera Rivera | Mexico | 53:22.16 |
| M80 10K | 3rd place, bronze medalist(s) | Paul Flanagan | United States | 53:33.94 |
M85 10K
| M85 10K | 1st place, gold medalist(s) | Jose Canelo | Portugal | 7:19.12 |
| M85 10K | 2nd place, silver medalist(s) | Roy Englert | United States | 9:48.68 |

=== 80 meters hurdles ===
| Event | Pos | Athlete | Country | Result |
|---|---|---|---|---|
W40 80 meters hurdles Wind: -1.0
| W40 80 meters hurdles Wind: -1.0 | 1st place, gold medalist(s) | Evelin Nagel | Germany | 11.75 |
| W40 80 meters hurdles Wind: -1.0 | 2nd place, silver medalist(s) | Menka Scott | United States | 12.47 |
| W40 80 meters hurdles Wind: -1.0 | 3rd place, bronze medalist(s) | Tatjana Schilling | Germany | 12.48 |
W45 80 meters hurdles Wind: -2.6
| W45 80 meters hurdles Wind: -2.6 | 1st place, gold medalist(s) | Monica Pellegrinelli | Switzerland | 11.76 |
| W45 80 meters hurdles Wind: -2.6 | 2nd place, silver medalist(s) | Geraldine Finegan | Ireland | 12.97 |
| W45 80 meters hurdles Wind: -2.6 | 3rd place, bronze medalist(s) | Valentyna Krepkina | Ukraine | 13.56 |
W50 80 meters hurdles Wind: -1.9
| W50 80 meters hurdles Wind: -1.9 | 1st place, gold medalist(s) | Joy Upshaw | United States | 12.19 |
| W50 80 meters hurdles Wind: -1.9 | 2nd place, silver medalist(s) | Liz Palmer | United States | 12.46 |
| W50 80 meters hurdles Wind: -1.9 | 3rd place, bronze medalist(s) | Sally Stagles | Great Britain | 12.97 |
W55 80 meters hurdles Wind: -1.3
| W55 80 meters hurdles Wind: -1.3 | 1st place, gold medalist(s) | Maria Jesus Sanguos | Spain | 13.82 |
| W55 80 meters hurdles Wind: -1.3 | 2nd place, silver medalist(s) | Carole Filer | Great Britain | 14.07 |
| W55 80 meters hurdles Wind: -1.3 | 3rd place, bronze medalist(s) | Vilma Paris Millan | Puerto Rico | 15.06 |
W60 80 meters hurdles Wind: -1.0
| W60 80 meters hurdles Wind: -1.0 | 1st place, gold medalist(s) | Jean Fail | Great Britain | 14.56 |
| W60 80 meters hurdles Wind: -1.0 | 2nd place, silver medalist(s) | Terhi Kokkonen | Finland | 14.86 |
| W60 80 meters hurdles Wind: -1.0 | 3rd place, bronze medalist(s) | Margaret Taylor | Australia | 14.99 |
W65 80 meters hurdles Wind: -1.5
| W65 80 meters hurdles Wind: -1.5 | 1st place, gold medalist(s) | Marianna Maier | Austria | 15.56 |
| W65 80 meters hurdles Wind: -1.5 | 2nd place, silver medalist(s) | Helgard Houben | Germany | 17.65 |
| W65 80 meters hurdles Wind: -1.5 | 3rd place, bronze medalist(s) | Kerstin Nilsson | Sweden | 19.18 |
W70 80 meters hurdles Wind: -1.4
| W70 80 meters hurdles Wind: -1.4 | 1st place, gold medalist(s) | Erika Sauer | Germany | 18.58 |
| W70 80 meters hurdles Wind: -1.4 | 2nd place, silver medalist(s) | Monica Tang Wing Tang | Trinidad and Tobago | 19.90 |
W75 80 meters hurdles Wind: -1.2
| W75 80 meters hurdles Wind: -1.2 | 1st place, gold medalist(s) | Barbara Jordan | United States | 18.73 |
| W75 80 meters hurdles Wind: -1.2 | 2nd place, silver medalist(s) | Florence Meiler | United States | 18.80 |
| W75 80 meters hurdles Wind: -1.2 | 3rd place, bronze medalist(s) | Hiroko Mabuchi | Japan | 19.22 |
M70 80 meters hurdles Wind: -2.9
| M70 80 meters hurdles Wind: -2.9 | 1st place, gold medalist(s) | Arno Hamaekers | Germany | 14.04 |
| M70 80 meters hurdles Wind: -2.9 | 2nd place, silver medalist(s) | Michael Stevenson | Australia | 14.49 |
| M70 80 meters hurdles Wind: -2.9 | 3rd place, bronze medalist(s) | Valery Ukhov | Russia | 14.62 |
M75 80 meters hurdles Wind: +0.5
| M75 80 meters hurdles Wind: +0.5 | 1st place, gold medalist(s) | Anthony Bowman | Great Britain | 14.99 |
| M75 80 meters hurdles Wind: +0.5 | 2nd place, silver medalist(s) | Yutaka Ueda | Japan | 15.95 |
| M75 80 meters hurdles Wind: +0.5 | 3rd place, bronze medalist(s) | Doug Spainhower | United States | 16.2 |
M80 80 meters hurdles Wind: -0.8
| M80 80 meters hurdles Wind: -0.8 | 1st place, gold medalist(s) | Jerzy Przyborowski | Poland | 19.24 |
M90 80 meters hurdles Wind: -1.5
| M90 80 meters hurdles Wind: -1.5 | 1st place, gold medalist(s) | Ralph Maxwell | United States | 21.62 WR |

=== 100 meters hurdles ===
| Event | Pos | Athlete | Country | Result |
|---|---|---|---|---|
W35 100 meters hurdles 33"; Wind: -0.7
| W35 100 meters hurdles 33"; Wind: -0.7 | 1st place, gold medalist(s) | Cari Soulabail-legendre | France | 15.33 |
| W35 100 meters hurdles 33"; Wind: -0.7 | 2nd place, silver medalist(s) | Rachel Guest | United States | 15.71 |
| W35 100 meters hurdles 33"; Wind: -0.7 | 3rd place, bronze medalist(s) | Melanie Opp | Germany | 19.11 |
M50 100 meters hurdles 36"; Wind: -0.5
| M50 100 meters hurdles 36"; Wind: -0.5 | 1st place, gold medalist(s) | Dexter McCloud | United States | 14.64 |
| M50 100 meters hurdles 36"; Wind: -0.5 | 2nd place, silver medalist(s) | Brian Conley | United States | 14.81 |
| M50 100 meters hurdles 36"; Wind: -0.5 | 3rd place, bronze medalist(s) | Reggie Garner | United States | 14.87 |
M55 100 meters hurdles 36"; Wind: -0.9
| M55 100 meters hurdles 36"; Wind: -0.9 | 1st place, gold medalist(s) | Herbert Kreiner | Austria | 15.11 |
| M55 100 meters hurdles 36"; Wind: -0.9 | 2nd place, silver medalist(s) | Ronald Bolling | United States | 15.83 |
| M55 100 meters hurdles 36"; Wind: -0.9 | 3rd place, bronze medalist(s) | Souza De Ivanildo | Brazil | 16.20 |
M60 100 meters hurdles 33"; Wind: -0.3
| M60 100 meters hurdles 33"; Wind: -0.3 | 1st place, gold medalist(s) | Thaddeus Wilson | United States | 14.78 |
| M60 100 meters hurdles 33"; Wind: -0.3 | 2nd place, silver medalist(s) | Roger Parnell | United States | 15.86 |
| M60 100 meters hurdles 33"; Wind: -0.3 | 3rd place, bronze medalist(s) | Sylwester Lorenz | Poland | 16.51 |

=== 110 meters hurdles ===
| Event | Pos | Athlete | Country | Result |
|---|---|---|---|---|
M35 110 meters hurdles 39"; Wind: -0.5
| M35 110 meters hurdles 39"; Wind: -0.5 | 1st place, gold medalist(s) | Robert Price | United States | 15.29 |
| M35 110 meters hurdles 39"; Wind: -0.5 | 2nd place, silver medalist(s) | Doug McLaren | Canada | 15.35 |
| M35 110 meters hurdles 39"; Wind: -0.5 | 3rd place, bronze medalist(s) | Stefan Rackwitz | Germany | 15.76 |
M40 110 meters hurdles 39"; Wind: -2.0
| M40 110 meters hurdles 39"; Wind: -2.0 | 1st place, gold medalist(s) | Michael Godbout | United States | 14.37 |
| M40 110 meters hurdles 39"; Wind: -2.0 | 2nd place, silver medalist(s) | Derek Pye | United States | 14.68 |
| M40 110 meters hurdles 39"; Wind: -2.0 | 3rd place, bronze medalist(s) | Don Drummond | United States | 15.16 |
M45 110 meters hurdles 39"; Wind: -2.9
| M45 110 meters hurdles 39"; Wind: -2.9 | 1st place, gold medalist(s) | David Ashford | United States | 15.37 |
| M45 110 meters hurdles 39"; Wind: -2.9 | 2nd place, silver medalist(s) | Henry Andrade | United States | 15.90 |
| M45 110 meters hurdles 39"; Wind: -2.9 | 3rd place, bronze medalist(s) | Howard Lindsay | Netherlands Antilles | 17.27 |

=== 200 meters hurdles ===
| Event | Pos | Athlete | Country | Result |
|---|---|---|---|---|
W70 200 meters hurdles Wind: -1.3
| W70 200 meters hurdles Wind: -1.3 | 1st place, gold medalist(s) | Erika Sauer | Germany | 40.60 |
| W70 200 meters hurdles Wind: -1.3 | 2nd place, silver medalist(s) | Noriko Nakamura | Japan | 41.87 |
| W70 200 meters hurdles Wind: -1.3 | 3rd place, bronze medalist(s) | Becky Sisley | United States | 43.95 |
W75 200 meters hurdles Wind: -2.2
| W75 200 meters hurdles Wind: -2.2 | 1st place, gold medalist(s) | Barbara Jordan | United States | 41.71 WR |
| W75 200 meters hurdles Wind: -2.2 | 2nd place, silver medalist(s) | Florence Meiler | United States | 43.83 |
M80 200 meters hurdles Wind: -1.8
| M80 200 meters hurdles Wind: -1.8 | 1st place, gold medalist(s) | Earl Fee | Canada | 37.31 |
| M80 200 meters hurdles Wind: -1.8 | 2nd place, silver medalist(s) | Jerzy Przyborowski | Poland | 43.28 |
| M80 200 meters hurdles Wind: -1.8 | 3rd place, bronze medalist(s) | Willard Robinson | United States | 46.99 |
M85 200 meters hurdles Wind: -1.8
| M85 200 meters hurdles Wind: -1.8 | 1st place, gold medalist(s) | Hugo Ant Delgado Flores | Peru | 45.13 WR |

=== 300 meters hurdles ===
| Event | Pos | Athlete | Country | Result |
|---|---|---|---|---|
W50 300 meters hurdles
| W50 300 meters hurdles | 1st place, gold medalist(s) | Marie Kay | Australia | 46.07 |
| W50 300 meters hurdles | 2nd place, silver medalist(s) | Jane Horder | Great Britain | 47.59 |
| W50 300 meters hurdles | 3rd place, bronze medalist(s) | Kathleen Shook | United States | 51.17 |
W55 300 meters hurdles
| W55 300 meters hurdles | 1st place, gold medalist(s) | Maria Jesus Sanguos | Spain | 51.93 |
| W55 300 meters hurdles | 2nd place, silver medalist(s) | Carole Filer | Great Britain | 52.85 |
| W55 300 meters hurdles | 3rd place, bronze medalist(s) | Vilma Paris Millan | Puerto Rico | 55.31 |
W60 300 meters hurdles
| W60 300 meters hurdles | 1st place, gold medalist(s) | Marja Metsankyla | Finland | 53.75 |
| W60 300 meters hurdles | 2nd place, silver medalist(s) | Terhi Kokkonen | Finland | 55.14 |
| W60 300 meters hurdles | 3rd place, bronze medalist(s) | Stephanie Claassen | South Africa | 1:00.04 |
W65 300 meters hurdles
| W65 300 meters hurdles | 1st place, gold medalist(s) | Marge Allison | Australia | 54.06 WR |
| W65 300 meters hurdles | 2nd place, silver medalist(s) | Oddbjoerg Haakensveen | Norway | 58.32 |
| W65 300 meters hurdles | 3rd place, bronze medalist(s) | Hiroko Miyamoto | Japan | 1:15.35 |
M60 300 meters hurdles
| M60 300 meters hurdles | 1st place, gold medalist(s) | Thaddeus Wilson | United States | 45.42 |
| M60 300 meters hurdles | 2nd place, silver medalist(s) | Rick Lapp | United States | 46.16 |
| M60 300 meters hurdles | 3rd place, bronze medalist(s) | Antonio Montaruli | Italy | 48.83 |
M65 300 meters hurdles
| M65 300 meters hurdles | 1st place, gold medalist(s) | Antonio Fortunato | Portugal | 49.43 |
| M65 300 meters hurdles | 2nd place, silver medalist(s) | Harri Suominen | Finland | 49.60 |
| M65 300 meters hurdles | 3rd place, bronze medalist(s) | Jelle Van der Schaaf | Netherlands | 49.91 |
M70 300 meters hurdles
| M70 300 meters hurdles | 1st place, gold medalist(s) | Michael Stevenson | Australia | 51.64 |
| M70 300 meters hurdles | 2nd place, silver medalist(s) | Michael De Stefano | United States | 51.92 |
| M70 300 meters hurdles | 3rd place, bronze medalist(s) | Hartmann Knorr | Germany | 52.87 |
M75 300 meters hurdles
| M75 300 meters hurdles | 1st place, gold medalist(s) | Andy Aadmi | Canada | 55.87 |
| M75 300 meters hurdles | 2nd place, silver medalist(s) | William Clark | United States | 56.85 |
| M75 300 meters hurdles | 3rd place, bronze medalist(s) | Anthony Bowman | Great Britain | 57.12 |

=== 400 meters hurdles ===
| Event | Pos | Athlete | Country | Result |
|---|---|---|---|---|
W35 400 meters hurdles
| W35 400 meters hurdles | 1st place, gold medalist(s) | Emanuela Baggiolini | Italy | 1:00.94 |
| W35 400 meters hurdles | 2nd place, silver medalist(s) | LaTrica Dendy | United States | 1:02.09 |
| W35 400 meters hurdles | 3rd place, bronze medalist(s) | Cari Soulabail-legendre | France | 1:02.76 |
W40 400 meters hurdles
| W40 400 meters hurdles | 1st place, gold medalist(s) | Lisa Daley | United States | 1:03.95 |
| W40 400 meters hurdles | 2nd place, silver medalist(s) | Corinne Pierre-joseph | France | 1:04.56 |
| W40 400 meters hurdles | 3rd place, bronze medalist(s) | Wanda Velazquez Roman | Puerto Rico | 1:05.28 |
W45 400 meters hurdles
| W45 400 meters hurdles | 1st place, gold medalist(s) | Virginia Mitchell | Great Britain | 1:05.65 |
| W45 400 meters hurdles | 2nd place, silver medalist(s) | Geraldine Finegan | Ireland | 1:06.75 |
| W45 400 meters hurdles | 3rd place, bronze medalist(s) | Karen Steen | United States | 1:10.48 |
M35 400 meters hurdles
| M35 400 meters hurdles | 1st place, gold medalist(s) | Robert Price | United States | 55.54 |
| M35 400 meters hurdles | 2nd place, silver medalist(s) | Ivan Gonzalez | Chile | 57.09 |
| M35 400 meters hurdles | 3rd place, bronze medalist(s) | Lyndell Pittman | United States | 1:01.08 |
M40 400 meters hurdles
| M40 400 meters hurdles | 1st place, gold medalist(s) | Winston Chambers | Jamaica | 55.53 |
| M40 400 meters hurdles | 2nd place, silver medalist(s) | Andreas Schulze | Germany | 56.23 |
| M40 400 meters hurdles | 3rd place, bronze medalist(s) | Don Drummond | United States | 56.78 |
M45 400 meters hurdles
| M45 400 meters hurdles | 1st place, gold medalist(s) | Getu Echeandia Gonzalez | Puerto Rico | 57 |
| M45 400 meters hurdles | 2nd place, silver medalist(s) | Jonathan Tilt | Great Britain | 59.68 |
| M45 400 meters hurdles | 3rd place, bronze medalist(s) | Roberto Amerio | Italy | 1:00.18 |
M50 400 meters hurdles
| M50 400 meters hurdles | 1st place, gold medalist(s) | Darnell Gatling | United States | 56.86 |
| M50 400 meters hurdles | 2nd place, silver medalist(s) | Peter Grimes | United States | 58.20 |
| M50 400 meters hurdles | 3rd place, bronze medalist(s) | James Roberson | United States | 1:00.87 |
M55 400 meters hurdles
| M55 400 meters hurdles | 1st place, gold medalist(s) | Alessandro Cipriani | Italy | 1:03.94 |
| M55 400 meters hurdles | 2nd place, silver medalist(s) | George Haywood | United States | 1:05.13 |
| M55 400 meters hurdles | 3rd place, bronze medalist(s) | Steve Cummings | United States | 1:06.40 |

=== 2000 meters steeplechase ===
| Event | Pos | Athlete | Country | Result |
|---|---|---|---|---|
W35 2K steeplechase
| W35 2K steeplechase | 1st place, gold medalist(s) | Angels Martinez Paya | Spain | 7:38.52 |
| W35 2K steeplechase | 2nd place, silver medalist(s) | Luz Angel Sanchez Vivas | Colombia | 7:42.28 |
| W35 2K steeplechase | 3rd place, bronze medalist(s) | Maria Domenica Manchia | Italy | 7:42.45 |
W40 2K steeplechase
| W40 2K steeplechase | 1st place, gold medalist(s) | Lisa Ryan | United States | 6:49.59 WR |
| W40 2K steeplechase | 2nd place, silver medalist(s) | Grace Padilla | United States | 6:55.56 |
| W40 2K steeplechase | 3rd place, bronze medalist(s) | Paola Olivari | Chile | 7:24.82 |
W45 2K steeplechase
| W45 2K steeplechase | 1st place, gold medalist(s) | Lisa Valle | United States | 6:58.89 |
| W45 2K steeplechase | 2nd place, silver medalist(s) | Geraldine Finegan | Ireland | 8:14.72 |
| W45 2K steeplechase | 3rd place, bronze medalist(s) | Zofia Wieciorkowska | Poland | 8:21.25 |
W50 2K steeplechase
| W50 2K steeplechase | 1st place, gold medalist(s) | Elisabeth Henn | Germany | 8:27.26 |
| W50 2K steeplechase | 2nd place, silver medalist(s) | Jeanine Overveld | Netherlands | 8:28.09 |
| W50 2K steeplechase | 3rd place, bronze medalist(s) | Betsy Seth | United States | 8:43.85 |
W55 2K steeplechase
| W55 2K steeplechase | 1st place, gold medalist(s) | Kathryn Martin | United States | 8:22.01 |
| W55 2K steeplechase | 2nd place, silver medalist(s) | Anne Darby | Great Britain | 9:32.25 |
| W55 2K steeplechase | 3rd place, bronze medalist(s) | Nancy Sweazey | Canada | 9:33.80 |
W60 2K steeplechase
| W60 2K steeplechase | 1st place, gold medalist(s) | Irene Rodriguez | Colombia | 9:31.99 |
| W60 2K steeplechase | 2nd place, silver medalist(s) | Irene Davey | Australia | 10:02.37 |
| W60 2K steeplechase | 3rd place, bronze medalist(s) | Heather Carr | Australia | 10:04.35 |
W65 2K steeplechase
| W65 2K steeplechase | 1st place, gold medalist(s) | Anne Lang | Australia | 10:49.86 |
| W65 2K steeplechase | 2nd place, silver medalist(s) | Miloslava Rocnakova | Czech Republic | 10:53.20 |
| W65 2K steeplechase | 3rd place, bronze medalist(s) | Fran Harris | Australia | 12:53.92 |
W75 2K steeplechase
| W75 2K steeplechase | 1st place, gold medalist(s) | Anne Martin | Great Britain | 11:40.62 |
| W75 2K steeplechase | 2nd place, silver medalist(s) | Dawn Cumming | New Zealand | 13:06.40 |
M60 2K steeplechase
| M60 2K steeplechase | 1st place, gold medalist(s) | Rolf Kongerskov | Denmark | 7:13.60 |
| M60 2K steeplechase | 2nd place, silver medalist(s) | Allan Mayfield | Australia | 7:18.10 |
| M60 2K steeplechase | 3rd place, bronze medalist(s) | Boris Roganov | Russia | 7:21.38 |
M65 2K steeplechase
| M65 2K steeplechase | 1st place, gold medalist(s) | Emilio de la Camara | Spain | 7:42.46 |
| M65 2K steeplechase | 2nd place, silver medalist(s) | Domingos Moreira | Portugal | 7:59.77 |
| M65 2K steeplechase | 3rd place, bronze medalist(s) | Ross Bolding | United States | 8:03.15 |
M70 2K steeplechase
| M70 2K steeplechase | 1st place, gold medalist(s) | Ron Robertson | New Zealand | 7:10.03 WR |
| M70 2K steeplechase | 2nd place, silver medalist(s) | Peter Sandery | Australia | 8:16.57 |
| M70 2K steeplechase | 3rd place, bronze medalist(s) | Jean-louis Esnault | France | 8:35.70 |
M75 2K steeplechase
| M75 2K steeplechase | 1st place, gold medalist(s) | David Carr | Australia | 9:36.09 |
| M75 2K steeplechase | 2nd place, silver medalist(s) | Francisco Vicente | Portugal | 10:02.88 |
| M75 2K steeplechase | 3rd place, bronze medalist(s) | Aksel Roste | Norway | 10:19.54 |
M80 2K steeplechase
| M80 2K steeplechase | 1st place, gold medalist(s) | Gunnar Linde | United States | 11:06.8 |
| M80 2K steeplechase | 2nd place, silver medalist(s) | Karel Matzner | Czech Republic | 11:47.3 |
| M80 2K steeplechase | 3rd place, bronze medalist(s) | Luis Torres Rosa | Puerto Rico | 12:31.8 |

=== 3000 meters steeplechase ===
| Event | Pos | Athlete | Country | Result |
|---|---|---|---|---|
W35 3K steeplechase
| W35 3K steeplechase | 1st place, gold medalist(s) | Ciaran Doherty | Ireland | 9:15.1 |
| W35 3K steeplechase | 2nd place, silver medalist(s) | Rau Fernandez-Hernandez | Spain | 9:33.2 |
| W35 3K steeplechase | 3rd place, bronze medalist(s) | Javier Sanz Sanfructuoso | Spain | 9:43.0 |
M40 3K steeplechase
| M40 3K steeplechase | 1st place, gold medalist(s) | Elarbi Khattabi | Morocco | 9:24.9 |
| M40 3K steeplechase | 2nd place, silver medalist(s) | Ivan Ivanov | United States | 9:25.6 |
| M40 3K steeplechase | 3rd place, bronze medalist(s) | Liam Collins | United States | 9:54.8 |
M45 3K steeplechase
| M45 3K steeplechase | 1st place, gold medalist(s) | Gilles Pelletier | France | 9:51.1 |
| M45 3K steeplechase | 2nd place, silver medalist(s) | Tobias Philander | South Africa | 10:08.9 |
| M45 3K steeplechase | 3rd place, bronze medalist(s) | Gilles Bourgeois | Canada | 10:22.5 |
M50 3K steeplechase
| M50 3K steeplechase | 1st place, gold medalist(s) | Chris Deighan | Canada | 10:27.1 |
| M50 3K steeplechase | 2nd place, silver medalist(s) | Manuel Salvador | Spain | 10:49.5 |
| M50 3K steeplechase | 3rd place, bronze medalist(s) | Stanislaw Lancucki | Poland | 10:53.7 |
M55 3K steeplechase
| M55 3K steeplechase | 1st place, gold medalist(s) | Martinus Van der Hoorn | Netherlands | 10:39.2 |
| M55 3K steeplechase | 2nd place, silver medalist(s) | Masao Sono | Japan | 11:04.5 |
| M55 3K steeplechase | 3rd place, bronze medalist(s) | Dale Campbell | United States | 11:13.3 |

=== 5000 meters race walk ===
| Event | Pos | Athlete | Country | Result |
|---|---|---|---|---|
W35 5K race walk
| W35 5K race walk | 1st place, gold medalist(s) | Bianca Schenker | Germany | 25:40.4 |
| W35 5K race walk | 2nd place, silver medalist(s) | Brit Schroter | Germany | 26:08.2 |
| W35 5K race walk | 3rd place, bronze medalist(s) | Nardene Hammond | Canada | 26:43.7 |
W40 5K race walk
| W40 5K race walk | 1st place, gold medalist(s) | Nyle Sunderland | New Zealand | 27:33.1 |
| W40 5K race walk | 2nd place, silver medalist(s) | Tamara Stevenson | United States | 28:04.7 |
| W40 5K race walk | 3rd place, bronze medalist(s) | Elena Bogdanovich | Russia | 31:19.3 |
W45 5K race walk
| W45 5K race walk | 1st place, gold medalist(s) | Joan Terry | United States | 26:05.3 |
| W45 5K race walk | 2nd place, silver medalist(s) | Kathryn Grimes | United States | 27:32.1 |
| W45 5K race walk | 3rd place, bronze medalist(s) | Maria Guzman Rodriguez | El Salvador | 28:49.4 |
W50 5K race walk
| W50 5K race walk | 1st place, gold medalist(s) | Lynette Ventris | Australia | 24:25.6 |
| W50 5K race walk | 2nd place, silver medalist(s) | Pam Tindal | Australia | 25:56.1 |
| W50 5K race walk | 3rd place, bronze medalist(s) | Maryanne Daniel | United States | 27:35.6 |
W55 5K race walk
| W55 5K race walk | 1st place, gold medalist(s) | Barbara Nell | South Africa | 27:05.1 |
| W55 5K race walk | 2nd place, silver medalist(s) | Johanna Flipsen | Canada | 27:49.2 |
| W55 5K race walk | 3rd place, bronze medalist(s) | Natali Marcenco | Italy | 28:44.0 |
W60 5K race walk
| W60 5K race walk | 1st place, gold medalist(s) | Heather Carr | Australia | 28:26.1 |
| W60 5K race walk | 2nd place, silver medalist(s) | Elizabeth Feldman | Australia | 31:02.3 |
| W60 5K race walk | 3rd place, bronze medalist(s) | Sue Hoskin | New Zealand | 31:23.3 |
W65 5K race walk
| W65 5K race walk | 1st place, gold medalist(s) | Pirjo Karetie | Finland | 31:59.4 |
| W65 5K race walk | 2nd place, silver medalist(s) | Kathleen Balser | United States | 33:40.6 |
| W65 5K race walk | 3rd place, bronze medalist(s) | Shirley Barber | New Zealand | 33:55.0 |
W70 5K race walk
| W70 5K race walk | 1st place, gold medalist(s) | Elton Richardson | United States | 31:53.6 |
| W70 5K race walk | 2nd place, silver medalist(s) | Louise Walters | United States | 32:13.5 |
| W70 5K race walk | 3rd place, bronze medalist(s) | Hildegard Vey | South Africa | 32:52.2 |
W75 5K race walk
| W75 5K race walk | 1st place, gold medalist(s) | Denise Leclerc | France | 34:33.2 |
| W75 5K race walk | 2nd place, silver medalist(s) | Shirley Dockstader | United States | 36:33.1 |
| W75 5K race walk | 3rd place, bronze medalist(s) | Jean Horne | Canada | 37:17.9 |
W80 5K race walk
| W80 5K race walk | 1st place, gold medalist(s) | Ruth Carrier | Canada | 43:32.4 |
| W80 5K race walk | 2nd place, silver medalist(s) | Claire Elkins | United States | 44:53.8 |
| W80 5K race walk | 3rd place, bronze medalist(s) | Grace Moremen | United States | 45:02.7 |
W85 5K race walk
| W85 5K race walk | 1st place, gold medalist(s) | Athanasia Thomas | United States | 46:08.9 |
W90 5K race walk
| W90 5K race walk | 1st place, gold medalist(s) | Maria vda de Banue Ramirez | Mexico | 52:54.2 |
M35 5K race walk
| M35 5K race walk | 1st place, gold medalist(s) | Etiel Soto Maldonado | Mexico | 21:53.7 |
| M35 5K race walk | 2nd place, silver medalist(s) | Dmitry Babenko | Russia | 24:20.2 |
| M35 5K race walk | 3rd place, bronze medalist(s) | David Durand-Pichard | France | 25:20.7 |
M40 5K race walk
| M40 5K race walk | 1st place, gold medalist(s) | Luis Silva | Portugal | 21:27.5 |
| M40 5K race walk | 2nd place, silver medalist(s) | Jorge Lorefice | Argentina | 21:41.4 |
| M40 5K race walk | 3rd place, bronze medalist(s) | James Seid-Christmass | Australia | 24:49.7 |
M45 5K race walk
| M45 5K race walk | 1st place, gold medalist(s) | Royce Banda | Mexico | 23:11.1 |
| M45 5K race walk | 2nd place, silver medalist(s) | Dick Gnauck | Germany | 23:35.1 |
| M45 5K race walk | 3rd place, bronze medalist(s) | Jianping Xu | Canada | 24:08.6 |
M50 5K race walk
| M50 5K race walk | 1st place, gold medalist(s) | Guadalupe De Los Angeles | Mexico | 23:43.4 |
| M50 5K race walk | 2nd place, silver medalist(s) | Uwe Schroter | Germany | 24:33.5 |
| M50 5K race walk | 3rd place, bronze medalist(s) | Major Ferenc | Hungary | 25:23.2 |
M55 5K race walk
| M55 5K race walk | 1st place, gold medalist(s) | Jonathan Matthews | United States | 22:33.5 |
| M55 5K race walk | 2nd place, silver medalist(s) | Anatoly Shipitsyn | Russia | 23:52.5 |
| M55 5K race walk | 3rd place, bronze medalist(s) | Mike Parker | New Zealand | 24:09.0 |
M60 5K race walk
| M60 5K race walk | 1st place, gold medalist(s) | Graziano Morotti | Italy | 24:09.7 |
| M60 5K race walk | 2nd place, silver medalist(s) | José Luis López Camarena | Mexico | 24:28.0 |
| M60 5K race walk | 3rd place, bronze medalist(s) | Ian Richards | Great Britain | 24:41.7 |
M65 5K race walk
| M65 5K race walk | 1st place, gold medalist(s) | Andrew Jamieson | Australia | 25:57.7 |
| M65 5K race walk | 2nd place, silver medalist(s) | Marcel Jobin | Canada | 27:41.9 |
| M65 5K race walk | 3rd place, bronze medalist(s) | Michael Budnik | United States | 28:06.6 |
M70 5K race walk
| M70 5K race walk | 1st place, gold medalist(s) | Hermann Ing.Strieder | Austria | 29:28.1 |
| M70 5K race walk | 2nd place, silver medalist(s) | Aglya Kuchumor | Russia | 29:58.4 |
| M70 5K race walk | 3rd place, bronze medalist(s) | Einari Vainikka | Finland | 30:07.1 |
M75 5K race walk
| M75 5K race walk | 1st place, gold medalist(s) | Alan Poisner | United States | 33:34.9 |
| M75 5K race walk | 2nd place, silver medalist(s) | Semen Tsukrov | Russia | 33:50.8 |
| M75 5K race walk | 3rd place, bronze medalist(s) | David Stevens | Great Britain | 34:13.7 |
M80 5K race walk
| M80 5K race walk | 1st place, gold medalist(s) | John Starr | United States | 36:41.4 |
| M80 5K race walk | 2nd place, silver medalist(s) | William Moremen | United States | 36:58.7 |
| M80 5K race walk | 3rd place, bronze medalist(s) | Sergio Augosto Michel Paoli | Dominican Republic | 37:21.7 |
M85 5K race walk
| M85 5K race walk | 1st place, gold medalist(s) | Kohsoh Amano | Japan | 38:09.6 |
| M85 5K race walk | 2nd place, silver medalist(s) | Sriramu Vallabhajosyula | India | 39:47.9 |
| M85 5K race walk | 3rd place, bronze medalist(s) | Richard Hansen | United States | 42:45.3 |
M90 5K race walk
| M90 5K race walk | 1st place, gold medalist(s) | Armand Estanol Dorantes | Mexico | 45:36.8 |

=== 10 Km race walk ===
| Event | Pos | Athlete | Country | Result |
|---|---|---|---|---|
W35 10K race walk
| W35 10K race walk | 1st place, gold medalist(s) | Bianca Schenker | Germany | 53:29.8 |
| W35 10K race walk | 2nd place, silver medalist(s) | Brit Schroter | Germany | 53:40.2 |
| W35 10K race walk | 3rd place, bronze medalist(s) | Nardene Hammond | Canada | 54:09.9 |
W40 10K race walk
| W40 10K race walk | 1st place, gold medalist(s) | Nyle Sunderland | New Zealand | 57:03.2 |
| W40 10K race walk | 2nd place, silver medalist(s) | Tamara Stevenson | United States | 57:35.5 |
| W40 10K race walk | 3rd place, bronze medalist(s) | Elena Bogdanovich | Russia | 02:52.5 |
W45 10K race walk
| W45 10K race walk | 1st place, gold medalist(s) | Kathryn Grimes | United States | 56:51.2 |
| W45 10K race walk | 2nd place, silver medalist(s) | Susan Brooke | Canada | 57:27.8 |
| W45 10K race walk | 3rd place, bronze medalist(s) | Maria Guzman Rodriguez | El Salvador | 00:03.5 |
W50 10K race walk
| W50 10K race walk | 1st place, gold medalist(s) | Lynette Ventris | Australia | 49:51.8 |
| W50 10K race walk | 2nd place, silver medalist(s) | Pam Tindal | Australia | 53:59.0 |
| W50 10K race walk | 3rd place, bronze medalist(s) | Carmen Garcia Frontons | Spain | 57:59.5 |
W55 10K race walk
| W55 10K race walk | 1st place, gold medalist(s) | Barbara Nell | South Africa | 54:58.3 |
| W55 10K race walk | 2nd place, silver medalist(s) | Johanna Flipsen | Canada | 56:53.5 |
| W55 10K race walk | 3rd place, bronze medalist(s) | Natali Marcenco | Italy | 58:29.3 |
W60 10K race walk
| W60 10K race walk | 1st place, gold medalist(s) | Heather Carr | Australia | 57:19.4 |
| W60 10K race walk | 2nd place, silver medalist(s) | Marianne Martino | United States | 1:01:53.5 |
| W60 10K race walk | 3rd place, bronze medalist(s) | Elizabeth Feldman | Australia | 1:02:10.5 |
W65 10K race walk
| W65 10K race walk | 1st place, gold medalist(s) | Pirjo Karetie | Finland | 1:03:37.0 |
| W65 10K race walk | 2nd place, silver medalist(s) | Hatsue Matsumoto | Japan | 1:05:42.2 |
| W65 10K race walk | 3rd place, bronze medalist(s) | Judy Heller | United States | 1:06:32.2 |
W70 10K race walk
| W70 10K race walk | 1st place, gold medalist(s) | Elton Richardson | United States | 1:04:03.9 |
| W70 10K race walk | 2nd place, silver medalist(s) | Louise Walters | United States | 1:04:04.2 |
| W70 10K race walk | 3rd place, bronze medalist(s) | Hildegard Vey | South Africa | 1:05:43.9 |
W75 10K race walk
| W75 10K race walk | 1st place, gold medalist(s) | Shirley Dockstader | United States | 1:15:36.4 |
| W75 10K race walk | 2nd place, silver medalist(s) | Jean Horne | Canada | 1:15:57.2 |
| W75 10K race walk | 3rd place, bronze medalist(s) | Alicia Meza Gonzalez Meza | Mexico | 1:21:58.7 |
W80 10K race walk
| W80 10K race walk | 1st place, gold medalist(s) | Ruth Carrier | Canada | 1:27:18.4 |
| W80 10K race walk | 2nd place, silver medalist(s) | Grace Moremen | United States | 1:27:26.6 |
| W80 10K race walk | 3rd place, bronze medalist(s) | Claire Elkins | United States | 1:32:24.0 |
W90 10K race walk
| W90 10K race walk | 1st place, gold medalist(s) | Maria Ramirez vda de Banue | Mexico | 1:51:29.2 |
M35 10K race walk
| M35 10K race walk | 1st place, gold medalist(s) | Etiel Soto Maldonado | Mexico | 46:51.4 |
| M35 10K race walk | 2nd place, silver medalist(s) | Dmitry Babenko | Russia | 48:30.6 |
| M35 10K race walk | 3rd place, bronze medalist(s) | David Durand-Pichard | France | 51:23.1 |
M40 10K race walk
| M40 10K race walk | 1st place, gold medalist(s) | Luis Silva | Portugal | 44:41.1 |
| M40 10K race walk | 2nd place, silver medalist(s) | Stuart Kollmorgen | Australia | 47:27.8 |
| M40 10K race walk | 3rd place, bronze medalist(s) | Hakan Caliskan | Turkey | 51:40.8 |
M45 10K race walk
| M45 10K race walk | 1st place, gold medalist(s) | Royce Banda | Mexico | 47:34.8 |
| M45 10K race walk | 2nd place, silver medalist(s) | Dick Gnauck | Germany | 48:46.6 |
| M45 10K race walk | 3rd place, bronze medalist(s) | Steffen Meyer | Germany | 49:22.8 |
M50 10K race walk
| M50 10K race walk | 1st place, gold medalist(s) | Guadalupe De Los Angeles | Mexico | 50:07.2 |
| M50 10K race walk | 2nd place, silver medalist(s) | Uwe Schroter | Germany | 51:08.5 |
| M50 10K race walk | 3rd place, bronze medalist(s) | Major Ferenc | Hungary | 51:38.0 |
M55 10K race walk
| M55 10K race walk | 1st place, gold medalist(s) | Jonathan Matthews | United States | 46:55.5 |
| M55 10K race walk | 2nd place, silver medalist(s) | Anatoly Shipitsyn | Russia | 49:24.3 |
| M55 10K race walk | 3rd place, bronze medalist(s) | Colin Heywood | Australia | 50:11.8 |
M60 10K race walk
| M60 10K race walk | 1st place, gold medalist(s) | Graziano Morotti | Italy | 49:33.1 |
| M60 10K race walk | 2nd place, silver medalist(s) | José Luis López Camarena | Mexico | 49:50.8 |
| M60 10K race walk | 3rd place, bronze medalist(s) | Ian Richards | Great Britain | 50:01.3 |
M65 10K race walk
| M65 10K race walk | 1st place, gold medalist(s) | Andrew Jamieson | Australia | 50:11.4 |
| M65 10K race walk | 2nd place, silver medalist(s) | Marcel Jobin | Canada | 55:50.8 |
| M65 10K race walk | 3rd place, bronze medalist(s) | Russell Dickenson | Australia | 56:01.5 |
M70 10K race walk
| M70 10K race walk | 1st place, gold medalist(s) | Hermann Ing.Strieder | Austria | 58:56.0 |
| M70 10K race walk | 2nd place, silver medalist(s) | Aglya Kuchumor | Russia | 59:22.7 |
| M70 10K race walk | 3rd place, bronze medalist(s) | Edmund Shillabeer | Great Britain | 1:00:06.4 |
M75 10K race walk
| M75 10K race walk | 1st place, gold medalist(s) | Alan Poisner | United States | 1:07:25.9 |
| M75 10K race walk | 2nd place, silver medalist(s) | Semen Tsukrov | Russia | 1:07:31.7 |
| M75 10K race walk | 3rd place, bronze medalist(s) | Carlos Acosta | United States | 1:08:46.1 |
M80 10K race walk
| M80 10K race walk | 1st place, gold medalist(s) | John Starr | United States | 1:11:22.6 |
| M80 10K race walk | 2nd place, silver medalist(s) | William Moremen | United States | 1:14:19.9 |
| M80 10K race walk | 3rd place, bronze medalist(s) | Sergio Augosto Michel Paoli | Dominican Republic | 1:17:32.2 |
M85 10K race walk
| M85 10K race walk | 1st place, gold medalist(s) | Kohsoh Amano | Japan | 1:19:46.5 |
| M85 10K race walk | 2nd place, silver medalist(s) | Sriramu Vallabhajosyula | India | 1:21:22.4 |
| M85 10K race walk | 3rd place, bronze medalist(s) | Richard Hansen | United States | 1:27:54.1 |

=== 20 Km race walk ===
| Event | Pos | Athlete | Country | Result |
|---|---|---|---|---|
W35 20K race walk
| W35 20K race walk | 1st place, gold medalist(s) | Bianca Schenker | Germany | 1:51:33.1 |
| W35 20K race walk | 2nd place, silver medalist(s) | Nardene Hammond | Canada | 1:53:53.2 |
| W35 20K race walk | 3rd place, bronze medalist(s) | Brit Schroter | Germany | 1:56:54.9 |
W40 20K race walk
| W40 20K race walk | 1st place, gold medalist(s) | Nyle Sunderland | New Zealand | 1:56:54.2 |
| W40 20K race walk | 2nd place, silver medalist(s) | Tamara Stevenson | United States | 2:00:37.2 |
| W40 20K race walk | 3rd place, bronze medalist(s) | Flor Rivera Lopez | Mexico | 2:34:39.8 |
W45 20K race walk
| W45 20K race walk | 1st place, gold medalist(s) | Kathryn Grimes | United States | 2:01:24.1 |
| W45 20K race walk | 2nd place, silver medalist(s) | Susan Brooke | Canada | 2:02:50.3 |
| W45 20K race walk | 3rd place, bronze medalist(s) | Maria Guzman Rodriguez | El Salvador | 2:08:05.9 |
W50 20K race walk
| W50 20K race walk | 1st place, gold medalist(s) | Lynette Ventris | Australia | 1:42:19.4 |
| W50 20K race walk | 2nd place, silver medalist(s) | Pam Tindal | Australia | 2:01:03.7 |
| W50 20K race walk | 3rd place, bronze medalist(s) | Monica Risk | South Africa | 2:04:43.3 |
W55 20K race walk
| W55 20K race walk | 1st place, gold medalist(s) | Barbara Nell | South Africa | 1:56:46.2 |
| W55 20K race walk | 2nd place, silver medalist(s) | Natali Marcenco | Italy | 2:07:36.2 |
| W55 20K race walk | 3rd place, bronze medalist(s) | Debbie Topham | United States | 2:08:17.8 |
W60 20K race walk
| W60 20K race walk | 1st place, gold medalist(s) | Heather Carr | Australia | 1:58:11.2 |
| W60 20K race walk | 2nd place, silver medalist(s) | Elizabeth Feldman | Australia | 2:10:34.2 |
| W60 20K race walk | 3rd place, bronze medalist(s) | Sue Hoskin | New Zealand | 2:12:00.4 |
W65 20K race walk
| W65 20K race walk | 1st place, gold medalist(s) | Pirjo Karetie | Finland | 2:14:19.9 |
| W65 20K race walk | 2nd place, silver medalist(s) | Hatsue Matsumoto | Japan | 2:17:01.4 |
| W65 20K race walk | 3rd place, bronze medalist(s) | Kathleen Balser | United States | 2:19:06.3 |
W70 20K race walk
| W70 20K race walk | 1st place, gold medalist(s) | Louise Walters | United States | 2:13:30.1 |
| W70 20K race walk | 2nd place, silver medalist(s) | Elton Richardson | United States | 2:15:41.3 |
| W70 20K race walk | 3rd place, bronze medalist(s) | Hildegard Vey | South Africa | 2:15:42.6 |
M35 20K race walk
| M35 20K race walk | 1st place, gold medalist(s) | Maldonado Soto | Mexico | 1:35:08.8 |
| M35 20K race walk | 2nd place, silver medalist(s) | Dmitry Babenko | Russia | 1:43:13.4 |
| M35 20K race walk | 3rd place, bronze medalist(s) | David Durand-Pichard | France | 1:50:49.5 |
M40 20K race walk
| M40 20K race walk | 1st place, gold medalist(s) | Stuart Kollmorgen | Australia | 1:41:34.8 |
| M40 20K race walk | 2nd place, silver medalist(s) | Hakan Caliskan | Turkey | 1:49:16.5 |
| M40 20K race walk | 3rd place, bronze medalist(s) | Pasquale D'Orlando | Italy | 1:50:50.8 |
M45 20K race walk
| M45 20K race walk | 1st place, gold medalist(s) | Royce Banda | Mexico | 1:39:36.1 |
| M45 20K race walk | 2nd place, silver medalist(s) | Dick Gnauck | Germany | 1:40:39.2 |
| M45 20K race walk | 3rd place, bronze medalist(s) | Sergio Gutierrez | Costa Rica | 1:43:31.2 |
M50 20K race walk
| M50 20K race walk | 1st place, gold medalist(s) | Uwe Schroter | Germany | 1:46:43.1 |
| M50 20K race walk | 2nd place, silver medalist(s) | Major Ferenc | Hungary | 1:49:00.8 |
| M50 20K race walk | 3rd place, bronze medalist(s) | De Los Angeles | Mexico | 1:50:52.3 |
M55 20K race walk
| M55 20K race walk | 1st place, gold medalist(s) | Jonathan Matthews | United States | 1:37:06.5 |
| M55 20K race walk | 2nd place, silver medalist(s) | Fabio Ruzzier | Slovenia | 1:43:40.4 |
| M55 20K race walk | 3rd place, bronze medalist(s) | Anatoly Shipitsyn | Russia | 1:44:13.7 |
M60 20K race walk
| M60 20K race walk | 1st place, gold medalist(s) | José Luis López Camarena | Mexico | 1:42:57.9 |
| M60 20K race walk | 2nd place, silver medalist(s) | Graziano Morotti | Italy | 1:44:37.0 |
| M60 20K race walk | 3rd place, bronze medalist(s) | Ian Richards | Great Britain | 1:47:21.8 |
M65 20K race walk
| M65 20K race walk | 1st place, gold medalist(s) | Andrew Jamieson | Australia | 1:42:56.8 |
| M65 20K race walk | 2nd place, silver medalist(s) | Russell Dickenson | Australia | 1:57:23.1 |
| M65 20K race walk | 3rd place, bronze medalist(s) | Norman Frable | United States | 1:58:49.1 |
M70 20K race walk
| M70 20K race walk | 1st place, gold medalist(s) | Edmund Shillabeer | Great Britain | 2:03:20.6 |
| M70 20K race walk | 2nd place, silver medalist(s) | Hermann Ing.Strieder | Austria | 2:04:11.8 |
| M70 20K race walk | 3rd place, bronze medalist(s) | Aglya Kuchumor | Russia | 2:07:16.4 |
M75 20K race walk
| M75 20K race walk | 1st place, gold medalist(s) | Semen Tsukrov | Russia | 2:20:47.3 |
| M75 20K race walk | 2nd place, silver medalist(s) | Carlos Acosta | United States | 2:22:11.9 |
| M75 20K race walk | 3rd place, bronze medalist(s) | Ray Everson | United States | 2:23:59.9 |
M80 20K race walk
| M80 20K race walk | 1st place, gold medalist(s) | John Starr | United States | 2:30:51.7 |
| M80 20K race walk | 2nd place, silver medalist(s) | William Moremen | United States | 2:36:33.3 |
| M80 20K race walk | 3rd place, bronze medalist(s) | Sergio Augosto Michel Paoli | Dominican Republic | 2:39:42.8 |
M85 20K race walk
| M85 20K race walk | 1st place, gold medalist(s) | Sriramu Vallabhajosyula | India | 2:50:06.0 |

=== 4 × 100 meters relay ===
| Event | Pos | Athlete | Country | Result |
|---|---|---|---|---|
| W75 4 × 100 meters relay | 1st place, gold medalist(s) | Irene Obera | United States | 1:10.19 WR |
| W75 4 × 100 meters relay | 1st place, gold medalist(s) | Barbara Jordan | United States | 1:10.19 WR |
| W75 4 × 100 meters relay | 1st place, gold medalist(s) | Christel Donley | United States | 1:10.19 WR |
| W75 4 × 100 meters relay | 1st place, gold medalist(s) | Florence Meiler | United States | 1:10.19 WR |
| M60 4 × 100 meters relay | 1st place, gold medalist(s) | Ralph Peterson | United States | 47.93 WR |
| M60 4 × 100 meters relay | 1st place, gold medalist(s) | Thaddeus Wilson | United States | 47.93 WR |
| M60 4 × 100 meters relay | 1st place, gold medalist(s) | Charles Allie | United States | 47.93 WR |
| M60 4 × 100 meters relay | 1st place, gold medalist(s) | Leo Sanders | United States | 47.93 WR |

=== 4 × 400 meters relay ===
| Event | Pos | Athlete | Country | Result |
|---|---|---|---|---|
| M50 4 × 400 meters relay | 1st place, gold medalist(s) | Michael Sullivan | United States | 3:31.76 WR |
| M50 4 × 400 meters relay | 1st place, gold medalist(s) | Corey Moody | United States | 3:31.76 WR |
| M50 4 × 400 meters relay | 1st place, gold medalist(s) | Darnell Gatling | United States | 3:31.76 WR |
| M50 4 × 400 meters relay | 1st place, gold medalist(s) | Ray A. Blackwell | United States | 3:31.76 WR |

=== 8000 meters cross country ===
| Event | Pos | Athlete | Country | Result |
|---|---|---|---|---|
W35 8K cross country
| W35 8K cross country | 1st place, gold medalist(s) | Maria Domenica Manchia | Italy | 29:45.81 |
| W35 8K cross country | 2nd place, silver medalist(s) | Jeanine James | France | 31:50.69 |
| W35 8K cross country | 3rd place, bronze medalist(s) | Latashia Key | United States | 33:31.38 |
Team
| Team | 1st place, gold medalist(s) | | Australia | 1:54:27.27 |
| Team | 2nd place, silver medalist(s) | | Colombia | 1:55:05.58 |
W40 8K cross country
| W40 8K cross country | 1st place, gold medalist(s) | Gloria Escareno Lopez | Mexico | 29:36.88 |
| W40 8K cross country | 2nd place, silver medalist(s) | Verity Breen | Australia | 31:13.23 |
| W40 8K cross country | 3rd place, bronze medalist(s) | Michelle Stevenson | Australia | 33:23.32 |
W45 8K cross country
| W45 8K cross country | 1st place, gold medalist(s) | Soledad Castro Soliño | Spain | 28:52.02 |
| W45 8K cross country | 2nd place, silver medalist(s) | Zola Pieterse | South Africa | 29:19.81 |
| W45 8K cross country | 3rd place, bronze medalist(s) | Susan Ridley | Great Britain | 29:23.47 |
Team
| Team | 1st place, gold medalist(s) | | Great Britain | 1:41:53.78 |
| Team | 2nd place, silver medalist(s) | | United States | 1:44:23.79 |
W50 8K cross country
| W50 8K cross country | 1st place, gold medalist(s) | Elena Shemyakina | United States | 31:36.07 |
| W50 8K cross country | 2nd place, silver medalist(s) | Joannie Siegler | United States | 32:19.81 |
| W50 8K cross country | 3rd place, bronze medalist(s) | Ashley Meyer | Venezuela | 32:21.83 |
Team
| Team | 1st place, gold medalist(s) | | United States | 1:44:09.74 |
W55 8K cross country
| W55 8K cross country | 1st place, gold medalist(s) | Kathryn Martin | United States | 32:52.43 |
| W55 8K cross country | 2nd place, silver medalist(s) | Anne Fischer | Germany | 33:07.08 |
| W55 8K cross country | 3rd place, bronze medalist(s) | Rosemary Roediger | Australia | 33:52.04 |
Team
| Team | 1st place, gold medalist(s) | | United States | 1:50:08.0 |
| Team | 2nd place, silver medalist(s) | | Australia | 1:51:07.7 |
| Team | 3rd place, bronze medalist(s) | | Mexico | 1:56:00.5 |
W60 8K cross country
| W60 8K cross country | 1st place, gold medalist(s) | Rosalind Tabor | Great Britain | 36:25.79 |
| W60 8K cross country | 2nd place, silver medalist(s) | Maria D. Galeana Morales | Mexico | 37:11.24 |
| W60 8K cross country | 3rd place, bronze medalist(s) | Jo Anne Rowland | United States | 39:54.34 |
Team
| Team | 1st place, gold medalist(s) | | Great Britain | 2:07:54.1 |
| Team | 2nd place, silver medalist(s) | | United States | 2:22:36.0 |
W65 8K cross country
| W65 8K cross country | 1st place, gold medalist(s) | Mizue Matsuda | Japan | 38:29.38 |
| W65 8K cross country | 2nd place, silver medalist(s) | Evelyn McNelis | Ireland | 39:35.38 |
| W65 8K cross country | 3rd place, bronze medalist(s) | Marisa Da Silva Cruz | Brazil | 40:54.51 |
Team
| Team | 1st place, gold medalist(s) | | Mexico | 2:20:24.2 |
W70 8K cross country
| W70 8K cross country | 1st place, gold medalist(s) | Joaquina Flores | Portugal | 40:12.74 |
| W70 8K cross country | 2nd place, silver medalist(s) | Zofia Turosz | Poland | 44:54.30 |
| W70 8K cross country | 3rd place, bronze medalist(s) | Jan Fleming | New Zealand | 49:20.12 |
Team
| Team | 1st place, gold medalist(s) | | United States | 2:38:20.8 |
W75 8K cross country
| W75 8K cross country | 1st place, gold medalist(s) | Anne Martin | Great Britain | 48:03.27 |
| W75 8K cross country | 2nd place, silver medalist(s) | Margarida Hochstatter | Brazil | 50:32.52 |
| W75 8K cross country | 3rd place, bronze medalist(s) | Mary Harada | United States | 51:49.58 |
W80 8K cross country
| W80 8K cross country | 1st place, gold medalist(s) | Lydia Frei | Switzerland | 21:02.46 |
M35 8K cross country
| M35 8K cross country | 1st place, gold medalist(s) | Robert Celinski | Poland | 26:22.61 |
| M35 8K cross country | 2nd place, silver medalist(s) | Fabrice Thiery | France | 26:44.00 |
| M35 8K cross country | 3rd place, bronze medalist(s) | Jose Yanes Q. | Venezuela | 27:53.24 |
Team
| Team | 1st place, gold medalist(s) | | Colombia | 1:27:32.44 |
| Team | 2nd place, silver medalist(s) | | Mexico | 1:28:52.17 |
| Team | 3rd place, bronze medalist(s) | | United States | 1:35:49.54 |
M40 8K cross country
| M40 8K cross country | 1st place, gold medalist(s) | Cesar Troncoso Troncoso | Argentina | 25:59.77 |
| M40 8K cross country | 2nd place, silver medalist(s) | Elarbi Khattabi | Morocco | 26:09.92 |
| M40 8K cross country | 3rd place, bronze medalist(s) | Daniel Andres Castro | Argentina | 26:12.34 |
Team
| Team | 1st place, gold medalist(s) | | United States | 1:24:42.67 |
| Team | 2nd place, silver medalist(s) | | Australia | 1:37:26.91 |
| Team | 3rd place, bronze medalist(s) | | Austria | 1:40:30.05 |
M45 8K cross country
| M45 8K cross country | 1st place, gold medalist(s) | Dov Kremer | Israel | 27:19.87 |
| M45 8K cross country | 2nd place, silver medalist(s) | Ken Ernst | United States | 28:06.95 |
| M45 8K cross country | 3rd place, bronze medalist(s) | Steffen Meyer | Germany | 28:22.32 |
Team
| Team | 1st place, gold medalist(s) | | United States | 1:26:53.67 |
| Team | 2nd place, silver medalist(s) | | Great Britain | 1:35:04.49 |
| Team | 3rd place, bronze medalist(s) | | Germany | 1:36:16.59 |
M50 8K cross country
| M50 8K cross country | 1st place, gold medalist(s) | Daniel King | United States | 27:48.74 |
| M50 8K cross country | 2nd place, silver medalist(s) | David Cannon | United States | 27:56.87 |
| M50 8K cross country | 3rd place, bronze medalist(s) | Brian Pilcher | United States | 28:01.96 |
Team
| Team | 1st place, gold medalist(s) | | United States | 1:23:47.57 |
| Team | 2nd place, silver medalist(s) | | Canada | 1:41:14.63 |
M55 8K cross country
| M55 8K cross country | 1st place, gold medalist(s) | Keith Bateman | Australia | 27:14.12 |
| M55 8K cross country | 2nd place, silver medalist(s) | José Ramírez Carmen | Colombia | 27:51.15 |
| M55 8K cross country | 3rd place, bronze medalist(s) | Michael Deegan | Great Britain | 28:33.91 |
Team
| Team | 1st place, gold medalist(s) | | United States | 1:29:18.03 |
| Team | 2nd place, silver medalist(s) | | Russia | 1:33:54.20 |
| Team | 3rd place, bronze medalist(s) | | Australia | 1:33:54.25 |
M60 8K cross country
| M60 8K cross country | 1st place, gold medalist(s) | David Oxland | Great Britain | 29:27.72 |
| M60 8K cross country | 2nd place, silver medalist(s) | John Herridge | Australia | 30:08.27 |
| M60 8K cross country | 3rd place, bronze medalist(s) | Terry McCluskey | United States | 30:14.04 |
Team
| Team | 1st place, gold medalist(s) | | Russia | 1:34:14.98 |
| Team | 2nd place, silver medalist(s) | | United States | 1:34:52.81 |
| Team | 3rd place, bronze medalist(s) | | Great Britain | 1:40:12.30 |
M65 8K cross country
| M65 8K cross country | 1st place, gold medalist(s) | Albert Andereqq | Switzerland | 30:41.49 |
| M65 8K cross country | 2nd place, silver medalist(s) | Emilio de la Camara | Spain | 31:22.02 |
| M65 8K cross country | 3rd place, bronze medalist(s) | Antonio Carboni | Italy | 31:33.78 |
Team
| Team | 1st place, gold medalist(s) | | Australia | 1:39:32.3 |
| Team | 2nd place, silver medalist(s) | | Brazil | 1:45:13.8 |
| Team | 3rd place, bronze medalist(s) | | United States | 1:50:36.8 |
M70 8K cross country
| M70 8K cross country | 1st place, gold medalist(s) | Ron Robertson | New Zealand | 32:09.96 |
| M70 8K cross country | 2nd place, silver medalist(s) | Peter Lessing | Germany | 33:29.55 |
| M70 8K cross country | 3rd place, bronze medalist(s) | Peter Sandery | Australia | 33:47.80 |
Team
| Team | 1st place, gold medalist(s) | | United States | 1:52:07.9 |
| Team | 2nd place, silver medalist(s) | | Germany | 1:57:05.0 |
| Team | 3rd place, bronze medalist(s) | | Australia | 2:26:43.3 |
M75 8K cross country
| M75 8K cross country | 1st place, gold medalist(s) | Francisco Vicente | Portugal | 35:30.30 |
| M75 8K cross country | 2nd place, silver medalist(s) | Bent Lauridsen | Denmark | 36:24.37 |
| M75 8K cross country | 3rd place, bronze medalist(s) | Manuel Rosales | Spain | 37:28.71 |
Team
| Team | 1st place, gold medalist(s) | | United States | 2:23:16.31 |
M80 8K cross country
| M80 8K cross country | 1st place, gold medalist(s) | Leon D'Erbee | Germany | 49:05.57 |
| M80 8K cross country | 2nd place, silver medalist(s) | Derek Howarth | Great Britain | 51:06.11 |
| M80 8K cross country | 3rd place, bronze medalist(s) | Irwin Barrett-Lennard | Australia | 53:10.14 |
Team
| Team | 1st place, gold medalist(s) | | Great Britain | 3:39:17.50 |
M85 8K cross country
| M85 8K cross country | 1st place, gold medalist(s) | Jose Canelo | Portugal | 1:00:25.12 |

=== Marathon ===
| Event | Pos | Athlete | Country | Result |
|---|---|---|---|---|
W35 Marathon
| W35 Marathon | 1st place, gold medalist(s) | Sara Gigliotti | United States | 3:00:42.2 |
| W35 Marathon | 2nd place, silver medalist(s) | Stacey Worthen | United States | 3:09:42.1 |
| W35 Marathon | 3rd place, bronze medalist(s) | Alicia Zorrilla | Panama | 3:23:30.2 |
W40 Marathon
| W40 Marathon | 1st place, gold medalist(s) | Annette Bednosky | United States | 3:01:29.5 |
| W40 Marathon | 2nd place, silver medalist(s) | Verity Breen | Australia | 3:07:25.4 |
| W40 Marathon | 3rd place, bronze medalist(s) | Veronica Acuna | Argentina | 3:13:43.1 |
W45 Marathon
| W45 Marathon | 1st place, gold medalist(s) | Sally Gibbs | New Zealand | 2:52:52.2 |
| W45 Marathon | 2nd place, silver medalist(s) | Kathy Wolski | United States | 3:03:18.4 |
| W45 Marathon | 3rd place, bronze medalist(s) | Rosalva Bonilla | United States | 3:14:58.3 |
W50 Marathon
| W50 Marathon | 1st place, gold medalist(s) | Mónica Regonesi | Chile | 3:10:52.7 |
| W50 Marathon | 2nd place, silver medalist(s) | Ashley Meyer | Venezuela | 3:16:25.0 |
| W50 Marathon | 3rd place, bronze medalist(s) | Ana Luisa Barrantes | Costa Rica | 3:19:38.6 |
W55 Marathon
| W55 Marathon | 1st place, gold medalist(s) | Christine Kennedy | United States | 3:00:47.8 |
| W55 Marathon | 2nd place, silver medalist(s) | Hongyun Jin | United States | 3:19:10.8 |
| W55 Marathon | 3rd place, bronze medalist(s) | Anne Fischer | Germany | 3:36:07.6 |
W60 Marathon
| W60 Marathon | 1st place, gold medalist(s) | Luisa Rivas | Chile | 3:23:22.2 |
| W60 Marathon | 2nd place, silver medalist(s) | Nancy Rollins | United States | 3:36:14.5 |
| W60 Marathon | 3rd place, bronze medalist(s) | Janet Cain | United States | 3:37:23.9 |
W65 Marathon
| W65 Marathon | 1st place, gold medalist(s) | Cecille Bordato | Jamaica | 5:03:09.2 |
W70 Marathon
| W70 Marathon | 1st place, gold medalist(s) | Marta Sarco | Argentina | 4:19:37.0 |
| W70 Marathon | 2nd place, silver medalist(s) | Satsuko Suzuki | Japan | 4:34:10.1 |
| W70 Marathon | 3rd place, bronze medalist(s) | Edilia Camargo | Panama | 5:48:51.9 |
W75 Marathon
| W75 Marathon | 1st place, gold medalist(s) | Janina Rosinska | Poland | 5:47:42.1 |
M35 Marathon
| M35 Marathon | 1st place, gold medalist(s) | Chad Worthen | United States | 2:35:53.4 |
| M35 Marathon | 2nd place, silver medalist(s) | Ronny Kristoffersen | Norway | 2:39:15.5 |
| M35 Marathon | 3rd place, bronze medalist(s) | Jason Harne | Great Britain | 2:43:48.2 |
M40 Marathon
| M40 Marathon | 1st place, gold medalist(s) | Tony Torres | United States | 2:32:29.2 |
| M40 Marathon | 2nd place, silver medalist(s) | Alfredo Norvello | Italy | 2:36:34.6 |
| M40 Marathon | 3rd place, bronze medalist(s) | Efren Ramirez-Castrillon | Colombia | 2:41:27.2 |
M45 Marathon
| M45 Marathon | 1st place, gold medalist(s) | Daniel Fiorini | Canada | 2:46:18.0 |
| M45 Marathon | 2nd place, silver medalist(s) | Luca Guiseppe Foglia | Switzerland | 2:47:15.0 |
| M45 Marathon | 3rd place, bronze medalist(s) | Jean Pommier | United States | 2:47:55.4 |
M50 Marathon
| M50 Marathon | 1st place, gold medalist(s) | Gavin Jones | Great Britain | 2:40:13.4 |
| M50 Marathon | 2nd place, silver medalist(s) | Martin Tighe | Great Britain | 2:40:36.3 |
| M50 Marathon | 3rd place, bronze medalist(s) | Uwe Bernd | Germany | 2:40:44.0 |
M55 Marathon
| M55 Marathon | 1st place, gold medalist(s) | Keith Bateman | Australia | 2:43:07.0 |
| M55 Marathon | 2nd place, silver medalist(s) | Marcelo Artero | Argentina | 2:44:20.1 |
| M55 Marathon | 3rd place, bronze medalist(s) | Gavin Stevens | New Zealand | 2:50:40.7 |
M60 Marathon
| M60 Marathon | 1st place, gold medalist(s) | Terry McCluskey | United States | 2:52:42.2 |
| M60 Marathon | 2nd place, silver medalist(s) | Antoni Cichonczuk | Poland | 2:56:49.1 |
| M60 Marathon | 3rd place, bronze medalist(s) | Mario Vargas | Chile | 3:01:49.9 |
M65 Marathon
| M65 Marathon | 1st place, gold medalist(s) | Gabriel Garcia | Brazil | 2:58:43.5 |
| M65 Marathon | 2nd place, silver medalist(s) | Meliton Bautista Carbarin Bautista | Mexico | 3:05:51.1 |
| M65 Marathon | 3rd place, bronze medalist(s) | Jose Arias | Spain | 3:17:21.5 |
M70 Marathon
| M70 Marathon | 1st place, gold medalist(s) | Hernan Barreneche Rios | Colombia | 3:17:16.7 |
| M70 Marathon | 2nd place, silver medalist(s) | Hans Schmid | United States | 3:39:02.9 |
| M70 Marathon | 3rd place, bronze medalist(s) | Werner Stocker | Germany | 3:44:28.7 |
M75 Marathon
| M75 Marathon | 1st place, gold medalist(s) | Manuel Rosales | Spain | 3:50:37.7 |
| M75 Marathon | 2nd place, silver medalist(s) | Bill Dodson | United States | 4:07:09.0 |
| M75 Marathon | 3rd place, bronze medalist(s) | Manuel Loverde | United States | 4:35:00.7 |
M80 Marathon
| M80 Marathon | 1st place, gold medalist(s) | Michio Kumamoto | Japan | 3:53:59.7 |
| M80 Marathon | 2nd place, silver medalist(s) | Keith Wood | United States | 4:46:52.5 |
| M80 Marathon | 3rd place, bronze medalist(s) | Leon D'Erbee | Germany | 4:58:49.9 |

=== Heptathlon ===
| Event | Pos | Athlete | Country | Result |
|---|---|---|---|---|
W35 Heptathlon
| W35 Heptathlon | 1st place, gold medalist(s) | Rachel Guest | United States | 2737 |
| W35 Heptathlon | 2nd place, silver medalist(s) | Barbara Muhr | Germany | 2455 |
| W35 Heptathlon | 3rd place, bronze medalist(s) | Marlett Watson | South Africa | 2275 |
W40 Heptathlon
| W40 Heptathlon | 1st place, gold medalist(s) | Tatjana Schilling | Germany | 3222 |
| W40 Heptathlon | 2nd place, silver medalist(s) | Carolina Sanz | Chile | 2906 |
| W40 Heptathlon | 3rd place, bronze medalist(s) | Louise Oliver | Great Britain | 2721 |
W45 Heptathlon
| W45 Heptathlon | 1st place, gold medalist(s) | Petra Bajeat | France | 3643 |
| W45 Heptathlon | 2nd place, silver medalist(s) | Geraldine Finegan | Ireland | 3243 |
| W45 Heptathlon | 3rd place, bronze medalist(s) | Maria Magdalena Molina | Costa Rica | 2728 |
W50 Heptathlon
| W50 Heptathlon | 1st place, gold medalist(s) | Marie Kay | Australia | 3809 |
| W50 Heptathlon | 2nd place, silver medalist(s) | Susanne Hedeager | Denmark | 3031 |
| W50 Heptathlon | 3rd place, bronze medalist(s) | Gaye Clarke | Great Britain | 2977 |
W55 Heptathlon
| W55 Heptathlon | 1st place, gold medalist(s) | Kay Glynn | United States | 3223 |
| W55 Heptathlon | 2nd place, silver medalist(s) | Gabriele Reppe | Germany | 3109 |
| W55 Heptathlon | 3rd place, bronze medalist(s) | Anna Matusova | Slovakia | 2688 |
W60 Heptathlon
| W60 Heptathlon | 1st place, gold medalist(s) | Phil Raschker | United States | 3619 |
| W60 Heptathlon | 2nd place, silver medalist(s) | Terhi Kokkonen | Finland | 3367 |
| W60 Heptathlon | 3rd place, bronze medalist(s) | Margaritha Dahler | Switzerland | 3060 |
W65 Heptathlon
| W65 Heptathlon | 1st place, gold medalist(s) | Marianna Maier | Austria | 3796 |
| W65 Heptathlon | 2nd place, silver medalist(s) | Cruyssen Vander | United States | 2915 |
| W65 Heptathlon | 3rd place, bronze medalist(s) | Grethe-Maren Myklestad | Norway | 2011 |
W70 Heptathlon
| W70 Heptathlon | 1st place, gold medalist(s) | Erika Sauer | Germany | 3200 |
| W70 Heptathlon | 2nd place, silver medalist(s) | Christa Bortignon | Canada | 3112 |
| W70 Heptathlon | 3rd place, bronze medalist(s) | Nelli Tomilova | Russia | 2583 |
W75 Heptathlon
| W75 Heptathlon | 1st place, gold medalist(s) | Florence Meiler | United States | 3549 |
| W75 Heptathlon | 2nd place, silver medalist(s) | Hiroko Mabuchi | Japan | 3427 |

=== Decathlon ===
| Event | Pos | Athlete | Country | Result |
|---|---|---|---|---|
M35 Decathlon
| M35 Decathlon | 1st place, gold medalist(s) | Jeferson Souza | Brazil | 3393 |
| M35 Decathlon | 2nd place, silver medalist(s) | Darren Dods | Great Britain | 3314 |
| M35 Decathlon | 3rd place, bronze medalist(s) | Eric Roso | France | 3181 |
M40 Decathlon
| M40 Decathlon | 1st place, gold medalist(s) | Christopher Gerhard | Germany | 3402 |
| M40 Decathlon | 2nd place, silver medalist(s) | Marek Wensel | United States | 3260 |
| M40 Decathlon | 3rd place, bronze medalist(s) | Mark Jeffery | Australia | 3253 |
M45 Decathlon
| M45 Decathlon | 1st place, gold medalist(s) | Douglas Rosado | Puerto Rico | 3788 |
| M45 Decathlon | 2nd place, silver medalist(s) | Christopher Bates | United States | 3691 |
| M45 Decathlon | 3rd place, bronze medalist(s) | Jerzy Krauze | Poland | 3670 |
M50 Decathlon
| M50 Decathlon | 1st place, gold medalist(s) | Kenneth Thomas | United States | 3771 |
| M50 Decathlon | 2nd place, silver medalist(s) | Saulius Svilainis | Lithuania | 3655 |
| M50 Decathlon | 3rd place, bronze medalist(s) | Knud Erik Pedersen | Denmark | 3603 |
M55 Decathlon
| M55 Decathlon | 1st place, gold medalist(s) | Dr. Georg Werthner | Austria | 3829 |
| M55 Decathlon | 2nd place, silver medalist(s) | David Kohls | United States | 3460 |
| M55 Decathlon | 3rd place, bronze medalist(s) | Klaus-Peter Neuendorf | Germany | 3414 |
M60 Decathlon
| M60 Decathlon | 1st place, gold medalist(s) | Dieter Langenbach | Germany | 4113 |
| M60 Decathlon | 2nd place, silver medalist(s) | Valdis Cela | Latvia | 3598 |
| M60 Decathlon | 3rd place, bronze medalist(s) | Georg Ortloff | Germany | 3588 |
M65 Decathlon
| M65 Decathlon | 1st place, gold medalist(s) | Ewald Richter | Germany | 3351 |
| M65 Decathlon | 2nd place, silver medalist(s) | Herbert Mattle | Switzerland | 3317 |
| M65 Decathlon | 3rd place, bronze medalist(s) | Fred Judson | Canada | 3256 |
M70 Decathlon
| M70 Decathlon | 1st place, gold medalist(s) | Flemming Orneborg | Denmark | 3749 |
| M70 Decathlon | 2nd place, silver medalist(s) | Heinz Keck | Germany | 3677 |
| M70 Decathlon | 3rd place, bronze medalist(s) | Gregor Strasshofer | Germany | 3479 |
M75 Decathlon
| M75 Decathlon | 1st place, gold medalist(s) | Nobuo Ishikawa | Japan | 3152 |
| M75 Decathlon | 2nd place, silver medalist(s) | Raúl López Barrera | Uruguay | 2955 |
| M75 Decathlon | 3rd place, bronze medalist(s) | Ernesto Minopoli | Italy | 2843 |
M80 Decathlon
| M80 Decathlon | 1st place, gold medalist(s) | Manfred Konopka | Germany | 2695 |
| M80 Decathlon | 2nd place, silver medalist(s) | Albert Erickson | United States | 2616 |
| M80 Decathlon | 3rd place, bronze medalist(s) | Zanichi Matsumoto | Japan | 2382 |
M85 Decathlon
| M85 Decathlon | 1st place, gold medalist(s) | Denver Smith | United States | 2965 |
| M85 Decathlon | 2nd place, silver medalist(s) | Dennis Sullivan | United States | 2849 |
| M85 Decathlon | 3rd place, bronze medalist(s) | Hiroshi Miyamoto | Japan | 2794 |
M90 Decathlon
| M90 Decathlon | 1st place, gold medalist(s) | Ralph Maxwell | United States | 3956 WR |

=== Throws pentathlon ===
| Event | Pos | Athlete | Country | Result |
|---|---|---|---|---|
W35 Throws pentathlon
| W35 Throws pentathlon | 1st place, gold medalist(s) | Catherine Madec | France | 3648 |
| W35 Throws pentathlon | 2nd place, silver medalist(s) | Andrea Jenkins | Great Britain | 3580 |
| W35 Throws pentathlon | 3rd place, bronze medalist(s) | Virginie Scribe | France | 3037 |
W40 Throws pentathlon
| W40 Throws pentathlon | 1st place, gold medalist(s) | Jane Thrush | Great Britain | 3216 |
| W40 Throws pentathlon | 2nd place, silver medalist(s) | Alena Shiman | Russia | 3152 |
| W40 Throws pentathlon | 3rd place, bronze medalist(s) | Susan Lawrence | Great Britain | 2866 |
W45 Throws pentathlon
| W45 Throws pentathlon | 1st place, gold medalist(s) | Gonny Mik | Netherlands | 4034 |
| W45 Throws pentathlon | 2nd place, silver medalist(s) | Christine McCahill | New Zealand | 3968 |
| W45 Throws pentathlon | 3rd place, bronze medalist(s) | Ingrid van Dijk | Netherlands | 3907 |
W50 Throws pentathlon
| W50 Throws pentathlon | 1st place, gold medalist(s) | Ulrike Engelhardt | Germany | 4563 |
| W50 Throws pentathlon | 2nd place, silver medalist(s) | Oneithea Lewis | United States | 4560 |
| W50 Throws pentathlon | 3rd place, bronze medalist(s) | Carol Finsrud | United States | 4250 |
W55 Throws pentathlon
| W55 Throws pentathlon | 1st place, gold medalist(s) | Anne K. Jensen | Denmark | 4101 |
| W55 Throws pentathlon | 2nd place, silver medalist(s) | Vlma Thompson | Great Britain | 3797 |
| W55 Throws pentathlon | 3rd place, bronze medalist(s) | Christel Junker | Germany | 3460 |
W60 Throws pentathlon
| W60 Throws pentathlon | 1st place, gold medalist(s) | Margarethe Tomanek | Netherlands | 4394 |
| W60 Throws pentathlon | 2nd place, silver medalist(s) | Inge Faldager | Denmark | 4171 |
| W60 Throws pentathlon | 3rd place, bronze medalist(s) | Mary Hartzler | United States | 4127 |
W65 Throws pentathlon
| W65 Throws pentathlon | 1st place, gold medalist(s) | Janice Banens | Australia | 3562 |
| W65 Throws pentathlon | 2nd place, silver medalist(s) | Sharon Raham | United States | 3370 |
| W65 Throws pentathlon | 3rd place, bronze medalist(s) | Grethe-Maren Myklestad | Norway | 3211 |
W70 Throws pentathlon
| W70 Throws pentathlon | 1st place, gold medalist(s) | Evaun Williams | Great Britain | 5418 |
| W70 Throws pentathlon | 2nd place, silver medalist(s) | Helvi Erikson | Estonia | 4295 |
| W70 Throws pentathlon | 3rd place, bronze medalist(s) | Margaret Tosh | Canada | 4277 |
W75 Throws pentathlon
| W75 Throws pentathlon | 1st place, gold medalist(s) | Christa Winkelmann | Germany | 3906 |
| W75 Throws pentathlon | 2nd place, silver medalist(s) | Valerie Worrell | Australia | 3707 |
| W75 Throws pentathlon | 3rd place, bronze medalist(s) | Myrtle Acton | Canada | 3564 |
W80 Throws pentathlon
| W80 Throws pentathlon | 1st place, gold medalist(s) | Rachel Hanssens | Netherlands | 4788 |
| W80 Throws pentathlon | 2nd place, silver medalist(s) | Maria San Martin | Uruguay | 3894 |
| W80 Throws pentathlon | 3rd place, bronze medalist(s) | Gloria Krug | United States | 3818 |
W90 Throws pentathlon
| W90 Throws pentathlon | 1st place, gold medalist(s) | Olga Kotelko | Canada | 4263 |
M35 Throws pentathlon
| M35 Throws pentathlon | 1st place, gold medalist(s) | Mark Landa | United States | 3718 |
| M35 Throws pentathlon | 2nd place, silver medalist(s) | Daniel Korhonen | Sweden | 3242 |
| M35 Throws pentathlon | 3rd place, bronze medalist(s) | Ignacio Calderon | Spain | 3216 |
M40 Throws pentathlon
| M40 Throws pentathlon | 1st place, gold medalist(s) | Martin Venter | South Africa | 4065 |
| M40 Throws pentathlon | 2nd place, silver medalist(s) | Steven Fritz | United States | 4008 |
| M40 Throws pentathlon | 3rd place, bronze medalist(s) | Otto Benczenleitner | Hungary | 3825 |
M45 Throws pentathlon
| M45 Throws pentathlon | 1st place, gold medalist(s) | Stephen Whyte | Great Britain | 4394 |
| M45 Throws pentathlon | 2nd place, silver medalist(s) | Stuart Gyngell | Australia | 4166 |
| M45 Throws pentathlon | 3rd place, bronze medalist(s) | Arnaud Dupuis | France | 3744 |
M50 Throws pentathlon
| M50 Throws pentathlon | 1st place, gold medalist(s) | Tom O. Jensen | Denmark | 4408 |
| M50 Throws pentathlon | 2nd place, silver medalist(s) | Randy Wilson | United States | 3633 |
| M50 Throws pentathlon | 3rd place, bronze medalist(s) | Saulius Svilainis | Lithuania | 3489 |
M55 Throws pentathlon
| M55 Throws pentathlon | 1st place, gold medalist(s) | John Goldhammer | United States | 4602 |
| M55 Throws pentathlon | 2nd place, silver medalist(s) | David Abernethy | Great Britain | 4051 |
| M55 Throws pentathlon | 3rd place, bronze medalist(s) | Jeffrey Baty | United States | 3670 |
M60 Throws pentathlon
| M60 Throws pentathlon | 1st place, gold medalist(s) | Arild Busterud | Norway | 4630 |
| M60 Throws pentathlon | 2nd place, silver medalist(s) | Lembit Talpsepp | Estonia | 4080 |
| M60 Throws pentathlon | 3rd place, bronze medalist(s) | Andrzej Piaczkowski | Poland | 3904 |
M65 Throws pentathlon
| M65 Throws pentathlon | 1st place, gold medalist(s) | Paul Economides | United States | 4357 |
| M65 Throws pentathlon | 2nd place, silver medalist(s) | Heimo Viertbauer | Austria | 3775 |
| M65 Throws pentathlon | 3rd place, bronze medalist(s) | Knud Hoyer | Denmark | 3770 |
M70 Throws pentathlon
| M70 Throws pentathlon | 1st place, gold medalist(s) | Ed Burke | United States | 4508 |
| M70 Throws pentathlon | 2nd place, silver medalist(s) | Czeslaw Roszczak | Poland | 4476 |
| M70 Throws pentathlon | 3rd place, bronze medalist(s) | Svein Hytten | Norway | 4402 |
M75 Throws pentathlon
| M75 Throws pentathlon | 1st place, gold medalist(s) | Thomas Hancock | Australia | 4290 |
| M75 Throws pentathlon | 2nd place, silver medalist(s) | Peter Speckens | Germany | 4245 |
| M75 Throws pentathlon | 3rd place, bronze medalist(s) | Marko Sluga | Slovenia | 3181 |
M80 Throws pentathlon
| M80 Throws pentathlon | 1st place, gold medalist(s) | Leo Saarinen | Finland | 4432 |
| M80 Throws pentathlon | 2nd place, silver medalist(s) | Zdenek Benek | Czech Republic | 4303 |
| M80 Throws pentathlon | 3rd place, bronze medalist(s) | Harvey Lewellen | United States | 4015 |
M85 Throws pentathlon
| M85 Throws pentathlon | 1st place, gold medalist(s) | Armas Rantala | Finland | 3814 |
M90 Throws pentathlon
| M90 Throws pentathlon | 1st place, gold medalist(s) | Philipp Frech | Germany | 3356 |
| M90 Throws pentathlon | 2nd place, silver medalist(s) | Idolf Sandahl | Sweden | 2962 |
| M90 Throws pentathlon | 3rd place, bronze medalist(s) | Seymour Lampert | United States | 2071 |

=== Pole vault ===
| Event | Pos | Athlete | Country | Result |
|---|---|---|---|---|
| M65 Pole vault | 1st place, gold medalist(s) | John Altendorf | United States | 3.84 WR |

=== Hammer throw ===
| Event | Pos | Athlete | Country | Result |
|---|---|---|---|---|
| W50 Hammer throw | 1st place, gold medalist(s) | Oneithea Lewis | United States | 55.46 WR |
| M95 Hammer throw | 1st place, gold medalist(s) | Antonio Antunes da Fonseca | Brazil | 22.01 WR |

=== Weight throw ===
| Event | Pos | Athlete | Country | Result |
|---|---|---|---|---|
| W50 Weight throw | 1st place, gold medalist(s) | Oneithea Lewis | United States | 18.76 WR |

=== Javelin throw ===
| Event | Pos | Athlete | Country | Result |
|---|---|---|---|---|
| M70 Javelin throw | 1st place, gold medalist(s) | Gary Stenlund | United States | 52.23 WR |
