= 2007 World Masters Athletics Championships =

Coordinates: 44.00247°N 12.63894°E

- Dates: 4 - 15 September 2007
- Host city: Riccione, Italy
- Venue: Stadio Italo Nicoletti
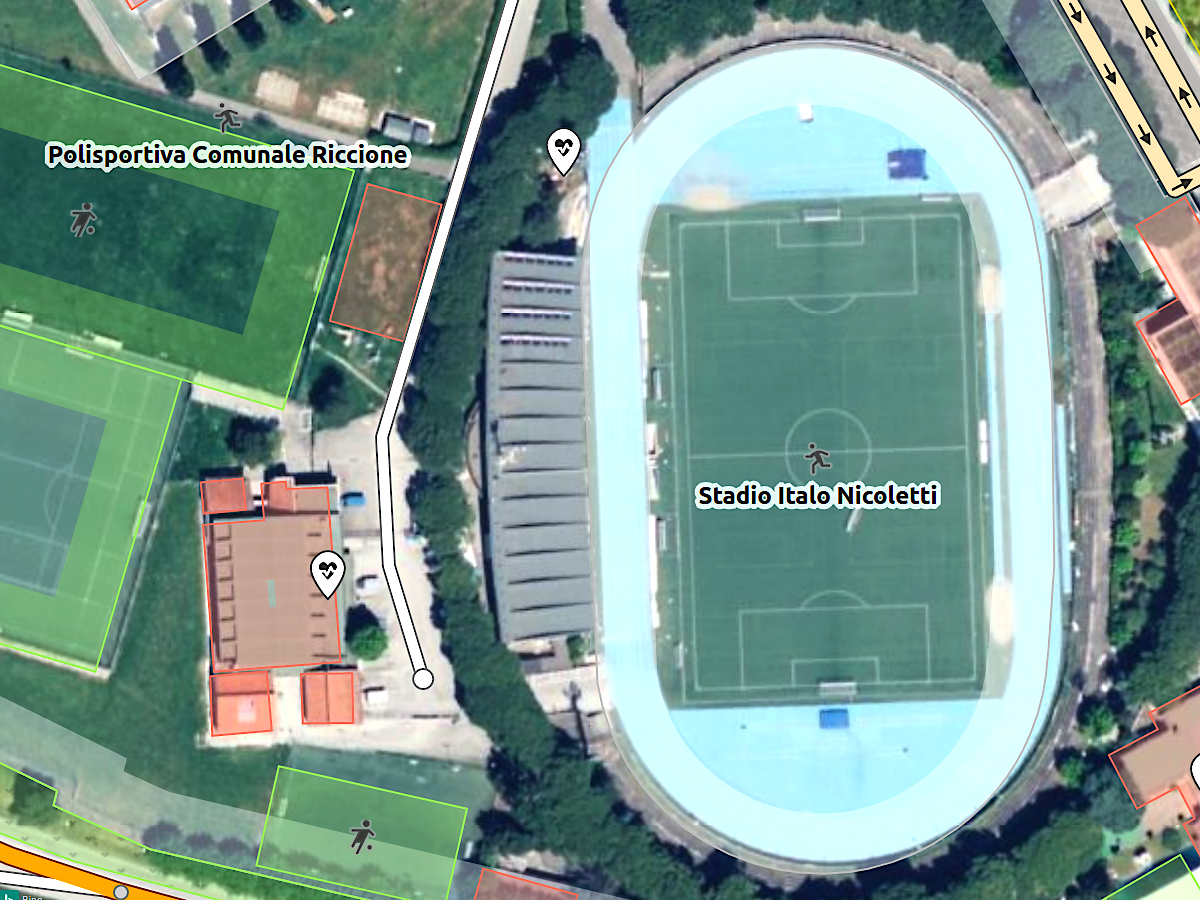
- Level: Masters
- Type: Outdoor
- Participation: 8946 athletes from 97 nations
- Official website: Archived 2007-06-13 at the Wayback Machine

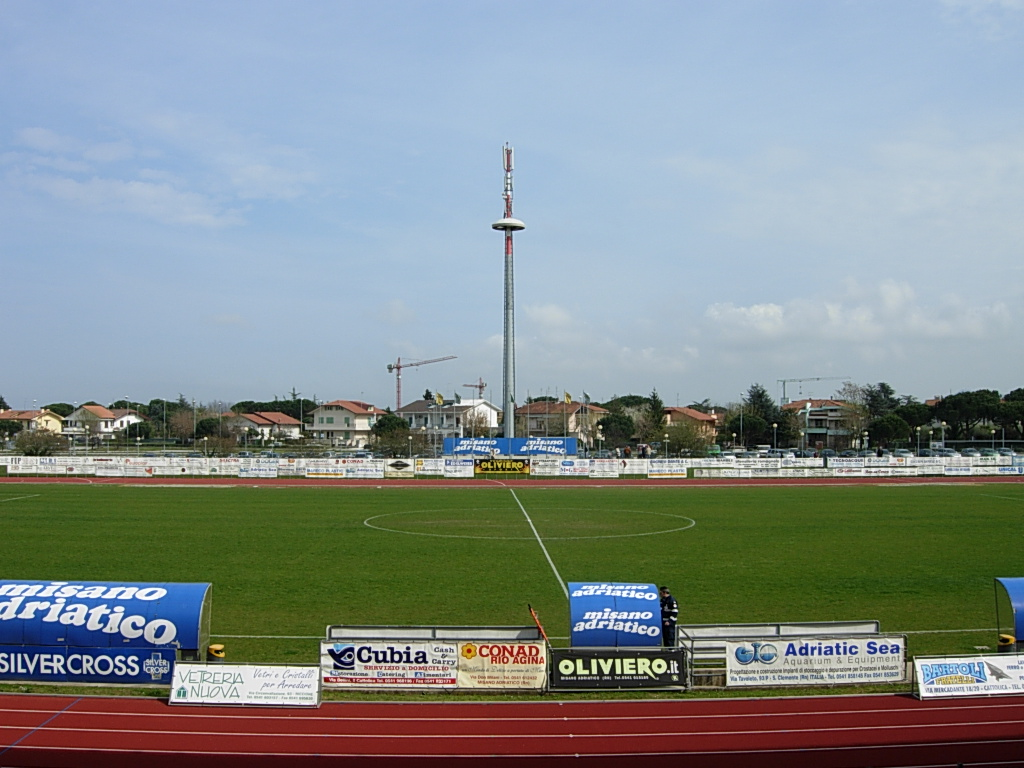
Stadio Comunale Santamonica

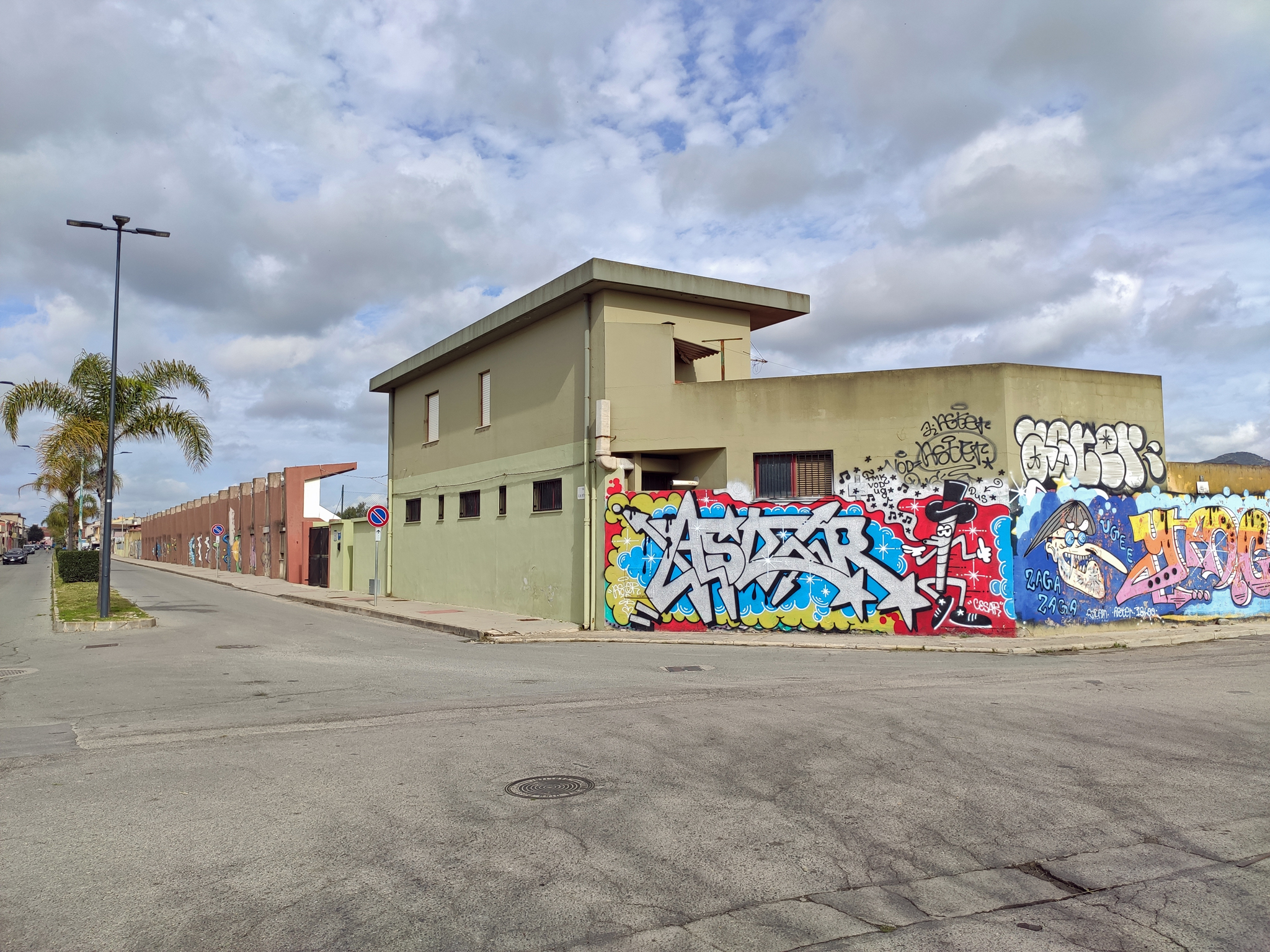
Stadio Comunale San Giovanni

2007 World Masters Athletics Championships is the seventeenth in a series of World Masters Athletics Outdoor Championships that took place in Riccione, Italy from 4 to 15 September 2007.

The main venue was Stadio Italo Nicoletti. Supplemental venues included Stadio Comunale Santamonica in Misano Adriatico and Stadio Comunale San Giovanni in San Giovanni in Marignano.

This Championships was organized by World Masters Athletics (WMA) in coordination with a Local Organising Committee (LOC): Lamberto Vacchi, Luca Verrascina and Francesco Arese.

The WMA is the global governing body of the sport of athletics for athletes 35 years of age or older, setting rules for masters athletics competition.

In addition to a full range of track and field events, non-stadia events included 8K Cross Country, 10K Race Walk (women), 20K Race Walk (men), and Marathon.

== World Records ==
Past Championships results are archived at WMA. Additional archives are available from British Masters Athletic Federation as a searchable pdf, from European Masters Athletics as a searchable pdf and from Museum of Masters Track & Field as a searchable pdf.

Masters world records set at this Championships are listed below.

Key: Wind aided

=== Women ===
Event	Athlete(s)	Nationality	Performance
W50 200 Meters	Marie Lande Mathieu	PUR	25.65
W50 400 Meters	Marie Lande Mathieu	PUR	57.66
W60 80 Meters Hurdles	Phil Raschker	USA	13.26
W65 80 Meters Hurdles	Nadine O'Connor	USA	14.31
W75 80 Meters Hurdles	Asta Larsson	SWE	19.76
W65 Triple Jump	Edith Graff	BEL	9.53
W70 Triple Jump	Christiane Schmalbruch	GER	8.46
W50 Discus Throw	Carol Finsrud	USA	45.67
W75 Discus Throw	Ingeborg Pfuller	ARG	25.07

=== Men ===
Event	Athlete(s)	Nationality	Performance
M90 100 Meters	Frederico Fischer	BRA	17.53
M90 200 Meters	Frederico Fischer	BRA	38.57
M95 200 Meters	Friederich Mahlo	GER	48.69
M70 300 Meters Hurdles	Tor Trondset	SWE	50.07
M55 4 x 100 Meters Relay	Walwyn Franklyn, Geoff Walcott, Alasdair Ross, Viv Oliver	GBR	46.16
M60 Hammer throw	Boris Zaychuk	CAN	61.96
M50 Javelin Throw	Luis Nogueira Fernandez	ESP	71.01
M90 Shot Put	Frederico Fischer	BRA	9.54
