= 2025 World Masters Athletics Indoor Championships =

Coordinates: 29.626890556085083°N 82.3947387812755°W

- Dates: 23-30 March 2025
- Host city: Gainesville, Florida, USA
- Venue: Alachua County Sports & Events Center
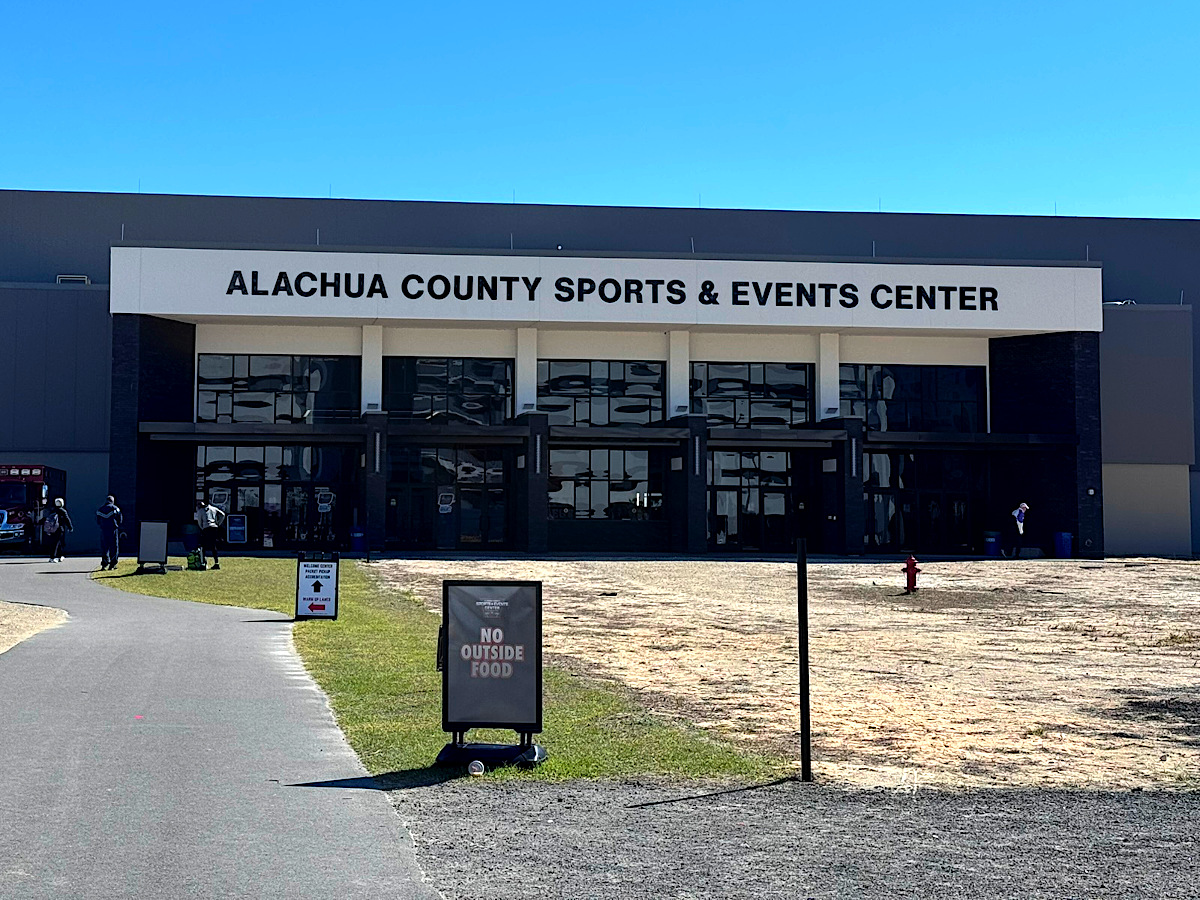
- Level: Masters
- Type: Indoor
- Participation: over 3,700 athletes from 98 nations
- Official website: https://wmaci2025.com/

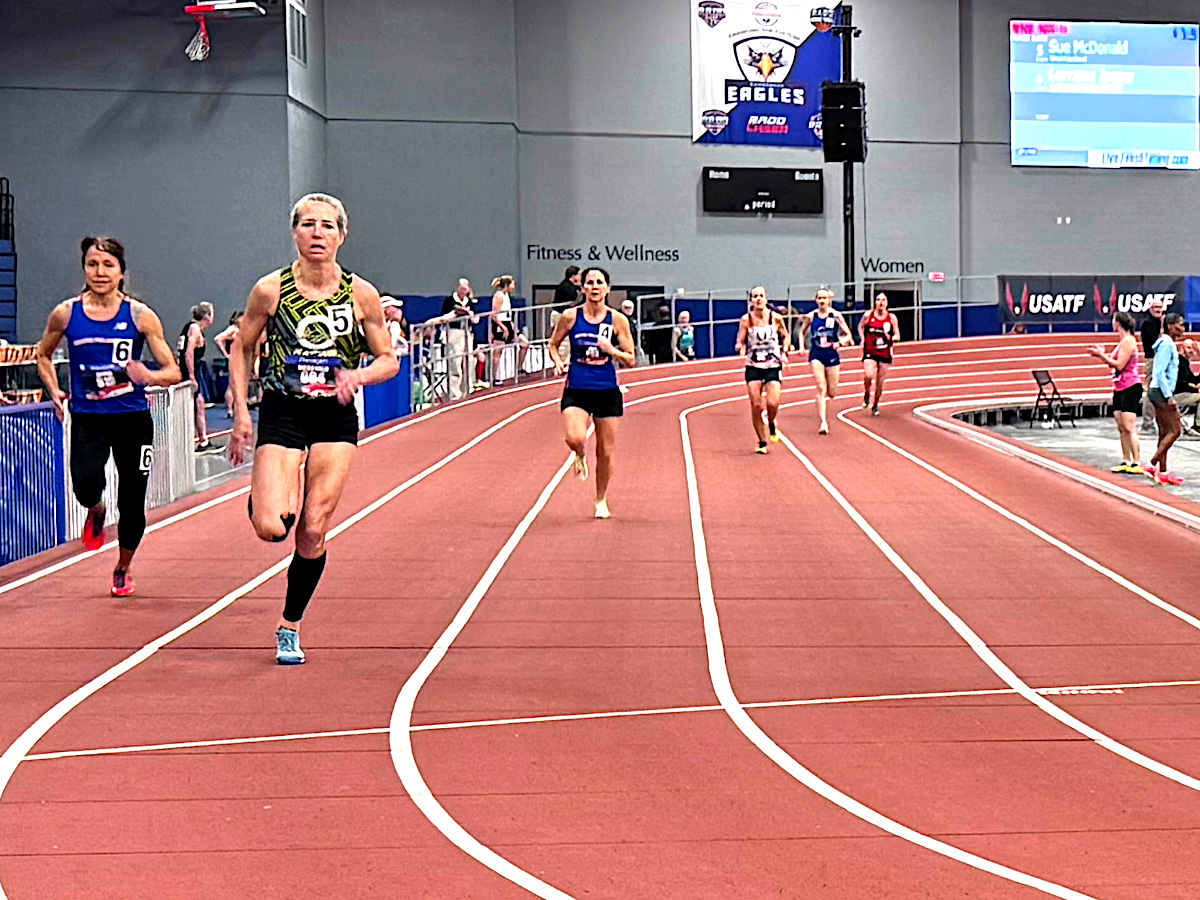
Indoor 6-lane banked track

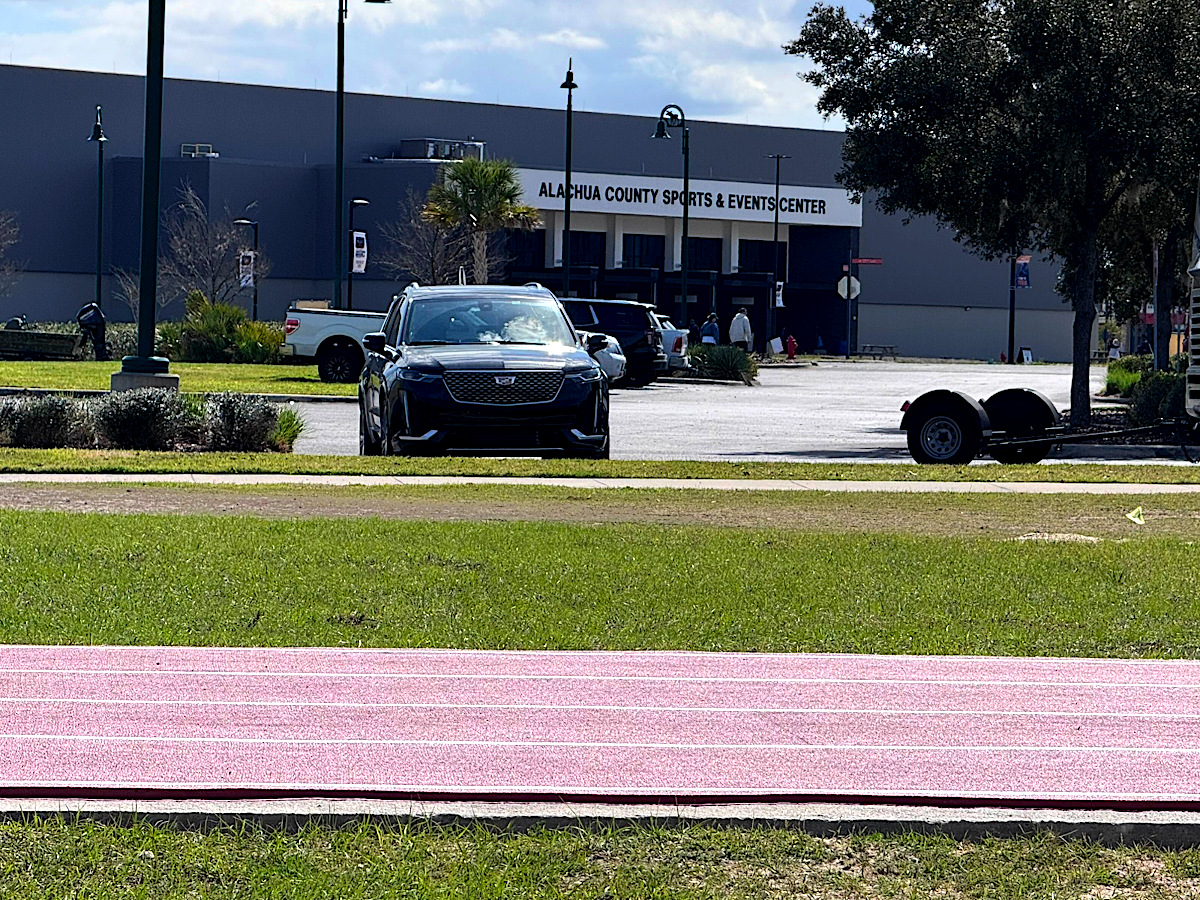
200-meter outdoor warmup track

2025 World Masters Athletics Indoor Championships is the tenth in a series of World Masters Athletics Indoor Championships (also called World Masters Athletics Championships Indoor, or WMACi). This is the first time in this series that the competition is held in the United States. This tenth edition took place in Gainesville, Florida, USA, from 23 to 30 March 2025.

The main venue is the newly constructed Alachua County Sports & Events Center, which had its opening on June 10, 2023, with the indoor track dedicated to the late Jimmy Carnes. It is a banked six-lane track where the turns are raised to neutralize the centrifugal force of athletes running the curves, and may be the fastest indoor track in the world. A site at West End hosts javelin throw, hammer throw and discus throw, as well as cross country. A 4-lane 200-meter outdoor straightaway warmup track is located less than a quarter mile from the Alachua County Sports & Events Center. Opening ceremonies included the customary Olympics-style Parade of Nations, with performances by the Gainesville Orchestra and Dance Alive National Ballet.

This Championships is organized by World Masters Athletics (WMA) in coordination with Alachua County Local Organizing Committee (LOC). The WMA is the global governing body of the sport of athletics for athletes 35 years of age or older, setting rules for masters athletics competition.

A full range of indoor track and field events were held, for a total of 24 events.

== World Records ==
Complete results were compiled by Half-Mile Timing, and summarized at WMACi2025. Official world records for each event are archived at WMA.

Several masters world records were set at this Indoor Championships; these are listed below.

=== Women ===
Event	Athlete(s)	Nationality	Performance
W90 60 Meters Hurdles	Florence Meiler	USA	23.62
W65 200 Meters	Marie-Lande Mathieu	PUR	29.40
W70 200 Meters	Wendy Alexis	CAN	30.33
W80 200 Meters	Carol LaFayette-Boyd	CAN	35.51
W50 400 Meters	Helen Hermundstad	USA	58.64
W55 400 Meters	Janelle Delaney	AUS	59.66
W65 400 Meters	Edel Maguire on YouTube	IRL	1:06.94
W70 3000 Meters	Nora Cary	USA	12:24.36
W75 3000 Meters	Sarah Roberts	GBR	12:28.82
W90 High Jump	Florence Meiler	USA	0.90
W60 Long Jump	Neringa Jakstiene	USA	4.77
W90 Triple Jump	Florence Meiler	USA	4.50
W90 Pole Vault	Florence Meiler	USA	1.37
W90 Pentathlon	Florence Meiler	USA	2531
W60 Hammer throw	Claudine Cacaut	FRA	47.19
W75 Weight Throw	Myrle Mensey	USA	16.82
W55 4 x 200 Meters Relay	Richelle Ingram(55), Julie Brims(59), Lenorë Lambert(55), Janelle Delaney(55)	AUS	1:52.64
W65 4 x 200 Meters Relay	Carol LaFayette-Boyd(82), Renata Macherzynska(66), Karla Del Grande(71), Wendy Alexis(70)	CAN	2:07.42

=== Men ===
Event	Athlete(s)	Nationality	Performance
M80 60 Meters	Kenton Brown	USA	8.76
M70 60 Meters Hurdles	Ward Hazen	CAN	9.37
M90 200 Meters	Radnaa Tseren	MGL	37.12
M55 400 Meters	Tim Munnings	BAH	52.82
M60 400 Meters	Roland Gröger on YouTube	GER	55.35
M85 1500 Meters	Jean-Louis Esnault	FRA	6:08.47
M90 1500 Meters	Radnaa Tseren	MGL	7:55.12
M50 3000 Meters	Francis Kipkoech Bowen on YouTube	KEN	8:36.23
M85 3000 Meters	Jean-Louis Esnault	FRA	13:39.24
M50 3000 Meters Race Walk	Erick Maugo Sikuku	KEN	12:34.20
M55 Triple Jump	Salem Alahmadi	KSA	13.66

=== Mixed ===
Event	Athlete(s)	Nationality	Performance
35 4 x 200 Meters Relay	Rasheta Butler(36), Trey Orchard(36), Edouard Ndecky(35), Ethan Mignard(36)	USA	1:36.71
40 4 x 200 Meters Relay	Easter Grant(41), Amanda O’Connor(40), Keith Major(40), Antoine Echols(42)	USA	1:35.25
45 4 x 200 Meters Relay	Sandra Halvatzis(45), Amanda Roberts(47), Michael Blunt(47), Jassiel Torres(47)	USA	1:38.58
50 4 x 200 Meters Relay	Christina Yarmul(51), Allison Murphy(53), Rawle DeLisle(50), Peter Haack(50) on YouTube	USA	1:44.64
55 4 x 200 Meters Relay	Emmanuelle McGowan(56), Andrea Collier(58), Greg Cook(55), Lee Bridges(58)	USA	1:48.14
60 4 x 200 Meters Relay	Sue McDonald(61), Shemayne Williams(62), Francois Boda(60), John Campbell(61)	USA	1:52.82
65 4 x 200 Meters Relay	Karen Maxwell(66), Elizabeth Deak(67), Willie Spruill(66), Brent Cottong(67)	USA	2:01.53
70 4 x 200 Meters Relay	Gail Johns-Rees(70), Claudia Simpson(71), Thomas Jones(71), Ron Stevens(71)	USA	2:06.61
75 4 x 200 Meters Relay	Joan McMullan(75), Mary Hartzler(75), Roger Parnell(75), N.Z. Bryant Jr(75)	USA	2:27.98
80 4 x 200 Meters Relay	Mary Robinson(83), Willy Moolenaar(84), William Keesling(84), Roger Pierce(80)	USA	3:04.07

== Medal table ==
2025 WMA World Indoor Championships Medal Table (Men) Top 10
Rank	Nation	Gold	Silver	Bronze	Total
1	United States (USA)	86	104	99	289
2	Great Britain (GBR)	16	8	9	33
3	Germany (GER)	15	15	9	39
4	France (FRA)	14	10	12	36
5	Spain (ESP)	11	15	17	43
6	Sweden (SWE)	11	6	2	19
7	Czech Republic (CZE)	8	2	0	10
8	Canada (CAN)	7	6	8	21
9	Finland (FIN)	6	1	4	11
10	Mongolia (MGL)	6	0	0	6
Totals (10 entries)		180	167	160	507
