= Masters W60 200 metres world record progression =

This is the progression of world record improvements of the 200 metres W60 division of Masters athletics.

Key

Incomplete information Wind aided Pending Better indoor mark

Hand	Auto	Wind	Athlete	Nationality	Birthday	Age	Location	Date
	27.78	-2.1	Nicole Alexis	France	9 January 1960	62 years, 175 days	Tampere	3 July 2022
	27.93	+1.3	Nicole Alexis	France	9 January 1960	62 years, 125 days	Maisons Alfort	14 May 2022
	28.11	+0.7	Karla Del Grande	Canada	27 March 1953	60 years, 209 days	Porto Alegre	22 October 2013
	28.54	+1.5	Phil Raschker	United States	21 February 1947	60 years, 165 days	Orono	5 August 2007
	28.62		Nadine O'Connor	United States	5 March 1942	63 years, 140 days	Carson	23 July 2005
	28.67		Irene Obera	United States	7 December 1933	61 years, 199 days	Eugene	24 June 1995
	29.67		Irene Obera	United States	7 December 1933	60		1994
	29.80		Ann Cooper	Australia	7 December 1928	62 years, 113 days	Canberra	30 March 1991
	29.93 i		Christel Franzen	Germany	11 November 1928	60 years, 99 days	Düsseldorf	18 February 1989
	30.15		Shirley Peterson	New Zealand	24 July 1928	61 years, 10 days	Eugene	3 August 1989
	30.26		Paula Schneiderhan	Germany	16 November 1921	61 years, 311 days	San Juan	23 September 1983
