= List of sportspeople–artists =

This is a list of people who are widely recognised in the fields of both sport and the visual arts:

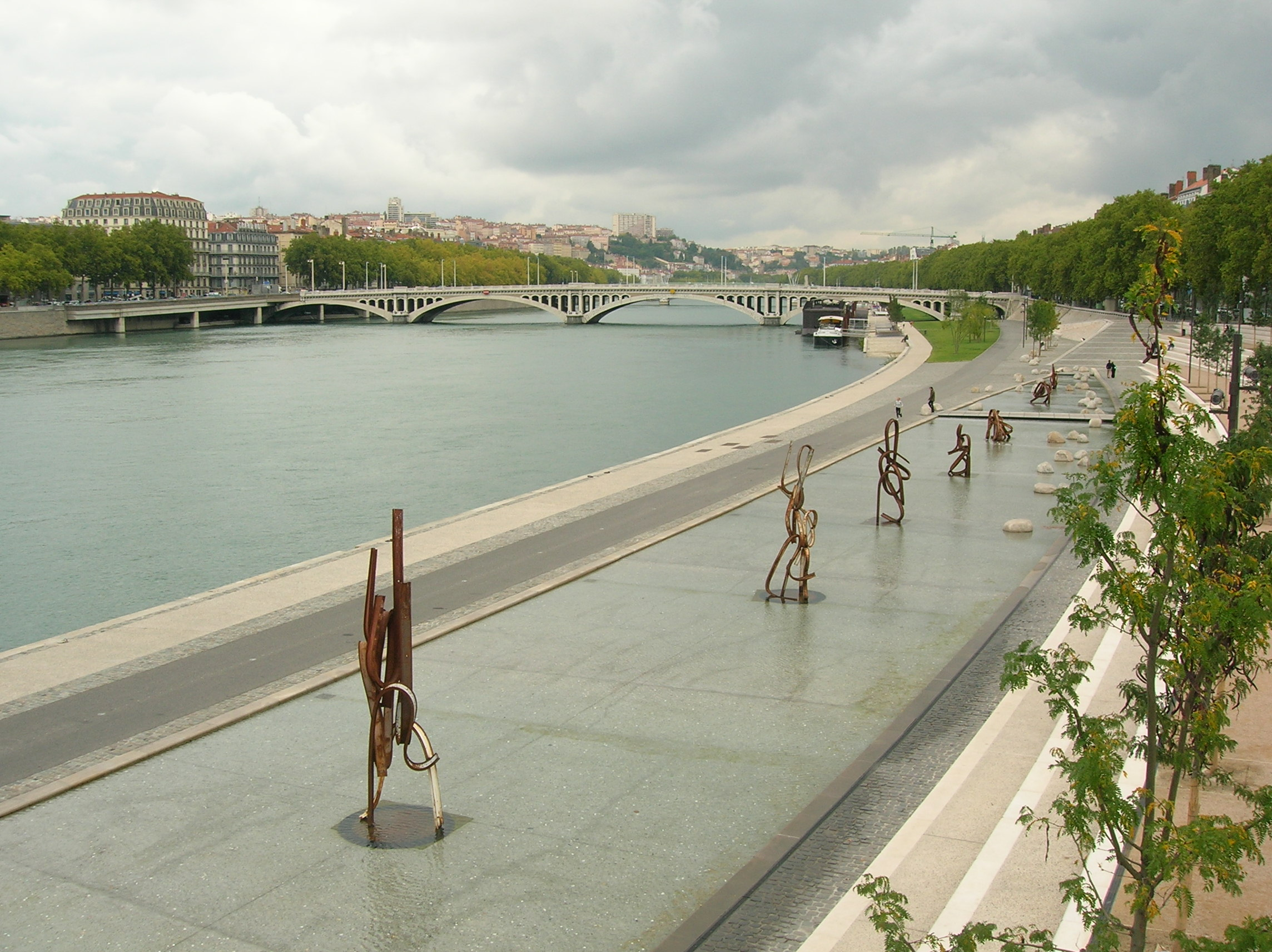
The sculpture installation Rives sur Berges, by former French rugby captain Jean-Pierre Rives.

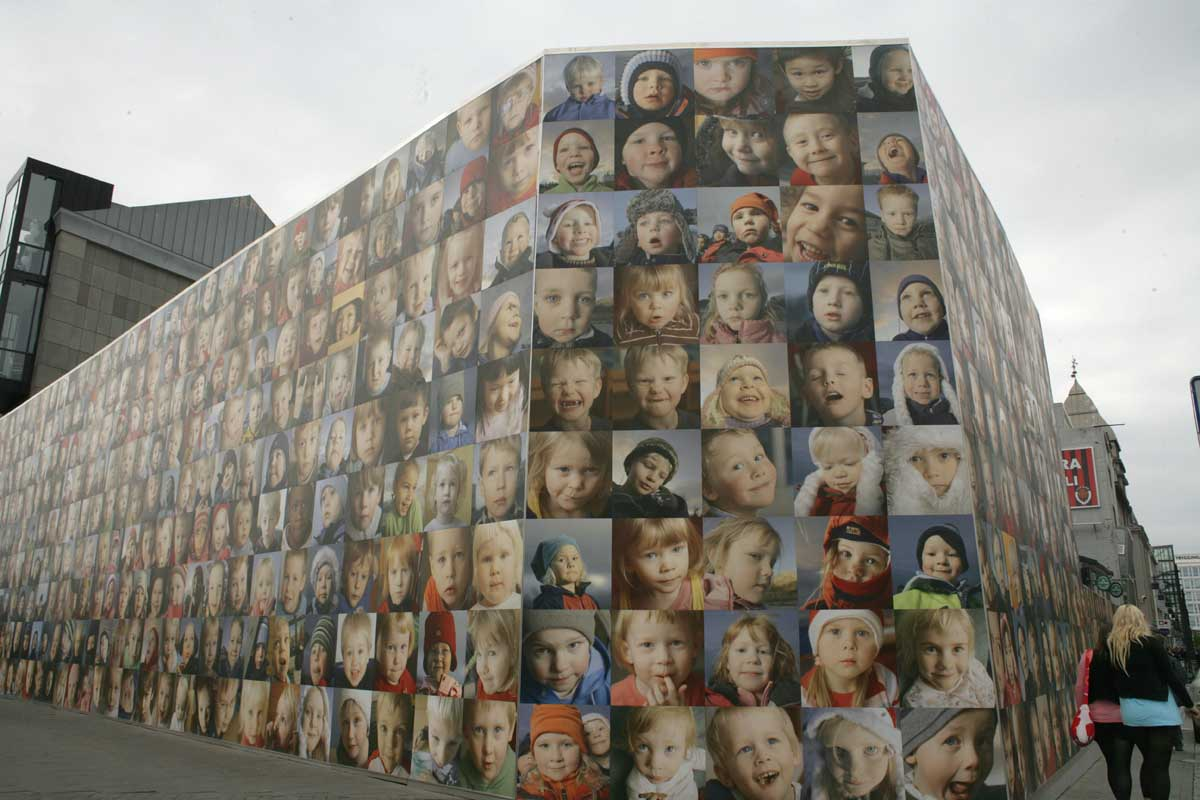
"Dialog", Iceland, Installation in 2008 by Fiann Paul (one of two authors of the project)

Name	Lifetime	Nationality	Sport	Art
Ernie Barnes	1938–2009	United States	American football offensive guard (San Diego Chargers, Denver Broncos)	Painting (The Sugar Shack)
Lanny Barnes	born 1982	United States	Biathlon (2006, 2010, 2014 Winter Olympics)	Drawing, illustration
Roald Bradstock	born 1962	England	Javelin (1984, 1988 Summer Olympics)	Painting (Struggle for Perfection) and performance art
Chris Coleman	born 1967	United States	Bobsled (1992, 1994 Winter Olympics)	Photography
Jody Craddock	born 1975	England	Association football defender (Sunderland, Wolverhampton Wanderers)	Painting
Lia Ditton	born 1980	England	Yachting and ocean rowing	Installation art
Jeremy Evans	born 1987	United States	Basketball forward (Utah Jazz)	Painting, drawing
Jean-Blaise Evéquoz	born 1953	Switzerland	Fencing (1976 Summer Olympics)	Painting
Shane Gould	born 1956	Australia	Swimming (1972 Summer Olympics)	Photography, film-making
Hubertus Von Hohenlohe	born 1959	Mexico	Skiing (1984, 1988, 1992, 1994, 2010, 2014 Winter Olympics)	Photography
David James	born 1970	England	Association football goalkeeper (Liverpool, Portsmouth, England)	Painting
Fyodor Konyukhov	born 1951	Russia	Yachting, ocean rowing, mountaineering	Painting
Todd Marinovich	born 1969	United States	American football quarterback (Los Angeles Raiders)	Painting and sculpture
Desmond Mason	born 1977	United States	Basketball shooting guard (Seattle SuperSonics, Milwaukee Bucks)	Painting, ceramics
Aaron Maybin	born 1988	United States	American football linebacker (Buffalo Bills, New York Jets)	Painting, photography
Blake McFarland	Born 1988	United States	Baseball pitcher (Toronto Blue Jays)	Sculpture
Nina McGowan	Born 1972	Ireland	Freediver. CMAS Freediving World Championships 2022. World Champion Gold Medallist FIM, World Record CNF, (Masters) 9x National Records (Seniors)	Sculpture / Installation / Drawing
Kees Meeuws	born 1974	New Zealand	Rugby union lock (Otago, New Zealand)	Drawing, illustration
Al Oerter	1936–2007	United States	Discus (1956, 1960, 1964, 1968 Summer Olympics)	Painting; founder of the Art of the Olympians organisation (AOTO)
Fiann Paul	born 1980	Iceland	Ocean rowing	Installation art (Dialog, See It!)
Jean-Pierre Rives	born 1952	France	Rugby union flanker (Stade Toulousain, France)	Sculpture, installation art (Rives sur Berges)
Jack Russell	born 1963	England	Cricket wicketkeeper (Gloucestershire, England)	Painting, drawing
Ken Taylor	born 1935	England	Football defender (Huddersfield Town), cricket opening batsman (Yorkshire, England)	Painting, drawing
Brett Tomko	born 1973	United States	Baseball pitcher (Cincinnati Reds, Los Angeles Dodgers)	Painting
Michael Vaughan	born 1974	England	Cricket opening batsman (Yorkshire, England)	Painting
Murray Webb	born 1947	New Zealand	Cricket fast bowler (Otago, New Zealand)	Cartoonist, illustrator
Walter W. Winans	1852–1920	United States	Shooting (1908, 1912 Summer Olympics)	Sculpture

== See also ==
- Art of the Olympians
