= Wendy Alexis =

Canadian sprinter (born 1955)

Wendy Alexis (born 25 March 1955) is a Canadian sprinter and former teacher. She currently resides in Ottawa.

== Career ==
She began competing all the way from elementary school to high school level. She started pursuing running at the age of eight. During her teenage days, she participated in athletics events by representing provincial and junior national teams. She also took part in Olympic trials in 1972. Wendy was unable to continue her career in athletics due to persistent injuries she had sustained during the start of her career. She suffered a career threatening injury at the age of 19. She was told to undergo a double-shin surgery that would forever prevent her from taking part in running events. She moved away from the athletics field at the age of 19 and her athletics career never really took off once she got married. After a long hiatus of roughly around 30 years, she made a comeback return to athletics especially in sprinting at the age of 50.

She claimed world title at the 2024 World Masters Athletics Championships in the women's W65 age category after clocking at 14.46 seconds. She participated at the 2025 World Masters Athletics Indoor Championships, where she broke the 200m world record for her age bracket among 70 year old athletes, twice in a day, initially clocking 30.68 seconds and she later bettered the timing with 30.33 seconds. In June 2025, she set new world record in her age bracket of 70 years in the women's 100m event after finishing the race with a record time of 14.63 seconds. However, her W70 100m world record was later surpassed by Chile's Sara Montecinos in November 2025. In September 2025, she broke the world record in her age group classification (70 years age category) for the women's 100m event. During the 2026 Canadian Masters Indoor Track & Field Championships which was held in Toronto, she set a new world indoor record.

In August 2026, Wendy set a new Canadian W70-74 100m record which helped her to claim the national title in the women's 200m in 31.11 seconds at the Canadian Masters Athletics Championships. In August 2026, she successfully defended her world championship title in the women's 100m event W70 age category at the World Masters Athletics Championships after clocking with a timing of 14.83 seconds.
