= Masters W60 100 metres world record progression =

This is the progression of world record improvements of the 100 metres W60 division of Masters athletics.

Key

Incomplete information Wind aided Pending

Hand	Auto	Wind	Athlete	Nationality	Birthdate	Age	Location	Date
	13.20	0.0	Nicole Alexis	France	9 January 1960	62 years, 172 days	Tampere	30 June 2022
	13.42	-0.2	Nicole Alexis	France	9 January 1960	62 years, 125 days	Maisons Alfort	14 May 2022
	13.46	1.2	Nicole Alexis	France	9 January 1960	62 years, 111 days	Villejuif	30 April 2022
	13.63	0.5	Karla Del Grande	Canada	27 March 1953	61 years, 113 days	Winston-Salem	18 July 2014 Video on YouTube
	13.75	0.0	Ingrid Meier	Germany	1 April 1947	61 years, 166 days	Aichach	14 September 2008
	13.67	2.8	Phil Raschker	United States	21 February 1947	60 years, 125 days	Louisville	26 June 2007
	13.92	0.0	Phil Raschker	United States	21 February 1947	60 years, 164 days	Orono	4 August 2007
	13.89	0.6	Brunhilde Hoffmann	Germany	17 August 1939	60 years, 4 days	Hagen	21 August 1999
	13.91		Irene Obera	United States	7 December 1933	60 years, 249 days	Eugene	13 August 1994
	14.17		Shirley Peterson	New Zealand	24 July 1928	60 years, 216 days	Christchurch	25 February 1989
15.5			Josephine Kolda	United States	24 March 1918	63 years, 193 days	Santa Barbara	3 October 1981
	16.01		Elizabeth Haule	West Germany			Christchurch	13 January 1981
