= Masters W55 200 metres world record progression =

This is the progression of world record improvements of the 200 metres W55 division of Masters athletics.

Key

Incomplete information Wind aided Pending better indoor records

Hand	Auto	Wind	Athlete	Nationality	Birthdate	Age	Location	Date	Ref
	24.63	1.7	Mandy Mason	Australia	16 December 1967	55 years, 344 days	Perth	25 November 2023	
	24.94	1.9	Mandy Mason	Australia	16 December 1967	55 years, 329 days	Perth	10 November 2023	
	25.07	1.5	Julie Brims	Australia	7 January 1966	55 years, 59 days	Brisbane	7 March 2021	
	25.18	0.0	Julie Brims	Australia	7 January 1966	55 years, 23 days	Brisbane	30 January 2021	
	26.36	1.2	Nicole Alexis	France	9 January 1960	55 years, 170 days	Nogent-sur-Marne	28 June 2015	
	26.13i		Nicole Alexis	France	9 January 1960	55 years, 77 days	Toruń	27 March 2015	
	27.16	-0.3	Marie Mathieu	France	26 November 1956	56 years, 330 days	Porto Alegre	22 October 2013	
	27.26	0.6	Ingrid Meier	Germany	1 April 1947	56 years, 172 days	Röthenbach	20 September 2003	
	27.39	2.1	Phil Raschker	United States	21 February 1947	55 years, 171 days	Orono	11 August 2002	
	27.90	1.2	Avril Douglas	Canada	1 August 1946	55 years, 25 days	Toronto	26 August 2001	
	28.13	0.3	Brunhilde Hoffmann	Germany	17 August 1939	56 years, 344 days	Malmö	26 July 1996	
	28.40		Brunhilde Hoffmann	Germany	17 August 1939			1995	
	28.48	0.0	Irene Obera	United States	7 December 1933	55 years, 239 days	Eugene	3 August 1989	
28.5			Shirley Peterson	New Zealand	24 July 1928	56 years, 229 days	Christchurch	10 March 1985	
	29.59		Lieselotte Seuberlich	Germany	19 July 1926	57 years, 66 days	San Juan	23 September 1983	
