= Masters W50 100 metres world record progression =

This is the progression of world record improvements of the 100 metres W50 division of Masters athletics.

Key

Incomplete information Wind aided Pending

Hand	Auto	Wind	Athlete	Nationality	Birthdate	Location	Date
	11.67	0.9	Merlene Ottey	Slovenia	10.05.1960	Novo Mesto	13.07.2010
	12.50	1.6	Phil Raschker	United States	21.02.1947	Knoxville	17.05.1997
	13.06	2.1	Marge Allison	Australia	13.09.1944	Buffalo	13.07.1995
	13.13		Irene Obera	United States	07.12.1933	Eugene	17.08.1984
	13.16		Irene Obera	United States	07.12.1933	Los Angeles	14.07.1984
	13.17		Daphne Pirie	Australia	12.12.1931	Houston	16.09.1983
	13.50		Shirley Peterson	New Zealand	24.07.1928	Christchurch	10.03.1982
