= Masters W55 100 metres world record progression =

This is the progression of world record improvements of the 100 metres W55 division of Masters athletics.

Key

Incomplete information Wind aided Pending

Hand	Auto	Wind	Athlete	Nationality	Birthdate	Age	Location	Date	Ref
	12.15	1.9	Mandy Mason	Australia	16 December 1967	55 years, 350 days	Perth	1 December 2023	
	12.24	1.5	Julie Brims	Australia	7 January 1966	55 years, 37 days	Canberra	13 February 2021	
	12.34	-0.7	Julie Brims	Australia	7 January 1966	55 years, 23 days	Brisbane	30 January 2021	
	12.80	1.4	Nicole Alexis	France	9 January 1960	55 years, 162 days	Ivry-sur-Seine	20 June 2015	
	13.30	-1.3	Phil Raschker	United States	21 February 1947	55 years, 170 days	Orono	10 August 2002	
	13.43	0.2	Brunhilde Hoffmann	Germany	17 August 1939	56 years, 27 days	Wetzlar	13 September 1995	
	13.65	1.3	Una Adella Gore	Great Britain	18 June 1938	55 years, 119 days	Miyazaki	15 October 1993	
	13.84		Irene Obera	United States	7 December 1933	55 years, 225 days	San Diego	20 July 1989	
13.6			Shirley Peterson	New Zealand	24 July 1928	55 years, 181 days	Christchurch	21 January 1984	
	13.90		Christel Franzen	Germany	11 November 1928	57 years, 321 days	Malmö	28 September 1986	
