= Masters W65 100 metres world record progression =

This is the progression of world record improvements of the 100 metres W65 division of Masters athletics.

Key

Incomplete information Wind aided Pending

Hand	Auto	Wind	Athlete	Nationality	Birthdate	Age	Location	Date	Ref
	13.79	(+1.8 m/s)	Nicole Alexis	France	9 January 1960	65 years, 142 days	Les Sables d'Olonne	31 May 2025	
	13.91	+0.6	Karla Del Grande	Canada	27.03.1953		Toronto	11.08.2018	
	13.96	+0.7	Karla Del Grande	Canada	27.03.1953		Surrey	04.08.2018	
	14.00	+0.4	Karla Del Grande	Canada	27.03.1953		Toronto	28.07.2018	
	14.04	-1.5	Karla Del Grande	Canada	27.03.1953		Málaga	06.09.2018	
	14.10	1.5	Nadine O'Connor	United States	05.03.1942		San Marcos	30.06.2007	
	14.11		Nadine O'Connor	United States	05.03.1942		Walnut	14.04.2007	
	14.24		Irene Obera	United States	07.12.1933		Los Gatos	12.06.1999	
	14.62		Shirley Peterson	New Zealand	24.07.1928		Auckland	26.02.1994	
	14.82	0.5	Paula Schneiderham	Germany	16.11.1921	Freudenstadt	17.06.1988		
14.7			Daphne Pirie	Australia	12.12.1931		Sydney	15.12.1987	
