= Masters W70 pole vault world record progression =

This is the progression of world record improvements of the pole vault W70 division of Masters athletics.

Key

Incomplete information Pending

Height	Athlete	Nationality	Birthdate	Age	Location	Date	Ref
2.95 m	Nadine O'Connor	United States	5 March 1942	70 years, 130 days	San Diego	13 July 2012	
2.88 m	Nadine O'Connor	United States	5 March 1942	70 years, 96 days	Chula Vista	9 June 2012	
2.80 m	Nadine O'Connor	United States	5 March 1942	70 years, 33 days	San Marcos	7 April 2012	
2.77 m	Nadine O'Connor	United States	5 March 1942	70 years, 12 days	San Diego	17 March 2012	
2.36 m	Becky Lynn Sisley	United States	10 May 1939	70 years, 48 days	Gresham	27 June 2009	
2.32 m	Midori Yamamoto	Japan	13 September 1934	70 years, 81 days	Bangkok	3 December 2004	
2.16 m	Leonore McDaniels	United States	6 March 1928	70 years, 157 days	Eugene	10 August 1998	
