= Masters W65 200 metres world record progression =

This is the progression of world record improvements of the 200 metres W65 division of Masters athletics.

Key

Incomplete information Wind aided Pending

Hand	Auto	Wind	Athlete	Nationality	Birthdate	Location	Date
	28.53	+1.2	Karla Del Grande	Canada	27.03.1953	Surrey	05.08.2018
	28.99	-0.4	Karla Del Grande	Canada	27.03.1953	Toronto	24.07.2018
	29.37	-1.8	Nadine O'Connor	United States	05.03.1942	Los Angeles	08.07.2007
	29.38	1.1	Nadine O'Connor	United States	05.03.1942	Eagle Rock	22.07.2007
	29.84	3.4	Nadine O'Connor	United States	05.03.1942	San Marcos	30.06.2007
	29.87		Nadine O'Connor	United States	05.03.1942	Long Beach	19.05.2007
	30.26	2.3	Diane Palmason	Canada	15.03.1938	Richmond	17.08.2003
	30.46	0.1	Irene Obera	United States	07.12.1933	Gateshead	03.08.1999
	31.12	-0.2	Paula Schneiderhan	Germany	16.11.1921	Freudenstadt	18.06.1988
	32.23		Aileen Hogan	Australia	23.10.1922	Melbourne	29.11.1987
