= Masters W65 pole vault world record progression =

This is the progression of world record improvements of the pole vault W65 division of Masters athletics.

Key

Incomplete information Pending

Height	Athlete	Nationality	Birthdate	Age	Location	Date	Ref
3.19 m	Nadine O'Connor	United States	5 March 1942	67 years, 134 days	San Diego	17 July 2009	
3.17 m	Nadine O'Connor	United States	5 March 1942	66 years, 92 days	San Diego	5 June 2008	
3.15 m	Nadine O'Connor	United States	5 March 1942	67 years, 85 days	San Diego	29 May 2009	
3.13 m	Nadine O'Connor	United States	5 March 1942	67 years, 79 days	Costa Mesa	23 May 2009	
3.10 m	Nadine O'Connor	United States	5 March 1942	66 years, 145 days	San Diego	28 July 2008	
3.07 m	Nadine O'Connor	United States	5 March 1942	66 years, 142 days	San Diego	25 July 2008	
3.06 m	Nadine O'Connor	United States	5 March 1942	66 years, 135 days	San Diego	18 July 2008	
3.05 m	Nadine O'Connor	United States	5 March 1942	65 years, 11 days	San Diego	16 March 2007	
2.40 m	Joy MacDonald	United States	25 January 1941	65 years, 190 days	Charlotte	3 August 2006	
2.32 m	Midori Yamamoto	Japan	13 September 1934	68 years, 254 days	Osaka	25 May 2003	
2.10 m	Leonore McDaniels	United States	6 March 1928	69 years, 155 days	San Jose	8 August 1997	
