= Masters W40 100 metres world record progression =

This is the progression of world record improvements of the 100 metres W40 division of Masters athletics.

Key

Incomplete information Wind aided Pending

Hand	Auto	Wind	Athlete	Nationality	Birthdate	Location	Date
	10.99	-1.2	Merlene Ottey	Jamaica	10.05.1960	Thessaloniki	30.08.2000
	11.00	+1.3	Merlene Ottey	Jamaica	10.05.1960	Ljubljana	14.08.2000
	11.06	-1.2	Merlene Ottey	Jamaica	10.05.1960	Zürich	11.08.2000
	11.85	1.1	Zdeňka Mušinská	Czech Republic	14.04.1957	Prague	24.05.1997
	12.03		Phil Raschker	United States	21.02.1947	Eugene	14.08.1987
12.0			Maeve Kyle	Ireland	06.10.1928	Belfast	25.04.1970
