= Masters W60 pole vault world record progression =

This is the progression of world record improvements of the pole vault W60 division of Masters athletics.

Key

Incomplete information Pending

Height	Athlete	Nationality	Birthdate	Age	Location	Date	Ref
3.12 m	Nadine O'Connor	United States	5 March 1942	64 years, 139 days	Long Beach	22 July 2006	
3.11 m	Nadine O'Connor	United States	5 March 1942	64 years, 84 days	San Diego	28 May 2006	
3.10 m	Nadine O'Connor	United States	5 March 1942	63 years, 103 days	San Diego	16 June 2005	
3.05 m	Nadine O'Connor	United States	5 March 1942	62 years, 254 days	San Diego	14 November 2004	
2.92 m	Nadine O'Connor	United States	5 March 1942	62 years, 13 days	San Diego	18 March 2004	
2.85 m	Nadine O'Connor	United States	5 March 1942	61 years, 155 days	Eugene	7 August 2003	
2.84 m	Nadine O'Connor	United States	5 March 1942	61 years, 155 days	Eugene	7 August 2003	
2.83 m	Nadine O'Connor	United States	5 March 1942	61 years, 155 days	Eugene	7 August 2003	
2.80 m	Nadine O'Connor	United States	5 March 1942	61 years, 143 days	San Diego	26 July 2003	
2.72 m	Nadine O'Connor	United States	5 March 1942	61 years, 115 days	Poway	28 June 2003	
2.63 m	Nadine O'Connor	United States	5 March 1942	60 years, 18 days	San Diego	23 March 2002	
2.53 m	Barbara Cleveland	United States	1940		Kissimmee	2 December 2000	
2.36 m	Kimiko Nakamura	Japan	7 December 1937	60 years, 259 days	Kofu	23 August 1998	
