= Masters M55 javelin throw world record progression =

Masters M55 javelin throw world record progression is the progression of world record improvements of the javelin throw M55 division of Masters athletics. Records must be set in properly conducted, official competitions under the standing IAAF rules unless modified by World Masters Athletics. The M55 division consists of male athletes who have reached the age of 55 but have not yet reached the age of 60, so exactly from their 55th birthday to the day before their 60th birthday. The M55 division throws a 700 g implement.

Key

Incomplete information Pending

Distance	Athlete	Nationality	Birthdate	Age	Location	Date	Ref
66.76 m (Old design)	Roald Bradstock	Great Britain	24 June 1962	54 years, 323 days	Clermont	13 May 2017	
66.11 m	Michael Brown	United States	28 November 1953	56 years, 196 days	Raleigh	12 June 2010	
65.74 m	Larry Stuart	United States	19 October 1937	57 years, 171 days	Long Beach	8 April 1995	
