= Masters W50 200 metres world record progression =

This is the progression of world record improvements of the 200 metres W50 division of Masters athletics.

Key

Incomplete information Wind aided Pending

Hand	Auto	Wind	Athlete	Nationality	Birthdate	Location	Date
	24.33	0.9	Merlene Ottey	Slovenia	10.05.1960	Velenje	18.07.2010
	25.65	0.0	Marie Lande Mathieu	Puerto Rico	26.11.1956	Riccione	04.09.2007
	25.72	-0.1	Phil Raschker	United States	21.02.1947	Durban	23.07.1997
	26.56	0.9	Marge Allison	Australia	13.09.1944	Buffalo	19.07.1995
	26.84		Jan Hynes	Australia	03.04.1944	Brisbane	1994
	27.25		Irene Obera	United States	07.12.1933	Eugene	19.08.1984
	27.40		Irene Obera	United States	07.12.1933	Los Angeles	14.07.1984
	27.65		Daphne Pirie	Australia	12.12.1931	San Juan	16.09.1983
	28.04		Maeve Kyle	Ireland	06.10.1928	Hannover	29.07.1979
