= Masters W45 long jump world record progression =

This is the progression of world record improvements of the long jump W45 division of Masters athletics.

Key

Incomplete information Pending better indoor record

Distance	Wind	Athlete	Nationality	Birthdate	Age	Location	Date
5.71	0.0	Melissa Foster	Australia	8 September 1978	45 years, 170 days	Perth	25 February 2024
5.70	-0.2	Magdalena Hristova	Bulgaria	25 February 1977	45 years, 211 days	Thessaloniki	24 September 2022
5.82	0.2	Tatyana Ter-Mesrobyan	Russia	12 May 1968	45 years, 71 days	Moscow	22 July 2013
5.62	0.7	Kriemhild Mann	Germany	12 September 1966	45 years, 229 days	Osterode	28 April 2012
5.59	1.9	Karin von Riewel	Germany	9 December 1948	48 years, 271 days	Willich	6 September 1997
5.75 i		Phil Raschker	United States	21 February 1947	47 years, 12 days	Chicago	5 March 1994
5.53		Christiane Schmalbruch	Germany	8 January 1937	45 years, 267 days	Rostock	2 October 1982
5.18		Corrie Roovers	Netherlands	14 July 1935	47 years, 3 days	Strasbourg	17 July 1982
5.13		Maeve Kyle	Ireland	6 October 1928	45 years, 308 days	Belfast	10 August 1974
