= Masters W55 400 metres world record progression =

This is the progression of world record improvements of the 400 metres W55 division of Masters athletics.

Key

Incomplete information Pending

Hand	Auto	Athlete	Nationality	Birthdate	Location	Date
	59.36	Julie Brims	Australia	7 January 1966	Brisbane	23 January 2021
	1:00.56	Marie Mathieu	Puerto Rico	26 November 1956	Porto Alegre	26 October 2013
	1:01.56	Caroline Ann Powell	United Kingdom	21 December 1953	Yeovil	9 September 2012
	1:02.34	Joylyn Saunders Mullins	United Kingdom	27 November 1952	Lahti	28 July 2009
	1:02.40	Avril Douglas	Canada	1 August 1946	Toronto	25 August 2001
	1:04.2	Anne Stobaus	Australia	6 July 1941	Aberfeldie	16 November 1996
	1:04.50	Brunhilde Hoffmann	Germany	17 August 1939	Buffalo	22 July 1995
	1:05.29	Kemisole Solwazi	United States	20 October 1939		8 April 1995
	1:05.48	Carolyn Sue Cappetta	United States	1936	Turku	18 July 1991
	1:08.26	Josefina Garcia de Schultz	Venezuela	14 December 1933		1990
	1:08.41	Irene Obera	United States	7 December 1933	San Diego	20 July 1989
