= Masters M90 shot put world record progression =

Men's world shot put records

Masters M90 shot put world record progression is the progression of world record improvements of the shot put M90 division of Masters athletics. Records must be set in properly conducted, official competitions under the standing IAAF rules unless modified by World Masters Athletics. The M90 division consists of male athletes who have reached the age of 90 but have not yet reached the age of 95, so exactly from their 90th birthday to the day before their 95th birthday. Based on the World Masters Athletics rule modification, the M90 division throws a 3 kg implement.

Key

Incomplete information Better indoor record Pending

Distance	Athlete	Nationality	Birthdate	Age	Location	Date	Ref
10.49 m	Östen Edlund	Sweden	26 November 1934	90 years, 199 days	Tingstäde	13 June 2025	
10.46 m	Östen Edlund	Sweden	26 November 1934	90 years, 173 days	Tumba	18 May 2025	
10.48 m i	Östen Edlund	Sweden	26 November 1934	90 years, 95 days	Sollentuna	1 March 2025	
10.34 m i	Östen Edlund	Sweden	26 November 1934	90 years, 60 days	Sätra	25 January 2025	
9.89 m	Leo Saarinen	Finland	27 June 1929	90 years, 73 days	Jesolo	8 September 2019	
10.18 m	Donald Pellmann	United States	12 August 1915	93 years, 360 days	Palo Alto	7 August 2009	
10.41 m	Donald Pellmann	United States	12 August 1915	93 years, 32 days	Milwaukee	13 September 2008	
9.88 m	Joseph Myers	United States	24 March 1919	90 years, 120 days	York	22 July 2009	
9.73 m	Toini Ahvenjärvi	Finland			Lappeenranta	2 July 2011	
9.54 m	Frederico Fischer	Brazil	6 January 1917	90 years, 243 days	Riccione	6 September 2007	
8.50 m	Ilmari Saunamäki	Finland	20 January 1917	90 years, 29 days	Kuortane	18 February 2007	
