= Masters M50 javelin throw world record progression =

Masters M50 javelin throw world record progression is the progression of world record improvements of the javelin throw M50 division of Masters athletics. Records must be set in properly conducted, official competitions under the standing IAAF rules unless modified by World Masters Athletics. The M50 division consists of male athletes who have reached the age of 50 but have not yet reached the age of 55, so exactly from their 50th birthday to the day before their 55th birthday. The M50 division throws a 700 g implement.

Key

Incomplete information Pending

Distance	Athlete	Nationality	Birthdate	Age	Location	Date	Ref
76.15 m (Old design)	Roald Bradstock	Great Britain	24 April 1962	50 years, 39 days	Clermont	2 June 2012	
71.01 m	Luis Nogueira Fernandez	Spain	15 January 1956	51 years, 232 days	Riccione	4 September 2007	
70.71 m	Michael Brown	United States	28 November 1953	51 years, 132 days	Clermont	9 April 2005	
67.34 m	Joe Greenberg	United States	9 May 1950	51 years, 3 days	Long Beach	12 May 2001	
65.88 m	Esa Kiuru	Finland	14 April 1947	53 years, 107 days	Orimattila	30 July 2000	
65.76 m	Larry Stuart	United States	19 October 1937	50 years, 194 days		30 April 1988	
