= William Kund =

American cyclist (1946–2025)

Personal information
- Nickname: Bill Kund
- Born: 30 March 1946 Wels, Austria
- Died: 30 April 2025 (aged 79) Venice, Florida
- Height: 186 cm (6 ft 1 in)
- Weight: 80 kg (176 lb)

Cycling career
- Sport: Cycling

William Kund (30 March 1946 – 30 April 2025) was an American cyclist, who competed in the 1000m time trial at the 1964 Summer Olympics. He was also a photographer with works on display with the Art of the Olympians. Kund died on 30 April 2025, at the age of 79.
