= Kozo Haraguchi =

Japanese sprinter (1910–2011)

Kozo Haraguchi (原口 幸三, Haraguchi Kōzō; June 20, 1910 in Kobayashi, Miyazaki – January 11, 2011 in Miyazaki City, Kyushu) was a track and field athlete and former World Masters Athletics record holder in the 100 m sprint for men aged 90–94 (18.08 seconds, 2000) as well as the former record holder for men aged 95–100 (21.69 seconds, August 27, 2005). Haraguchi began competing in track and field events when he turned 65, with his exercise regimen which included a one-hour walk every morning.
