= Masters W60 80 metres hurdles world record progression =

This is the progression of world record improvements of the 80 metres hurdles W60 division of Masters athletics.

Key

Incomplete information Wind aided Pending

Hand	Auto	Wind	Athlete	Nationality	Birthdate	Location	Date
	13.26	1.5	Phil Raschker	United States	21.02.1947	Riccione	04.09.2007
	13.77	1.6	Marianne Maier	Austria	25.12.1942	Aarhus	30.07.2004
	13.89	1.5	Corrie Roovers	Netherlands	14.07.1935	Barendrecht	15.06.1996
	14.03		Wanda Dos Santos	Brazil	01.06.1932	São Paulo	1995
	14.36	1.7	Asta Larsson	Sweden	23.10.1931	Lund	18.08.1992
