= Simon Goody =

British windsurfer (born 1966)

Simon Goody (born 19 November 1966) is a Great Britain Olympic windsurfer from the 1988 Seoul Olympics.

He was also Youth National Champion, National Champion, National Series Champion twice, Bronze Medalist in the World Slalom Championships, top 10 European Championships and GBR No1 for many years, including qualifying for the Pre Olympics 1987 and the 1988 Olympics as the only GBR male competitor in both Games representing GBR Simon Goody is also a Guinness World Record Holder, participating in the longest marathon playing Field Hockey lasting 56 hours 18 minutes and 45 seconds with Chelmsford Hockey Club from 1 July till 4 July 2016. In September 2017 he participated in another World Record attempt and broke a new World Record in Hockey by 47 players for the highest number of players in one continuous exhibition match. Simon Goody was also a Senior Independent Financial adviser for over 23 years and also a stock broker for a number of years. He is also an artist with works on display with the Art of the Olympians.
