= Masters W65 80 metres hurdles world record progression =

This is the progression of world record improvements of the 80 metres hurdles W65 division of Masters athletics.

Key

Incomplete information Wind aided Pending

Hand	Auto	Wind	Athlete	Nationality	Birthdate	Age	Location	Date
	13.22	+1.8	Jane Horder	United Kingdom	18 January 1957	65 years, 145 days	Derby	12 June 2022
	13.48	+0.2	Jane Horder	United Kingdom	18 January 1957	65 years, 116 days	Yeovil	14 May 2022
	13.57	-0.2	Jane Horder	United Kingdom	18 January 1957	65 years, 104 days	Cheltenham	2 May 2022
	14.03	+0.6	Edith Graff	Belgium	9 November 1941	66 years, 275 days	Ljubljana	10 August 2008
	13.89	+2.2	Nadine O'Connor	United States	5 March 1942	65 years, 215 days	Santa Barbara	6 October 2007
	14.31	-1.2	Nadine O'Connor	United States	5 March 1942	65 years, 193 days	Riccione	14 September 2007
	14.27	+0.7	Rietje Dijkman	Netherlands	21 June 1939	65 years, 39 days	Arhus	30 July 2004
	14.91	+1.1	Leili Kaas	Estonia	1 October 1934	65 years, 330 days	Huddinge	26 August 2000
