= Shirley Hardman =

New Zealand sprinter (1928–2019)

Shirley Peterson
Personal information
- Born: Shirley Ngarita Hardman; 24 July 1928
- Died: 19 July 2019 (aged 90)
- Spouse: William Eric Harold Peterson (m. 1952; died 2011)

Sport
- Country: New Zealand
- Sport: Track and field

Achievements and titles
- National finals: 75 yd champion (1949, 1950, 1951, 1952, 1953); 100 yd champion (1948, 1949, 1951, 1952, 1953); Long jump champion (1946)
Medal record
Women's athletics
Representing New Zealand
Commonwealth Games
Silver medal – second place	1950 Auckland	440 yards relay

Shirley Ngarita Peterson (née Hardman; 24 July 1928 – 19 July 2019) was a New Zealand track and field athlete. She represented her country at the 1950 British Empire Games, winning a silver medal in the women's 440 yards relay. From 1980, she became active in masters athletics, setting world records in various events and age-group categories, and winning multiple world masters athletics championship titles.

== Early life and family ==
Peterson was born Shirley Ngarita Hardman on 24 July 1928, to Gladys Dulcie Hardman (née Watt) and Edwin Arthur Hardman, and she spent her early years in Invercargill. Her father died in 1934, and after her mother died in 1943 she was placed in an orphanage. Educated at King Edward Technical College in Dunedin, she married William Eric Harold Peterson in 1952. Their children include Bev Peterson, who represented New Zealand in athletics at the 1990 Commonwealth Games, and Evan Peterson, who won national athletics titles in the long jump, triple jump and 400 m hurdles.

== Athletics ==
Hardman began running as a student at Invercargill Primary School, and later won all of the sprint titles at King Edward Technical College. In 1944 she was successful at the South Island schools athletics championships.

In 1946, Hardman won her first national track and field title, the long jump, with a best leap of 17 ft 0 in (5.18 m). It was, however, as a sprinter that she enjoyed the greatest success, winning the New Zealand 75 yards title every year from 1949 to 1953, and the 100 yards in 1948, 1949, 1951, 1952, and 1953.

In a 100 yards race at the Caledonian Ground in Dunedin in 1947, Hardman unofficially recorded 10.8 seconds, to equal the world record for the distance at that time. However, as there was only one timekeeper, the time was not ratified.

At the 1950 British Empire Games, Hardman competed in the 100 yards sprint, the 440 yards relay, and the 660 yards relay. In the 100 yards, she finished fifth in the final, posting a time of 11.3 seconds. She was a member of the New Zealand trio, with Lesley Rowe and Dorothea Parker, that won the silver medal in the 440 yards relay with a time of 48.7 seconds. In the 660 yards relay, the New Zealand women were leading going into the final baton change to Hardman. However, the baton was dropped and Hardman incorrectly retrieved it. She crossed the finish line in second place, but the New Zealand quartet was disqualified.

After marrying, Peterson competed in one final national athletics championship in 1953 before retiring to raise a family.

Returning to athletics when she was 52 years old, Peterson went on to compete in a range of track and field events, breaking numerous world masters athletics records. These include:

Age division	Event	Time or distance	Location	Date
W50	100 m	13.50 s	Christchurch	10 March 1982
W55	100 m	13.6 s	Christchurch	21 January 1984
W60	100 m	14.17 s	Christchurch	25 February 1989
W65	100 m	14.62 s	Auckland	26 February 1994
W55	200 m	28.5 s	Christchurch	10 March 1985
W60	200 m	30.15 s	Eugene	3 August 1989
W70	80 m hurdles	17.46 s	Christchurch	28 November 1998
W65	Triple jump	9.03 m	Miyazaki	13 October 1993
W70	Triple jump	7.87 m	Christchurch	20 February 1999

In 1989, Peterson won four gold medals at the World Masters Athletics Championships in Eugene, Oregon. At the 2001 event in Brisbane, she won gold and bronze medals in the 80 metres hurdles and triple jump, respectively.

At the 2002 World Masters Games in Melbourne, Peterson won the W70 triple jump gold medal with a distance of 7.32 metres.

Peterson died on 19 July 2019.
