= Masters W70 80 metres hurdles world record progression =

This is the progression of world record improvements of the 80 metres hurdles W70 division of Masters athletics.

Key

Incomplete information Wind aided Pending

Hand	Auto	Wind	Athlete	Nationality	Birthdate	Location	Date
	16.04	-0.9	Marianne Maier	Austria	25.12.42	Porto Alegre	16.10.13
	16.10	0.7	Asta Larsson	Sweden	23.10.1931	Arhus	30.07.2004
	16.24	>2.0	Rosaline Sole	New Zealand	21.08.1915	Melbourne	29.11.1987
	17.46		Shirley Peterson	New Zealand	24.07.1928		28.11.1998
	18.25	0.4	Hideko Koshikawa	Japan	02.01.1933	Carolina	11.07.2003
	18.48	1.2	Shirley Peterson	New Zealand	24.07.1928	Brisbane	12.07.2001
