= Larry Stuart (javelin thrower) =

Larry Stuart (born October 19, 1937 – June 6, 2015) was an American track and field athlete, known primarily for the javelin throw.

== Biography ==
He has held numerous records in the event, including four times setting and improving the National Junior College Record while at Santa Ana College and after a stint throwing in the Marines, the school record at the University of Southern California, at 267 ft 3 in (81.45 m) on March 30, 1963 which held until 1986 when the design of the javelin was changed for competition worldwide.

Stuart competed twice in the United States Olympic Trials, finishing 8th in 1960 while competing for Santa Ana College and 11th in 1964 with poor throwing while competing for the Southern California Striders. Had he thrown anywhere close to his mark from USC a year earlier, he would have beaten the field by up to 25 feet. He was ranked #2 in the US in 1963 and 1965. but was hampered by injuries in 1964, dropping to #7. In all he was ranked in the US. top 10 nine times between 1963 and 1973, only missing the 1968 and 1972 Olympic years.

Stuart did not quit throwing, instead he found his way into the new division of masters athletics setting the M45 world record at age 48 as soon as the new javelin came out. Stuart improved the previous record by over 6 meters (20 feet). His mark remained until 2007, when it was surpassed by British/American Olympian Roald Bradstock. He remained consistent setting almost identical records in the M50 and M55 divisions 7 years apart. At the 1995 WAVA World Championships he faced 1968 Olympic Gold Medalist Janis Lusis and defeated him soundly. His winning throw that day 57.36 m (188 ft 2 1/4 in).

Then came a series of frustrating events where paperwork technicalities prevented his marks from being recognized. He still has the farthest throw recorded in the M60 division, but that mark is forever pending, never to be recognized. Again in the M65 division he made multiple record throws that would have lasted for 9 years, but were not recognized. In frustration, Stuart quit competing but still threw for fun and held classes as "Larry Stuart's School of Javelin" at Marina High School. Sportsmen on Film sells a DVD Larry Stuart on Javelin Throwing.

Stuart was elected into the USATF Masters Hall of Fame in 1999. He was elected into the Santa Ana College Hall of Fame in 2003. He was elected into the USC Trojans Track and Field Hall of fame and given the Heritage Award in 1996.
