= Masters M65 javelin throw world record progression =

Masters M65 javelin throw world record progression is the progression of world record improvements of the javelin throw M65 division of Masters athletics. Records must be set in properly conducted, official competitions under the standing IAAF rules unless modified by World Masters Athletics. The M65 division consists of male athletes who have reached the age of 65 but have not yet reached the age of 70, so exactly from their 65th birthday to the day before their 70th birthday. The M65 division throws a 600 g implement, the same specifications as the open women's javelin.

Key

Incomplete information Pending

Distance	Athlete	Nationality	Birthdate	Location	Date
58.58	Esa Kiuru	Finland	14 April 1947	Helsinki	27 May 2012
57.83	Larry Stuart	United States	19 October 1937	Eagle Rock	10 April 2003
54.70	Wladyslaw Kowalczyk	Germany	9 March 1937	Potsdam	22 August 2002
50.15	Akit Itkonen	Finland	5 March 1933	Saimaanharju	21 August 1999
45.53	Olavi Rantanen	Finland	1934	Gateshead	4 August 1999
