= Florence Meiler =

American track and field athlete

Personal information
- Nationality: American

Sport
- Country: USA
- Sport: Athletics

Florence Meiler, also known as Flo Meiler (born 7 June 1934), is an American masters track and field athlete who has taken part in a plethora of sporting disciplines in her career, including pole vaulting, high jumping, hurdling, hammer throwing, long jumping, javelin throwing, steeplechasing, sprinting, and distance running. As of 2024, she has set at least 35 world records in masters athletics and is regarded as one of the most decorated track and field athletes of all time in athletics history to have never competed at the Olympics. She also established US national and world records for pole vault in the 75-79 and 80-84 age categories.

== Biography ==
She grew up on a dairy farm in Champlain, New York. She also competed in basketball, cheerleading, tap dancing, drama club, and glee club at her high school. She is the aunt of John Francescone.

== Career ==
She passionately took up an interest in athletics at the age of 60 which is quite a rare phenomenon considering the biological aspects including the body fitness, age and other factors. It all started when one of her friends Barbara Jordan convinced and encouraged Meiler to think about taking up a sporting discipline. Barbara also motivated Meiler to join the masters track team and compete in the Vermont State Senior Games. Her participation at the Vermont State Senior Games eventually turned out to be the game changing career defining moment in her lifetime although quite well past her prime peak years. She first took up pole vaulting at the age of 65 and she went onto claim her honor as the world's oldest competitive female pole vaulter and she even holds the age group world record in pole vaulting. She made a name for herself during the 2019 World Masters Indoor Athletics Championships, where she delivered career best performances garnering a collection of medal tally under her belt in the 80 to 85 age division, including five gold medals (pole vault, pentathlon, high jump, hurdles, and the 4 x 200-meter relay) and two silver medals (triple jump and long jump).

On 22 July 2021, she set a world record in the women's over 85 age category in the women's 80m hurdles at the USATF Masters Championships. In 2022, USA Track and Field named her the overall Masters Athlete of the Year. She won 18 national titles all in a single calendar year in 2022 including 8 indoors and 10 outdoors to prove her mettle in the athletics arena. In June 2024, Meiler was reported to be the oldest of 200 athletes to compete at the 2024 USA Track & Field New England and East Region Indoor Masters Championship in Rhode Island. She gained widespread media attention and global fame prior to the lead up to the 2024 Summer Olympics in recognition of her fitness and age defying athleticism and for shattering stereotypes over age limitations. On 18 July 2024, she set a new world record in the women's over 90 age category in the women's 80m hurdles during the USATF Masters Championships. She also stars in the Olympic channel Body̝+ series where she gives guidelines and instructions with her firm intention to push the limits of what her body can do in hopes of more record setting moments.
