= Masters W80 200 metres world record progression =

This is the progression of world record improvements of the 200 metres W80 division of Masters athletics.

Key

Incomplete information Wind aided Pending better indoor records

Hand	Auto	Wind	Athlete	Nationality	Birthdate	Age	Location	Date	Ref
	34.38	(+0.5 m/s)	Carol LaFayette-Boyd	Canada	17 May 1942	80 years, 75 days	Regina	31 July 2022	
	35.00	(+0.5 m/s)	Carol LaFayette-Boyd	Canada	17 May 1942	80 years, 73 days	Regina	29 July 2022	
	34.90	(+1.8 m/s)	Carol LaFayette-Boyd	Canada	17 May 1942	80 years, 61 days	Saskatoon	17 July 2022	
	35.34	(+1.5 m/s)	Kathy Bergen	United States	24 December 1939	81 years, 164 days	Santa Ana	6 June 2021	
	36.80	(+0.3 m/s)	Irene Obera	United States	7 December 1933	80 years, 225 days	Winston-Salem	20 July 2014	
	35.69	NWI	Irene Obera	United States	7 December 1933	80 years, 154 days	San Mateo	10 May 2014	
	36.53 i		Irene Obera	United States	7 December 1933	80 years, 98 days	Boston	15 March 2014	
	38.10	(−0.2 m/s)	Irene Obera	United States	7 December 1933	80 years, 42 days	Berkeley	18 January 2014	
	39.92	(−0.1 m/s)	Emma Mazzenga	Italy	1 August 1933	80 years, 42 days	Marcon	12 September 2013	
	40.78	NWI	Mitsu Morita	Japan	29 June 1923	80 years, 77 days	Suizenji	14 September 2003	
	39.78	NWI	Polly Clarke	United States	17 July 1910	80 years, 18 days	Indianapolis	4 August 1990	
