= Masters W70 triple jump world record progression =

This is the progression of world record improvements of the triple jump W70 division of Masters athletics.

Key

Incomplete information Pending Wind aided better indoor records

Distance	Wind	Athlete	Nationality	Birthdate	Location	Date
8.98	-0.3	Akiko Ohinata	Japan	14 December 1949	Tajimi	1 May 2021
8.65	-0.6	Christiane Schmalbruch	Germany	8 January 1937	Lahti	28 July 2009
8.46	0.8	Christiane Schmalbruch	Germany	8 January 1937	Riccione	4 September 2007
8.25	3.4	Audrey Lary	United States	9 May 1934	Eugene	26 June 2004
8.09	-0.4	Audrey Lary	United States	9 May 1934	Decatur	8 July 2004
7.99 i		Asta Larsson	Sweden	23 October 1931	San Sebastián	9 March 2003
7.87		Shirley Peterson	New Zealand	24 July 1928	Christchurch	20 February 1999
7.46		Gwen Davidson	Australia	28 November 1922	Melbourne	21 March 1993
7.18		Mary Patridge	Australia	11 February 1923	Newcastle	19 October 1991
