= Masters W65 triple jump world record progression =

This is the progression of world record improvements of the triple jump W65 division of Masters athletics.

Key

Incomplete information Pending Wind aided better indoor record

Distance	Wind	Athlete	Nationality	Birthdate	Age	Location	Date
10.12	(+1.9 m/s)	Petra Herrmann	Germany	2 September 1959	65 years, 26 days	Neukieritzsch	28 September 2024
9.86		Akiko Ohinata	Japan	14 December 1949	67 years, 99 days	Daegu	23 March 2017
9.84	(+1.2 m/s)	Akiko Ohinata	Japan	14 December 1949	65 years, 182 days	Nagano	14 June 2015
9.68	NWI	Akiko Ohinata	Japan	14 December 1949	65 years, 154 days	Ise	17 May 2015
9.53	(+2.8 m/s)	Edith Graff	Belgium	9 November 1941	65 years, 299 days	Riccione	4 September 2007
9.51	(+1.2 m/s)	Christiane Schmalbruch	Germany	8 January 1937	65 years, 226 days	Potsdam	22 August 2002
9.03	(+0.4 m/s)	Shirley Peterson	New Zealand	24 July 1928	65 years, 81 days	Miyazaki	13 October 1993
7.95	NWI	Gwen Davidson	Australia	28 November 1922	69 years, 139 days	Hobart	15 April 1992
