= Christopher Coleman (bobsleigh) =

American bobsledder

Christopher Coleman, born February 18, 1967, is an Olympic bobsledder who competed in the 1992 and 1994 Winter Olympics for the USA. He currently works as the Athlete Marketer at the United States Olympic Committee. He is a photographer with works on display with the Art of the Olympians.
