= Masters W75 discus world record progression =

Masters W75 discus world record progression is the progression of world record improvements of the discus W75 division of Masters athletics. Records must be set in properly conducted, official competitions under the standing IAAF rules unless modified by World Masters Athletics. The W75 division consists of female athletes who have reached the age of 75 but have not yet reached the age of 80, so exactly from their 75th birthday to the day before their 80th birthday. The W75 division now throws a 0.75 kg implement. Prior to the 2010 season, W75 threw a 1.0 kg implement.

Key

Incomplete information Pending

0.75 kg

Distance	Athlete	Nationality	Birthdate	Location	Date
30.80	Anne Chatrine Rühlow	Germany	30.09.1936	Erfurt	03.03.2012
30.07	Rosemary Chrimes	United Kingdom	19.05.1933	Leicester	13.06.2010

1 kg

Distance	Athlete	Nationality	Birthdate	Location	Date
29.07	Rosemary Chrimes	United Kingdom	19.05.1933	Ljubljana	31.07.2008
25.07	Ingeborg Pfuller	Argentina	01.01.1932	Riccione	04.09.2007
22.94	Ruth Seeger	United States	1924	Austin	12.04.2003
22.88	Annchen Reile	Germany	21.07.1915		23.09.1990
22.30	Kaija Jortikka	Finland	23.11.1923	Ikaalinen	22.08.1999
