= Masters W60 hammer throw world record progression =

This is the progression of world record improvements of the hammer throw W60 division of Masters athletics.

Key

Incomplete information Pending

| Distance | Athlete | Nationality | Birthdate | Age | Location | Date | Ref |
|---|---|---|---|---|---|---|---|
| 47.28 m | Gonny Mik | Netherlands | 23 May 1965 | 60 years, 99 days | Bremen | 30 August 2025 | |
| 47.19 m | Claudine Cacaut | France | 23 November 1964 | 60 years, 122 days | Gainesville | 25 March 2025 | |
| 47.17 m | Mirja Kokko | Finland | 8 August 1961 | 60 years, 294 days | Kouvola | 29 May 2022 | |
| 47.05 m | Mirja Kokko | Finland | 8 August 1961 | 60 years, 34 days | Kouvola | 11 September 2021 | |
| 46.84 m | Oneithea Lewis | United States | 11 June 1960 | 61 years, 41 days | Ames | 22 July 2021 | |
| 46.09 m | Helen Searle | Australia | 12 July 1939 | 62 years, 79 days | Canberra | 29 September 2001 | |
