= San Francisco Track and Field Club =

American nonprofit athletics club

- San Francisco Track and Field Club Logo
- Founded: 1982
- Location: San Francisco
- Affiliations: USATF, Federation of gay games
- Website: www.sftrackandfield.com

San Francisco Track and Field Club is a California non-profit, public-benefit corporation established in January, 2007. Since 2007, San Francisco Track and Field Club (SFT&FC) has maintained its United States Track & Field (USATF) club membership and hosts the USATF-sanctioned Pride Track & Field Meet annually.

== History ==
SFT&FC began in the fall of 1982, immediately following the first Gay Games in San Francisco. Dr. Tom Waddell, founder of the Gay Games, had put together a team of athletes to represent San Francisco in track and field at the Games. Those athletes had such a positive and uplifting experience from participating in the first Gay Games that they banded together to form the San Francisco Track and Field Club. The formation of the Club enabled them to stay together and continue training and competing in the years between each Gay Games, allowing them to strive for personal excellence in athletics, which is a hallmark of Waddell's Gay Games philosophy. Since 1982, SFT&FC has sent its athletes to all of the eight Gay Games. In 2012, SFT&FC celebrated its 30th anniversary. San Francisco mayor Ed Lee issued Certificate of Honor for its work and commitment in promoting track and field competition for the LGBT community.

== Activities ==
SFT&FC meets every Sunday morning during a season that generally lasts from late January to early October. There are a number of track meets available to athletes, from local all-comer meets to National Championships. A list of potential meets is available at each practice. Everyone is encouraged to participate at the level they feel comfortable with. In addition to track and field training and competition, SFT&FC has served the local community by providing free track and field clinics and worked with the City of San Francisco to update Kezar track.

== Competition ==
SFT&FC hosts its own track meet, Pride Track & Field Meet. The annual event is well attended by local master and senior athletes and has been venues for new American records and world records. In addition to competing at its own track meet, SFT&FC also sends its athletes to various local, national and international competitions, such as:

- USATF Pacific Association Outdoor Track & Field Championships
- Gay Games
- World Outgames
- North American Outgames
- National Senior Games
- California Senior Games
- World Masters Athletics Championships
