= Masters W50 400 metres world record progression =

This is the progression of world record improvements of the 400 metres W50 division of Masters athletics.

Key

Incomplete information Pending

Hand	Auto	Athlete	Nationality	Birthdate	Age	Location	Date
	57.55	Sally Cooke	United Kingdom	9 April 1970	52 years, 64 days	Derby	12 June 2022
	57.66	Marie Lande Mathieu	Puerto Rico	26 November 1956	50 years, 282 days	Riccione	4 September 2007
	58.51	Marge Allison	Australia	13 September 1944	50 years, 312 days	Buffalo	22 July 1995
	1:01.11	Jan Hynes	Australia	3 April 1944	50 years, 153 days	Brisbane	3 September 1994
	1:01.82	Brunhilde Hoffmann	Germany	17 August 1939	52 years, 317 days	Kristiansand	29 June 1992
1:02.8		Irene Obera	United States	7 December 1933	34 years, 320 days	St. George	22 October 1988
1:03.2		Anne McKenzie	South Africa	28 July 1925	50 years, 79 days	Greater Point	15 October 1975
