= Masters W85 80 metres hurdles world record progression =

This is the progression of world record improvements of the 80 metres hurdles W85 division of Masters athletics.

Key

Incomplete information Wind aided Pending

Hand	Auto	Wind	Athlete	Nationality	Birthdate	Location	Date	Ref
	26.69	(+0.6 m/s)	Florence Meiler	United States	7 June 1934	Ames	22 July 2021	
	26.98	(+0.6 m/s)	Florence Meiler	United States	7 June 1934	Ames	12 July 2019	
