= Art of the Olympians =

Olympian and Paralympian artist organization

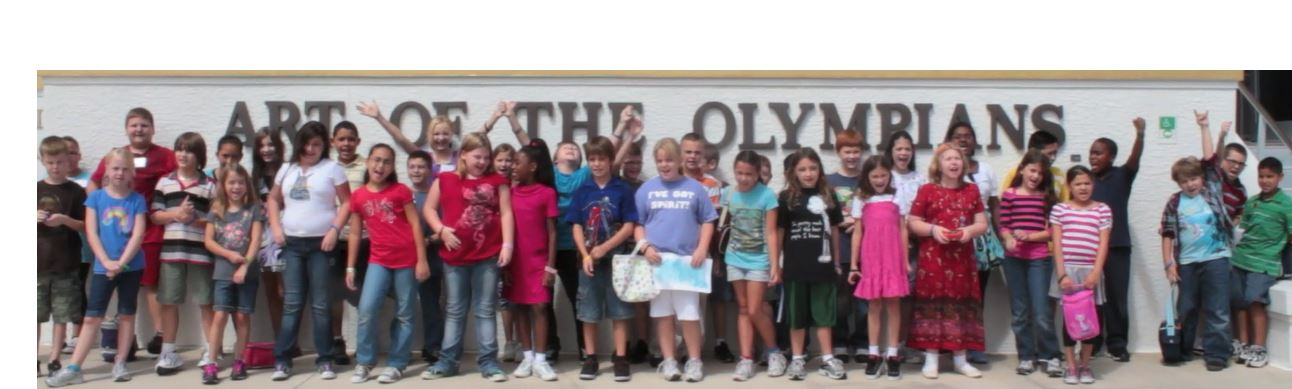
A school class pose for a photo during an AOTO workshop break.

Art of the Olympians (AOTO) is an organization and program of Olympian and Paralympian artists that promotes the Olympic ideals of values, integrity, character, respect, honor, and work ethic through exhibitions and educational programs. It puts on traveling exhibitions, runs workshops, organizes talks at schools, to show and discuss the connection between sport, art, and the Olympics. AOTO previously operated a museum.

AOTO is a program of the non-profit Al Oerter Foundation.

== History ==
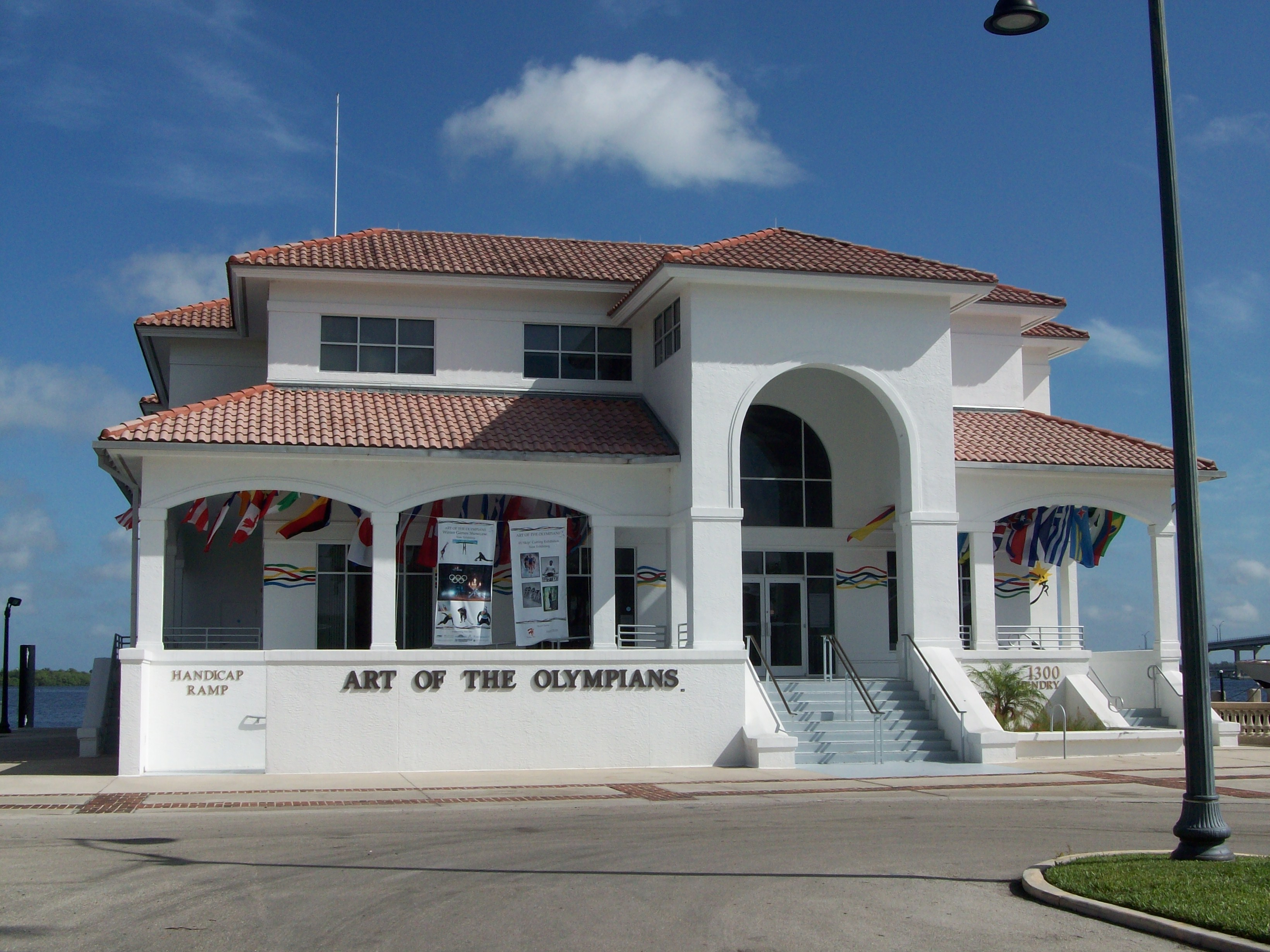
Art of the Olympians museum in Fort Myers, Florida, circa 2010

Art of the Olympians was founded in 2006 by American Olympic gold medalist discus thrower and artist Al Oerter, who died in 2007. In 2006, the organization put on a touring exhibition of Art by Olympians. Art of the Olympians put on an exhibition at the 2008 Summer Olympics in Beijing, China. AOTO also held a 2008 exhibition at the Rauschenberg Gallery, Edison College in Fort Myers, Florida.

In January 2010, the organization opened the Art of the Olympians Museum and the Al Oerter Center for Excellence in downtown Fort Myers, Florida.

In February 2010 Art of the Olympians held an exhibition at the XXI Olympic Winter Games in Vancouver. In 2011, graphic artist and former long jumper Bob Beamon became the CEO of the Art of the Olympians Museum and Gallery.

During the 2012 London summer Olympics AOTO held two international exhibitions in the United Kingdom. The first was held at the University College of London and the second was held in Torbay on the south coast of England.

On July 16, 2013, CEO Bob Beamon released an open letter directed to the museum's board announcing his resignation. On July 17, after 3 and a half years, the Art of the Olympians museum and the Al Oerter Center for Excellence closed its doors. On the AOTO website they posted an announcement: "It's time to reorganize and restructure the foundation. A new direction focused on National and International Exhibitions programs will further the vision of the founder." Cathy Oerter, Al Oerter's widow, is currently the CEO of Art of the Olympians.

In December 2015, Roald Bradstock became the Executive Director of the Al Oerter Foundation (AOF) and Art of the Olympians. And on December 2, Prince Albert ll of Monaco became the Trustee of the Al Oerter Foundation and Art of the Olympians.

In March 2016, Bradstock was interviewed on BBC Radio Two and then CNN International World Sport. He announced that AOTO was marking their ten-year anniversary by launching a global campaign and search for new Olympian and Paralympian artists.

On April 25, 2017, International Olympic Committee President Thomas Bach appointed Bradstock to the Olympic Culture and Heritage Commission.

On September 12, 2018 The World Olympians Association (WOA) announced the formation of a new WOA Arts Committee called "OLY Arts". Roald Bradstock was appointed the Chair of the new Committee. Fellow AOTO artists Emanuela Pierantozzi and Shane Gould joined Bradstock on the Arts Committee along with WOA President Joël Bouzou, WOA Executive Committee Member Natalie Cook and Olympian artists Pat Burgener (musician) and Takahiro Fujimoto (actor). Diane de Coubertin - granddaughter of Pierre de Coubertin, founder of the modern Olympic Games - and Francis Gabet, Director of the Olympic Foundation for Culture and Heritage were the final two other Committee members.

== Olympian artists ==
Numerous Olympians and Paralympians have contributed works to the foundation:

1. Rink Babka – Painting
2. Carl Borack – Film / Video / Photography
3. Roald Bradstock – Painting / Drawing / Collage / Performance Art
4. Greg Burns – Painting
5. Chris Coleman – Photography
6. Skip Cutting – Painting
7. Joseph Dube – Painting
8. Jean-Blaise Evéquoz – Painting
9. Peggy Fleming – Painting
10. Simon Goody – Painting
11. Shane Gould – Photography
12. Martin Hagen – Sculpture
13. Florence Griffith-Joyner – Painting
14. Kader Klouchi – Painting
15. Bill Kund – Photography
16. Queen Kyomo – Dancing
17. Nancy Lewington – Photography
18. Vincent Mathews – Mixed Media
19. Lucia Medzihradská – Mixed Media
20. Tony Moore – Poet
21. Cameron Myler – Photography
22. Al Oerter – Painting
23. Emanuela Pierantozzi – Sculpture
24. Peter Schifrin – Sculpture
25. Kate Schmidt – Painting
26. John Stillings – Painting
27. Allison Wagner – Painting
28. Larry Young – Sculpture
29. Wojciech Zablocki – Watercolor
30. Lynda Blutriech – Photography
31. Robin Cousins – performer
32. Neil Eckersley – Painter, Digital Artist
33. Kevin McMahon – Digital Media
34. Tasha Danvers – Painter, Singer
35. Chris Channon – Poet
36. Breaux Greer – Photography
37. Brenden Reilly – Drawing, Painting
38. Bob Beamon – Graphic Artist
39. Amy Acuff – Model, Painter
40. Rafer Johnson – actor
41. Gary Visconti – Painter
42. Shevon Stoddart – singer
43. Birgit Fischer – Photography
44. Eric Josjö – Photography
45. Jamie Nieto – actor, writer, director
46. Alex Fong – singer, actor
47. Michelle Campi – Painter, Poet
48. Prince Hubertus of Hohenlohe-Langenburg – Photographer, Singer
49. Cheung Ho Lun – Painter
50. Kevin Young – Drawing
51. Corinna West – Poetry
52. Pauline Gardiner – Painter
53. Jennifer Chandler – Painter
54. Reynaldo Brown – Photography
55. Shannon Miller – writer
56. Lanny Barnes – Drawing
57. John Herbert – Graphic Design
58. Ben Nighthorse Campbell – Jewelry
59. Joseph Joyce – Painter
60. Michael Murray - Painter

== Board of directors ==
The foundation has a board of directors:

- Cathy Oerter
- Markus Sherry
- Emanuela Pierantozzi
- Anita DeFrantz
- Kevin Murphy
- Jimmy Mellado
- Edward Stransenback
- Jack Scharr
- Marc Serota

== Executive Directors ==
- CEO – Cathy Oerter
- Executive Director – Roald Bradstock
