= Masters W75 3000 metres world record progression =

This is the progression of world record improvements of the 3000 metres W75 division of Masters athletics. Records must be set in properly conducted, official competitions under the standing IAAF rules unless modified by World Masters Athletics. The W75 division consists of female athletes who have reached the age of 75 but have not yet reached the age of 80, so exactly from their 75th birthday to the day before their 80th birthday.

Key

Incomplete information Pending Better indoor records

Hand	Auto	Athlete	Nationality	Birthdate	Age	Location	Date	Ref
	12:38.84	Sarah Roberts	Great Britain	6 October 1949	75 years, 280 days	Cambridge	13 July 2025	
12.47.2		Sarah Roberts	Great Britain	6 October 1949	75 years, 246 days	Stevenage	9 June 2025	
13:04.6+		Sarah Roberts	Great Britain	6 October 1949	75 years, 216 days	Bedford	10 May 2025	
	12:28.82 i	Sarah Roberts	Great Britain	6 October 1949	75 years, 171 days	Gainesville	26 March 2025	
	12:35.83 i	Sarah Roberts	Great Britain	6 October 1949	75 years, 112 days	Sheffield	26 January 2025	
	13:26.98+ (Note: by official results source; 13:31.30 by WMA source)	Jeannie Rice	United States	14 April 1948	75 years, 97 days	Greensboro	20 July 2023	
	13:55.58	Yoko Nakano	Japan	12 January 1935	77 years, 253 days	Okayama	21 September 2012	
	14:26.01	Melitta Czerwenka	Germany	30 April 1930	76 years, 60 days	Saarbrücken	29 June 2006	
