= Masters M90 100 metres world record progression =

This is the progression of world record improvements of the 100 metres M90 division of Masters athletics.

Key

Incomplete information Wind aided Pending

Hand	Auto	Wind	Athlete	Nationality	Birthdate	Age	Location	Date
	16.69	−0.6	Hiroo Tanaka	Japan	8 December 1930	90 years, 264 days	Akita	29 August 2021
	16.86	−1.7	Hiroo Tanaka	Japan	8 December 1930	90 years, 144 days	Iwate	1 May 2021
	17.53	0.8	Frederico Fischer	Brazil	6 January 1917	90 years, 241 days	Riccione	4 September 2007
	17.82	1.0	Ugo Sansonetti	Italy	10 January 1919	90 years, 199 days	Lahti	28 July 2009
	17.93	0.5	Donald Pellmann	United States	12 August 1915	90 years, 52 days	St. George	3 October 2005
	17.83		Donald Pellmann	United States	12 August 1915	90 years, 23 days	Fort Collins	4 September 2005
	18.08	–0.1	Kozo Haraguchi	Japan	20 June 1910	90 years, 89 days	Miyazaki	17 September 2000
