= Masters M85 3000 metres world record progression =

This is the progression of world record improvements of the 3000 metres M85 division of Masters athletics. Records must be set in properly conducted, official competitions under the standing IAAF rules unless modified by World Masters Athletics. The M85 division consists of male athletes who have reached the age of 85 but have not yet reached the age of 90, so exactly from their 85th birthday to the day before their 90th birthday.

Key

Incomplete information Pending Better indoor record

Hand	Auto	Athlete	Nationality	Birthdate	Age	Location	Date	Ref
	14:09.66	Jean Louis Esnault	France	19 January 1940	85 years, 171 days	Chartres	9 July 2025	
	13:39.24 i	Jean-Louis Esnault	France	19 January 1940	85 years, 65 days	Gainesville	25 March 2025	
	13:41.96 i	Ed Whitlock	Canada	6 March 1931	85 years, 13 days	Kamloops	19 March 2016	
14:13.4 h		Julian Bernal Medina	Spain	16 February 1919	86 years, 4 days	A Coruña	20 February 2005	
16:04.6 h		Petter Green	Norway	24 March 1912	85 years, 86 days	Stjørdal	18 June 1997	
