= Masters W70 3000 metres world record progression =

This is the progression of world record improvements of the 3000 metres W70 division of Masters athletics. Records must be set in properly conducted, official competitions under the standing IAAF rules unless modified by World Masters Athletics. The W70 division consists of female athletes who have reached the age of 70 but have not yet reached the age of 75, so exactly from their 70th birthday to the day before their 75th birthday.

Key

Incomplete information Pending better indoor records

| Hand | Auto | Athlete | Nationality | Birthdate | Location | Date |
|---|---|---|---|---|---|---|
| | 12:13.12 | Angela Copson | United Kingdom | 20 April 1947 | Solihull | 1 September 2018 |
| | 12.37.45i | Angela Copson | United Kingdom | 20 April 1947 | Lee Valley | 11 March 2018 |
| | 12:52.03 | Lavinia Petrie | Australia | 13 September 1943 | Bendigo | 18 November 2014 |
| | 13:07.79 | Lavinia Petrie | Australia | 13 September 1943 | Ballarat | 24 January 2014 |
| | 13:24.78 | Elfriede Hodapp | Germany | 15 June 1935 | Rastatt | 21 August 2006 |
| | 15:40.90 | Alda DeGrandis | Italy | 10 November 1914 | Turin | 09 May 1985 |
