= Frederico Fischer =

Brazilian athlete (born 1917)

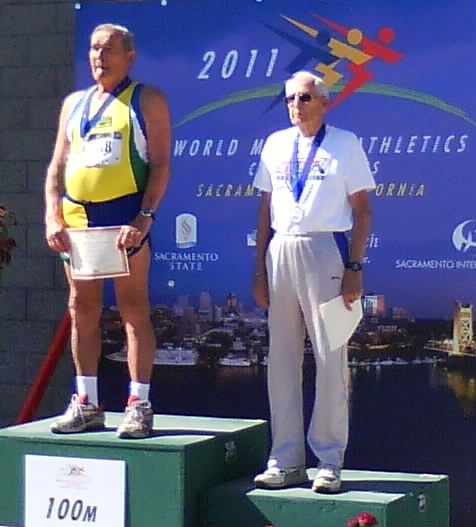
Frederico Fischer on the awards stand at the 2011 Masters Athletics World Championships in Sacramento, California

Frederico Fischer (born 6 January 1917) is a Brazilian athlete. He was the Masters M95 world record holder in the 100 metres, with a time of 20.41 seconds set in Porto Alegre, Brazil in 2012.

== Early life ==
Fischer was born in Ribeirão Preto, São Paulo on 6 January 1917. He is of German ancestry, with his father moving to Brazil in 1909, becoming successful in selling prepared meats. His older brother was born in Germany (and lived to almost 100 years old). Fischer also has a sister who, as of the last report, was still alive at age 99 in 2012. During World War I his family was ostracized when Brazil joined the war, causing a move to Jaguariaíva where his father drowned in the river. Frederico grew up in Pompeia, São Paulo, taking care of the family while his mother worked in a factory. As he got older he played football as a goalie with the club in Santo Amaro and rode bicycles. When his brother built a boat, he joined and took up sailing joining the Club de Regatas Tietê. Frederico got his first job in a pig iron factory at age 15, but studied to be an accountant which became his career.

== Athletics ==
In his mid 20s he drifted into the sport of Athletics, became the regional champion in the 400 metres hurdles and decathlon, chasing the records of Sylvio de Magalhães Padilha training two to three times a week. But when he asked for time off work to compete at a higher level, his boss gave him the ultimatum, "You choose, your enjoyment or your job," he chose his job.

He married his wife, Teresa in 1947. She still supports his endeavors. In that era, athletes were expected to stop playing sports by age 40, "because it was too dangerous for the heart." But he remained active with his athletics club. While working as a director of a ceramics factory in Mauá, his club sponsored a run for distance runners. Frederico joined in. Sitting in a car after the run he realized perspiration, getting the blood circulating, all of problems he wanted to solve became clearer. He got more active. His group was approached by a group from Chile led by Hernán Figueroa, who were trying to start a veteran athlete group. Frederico joined in 1973, by 1975 he was president of the Athletic Association Veterans of São Paulo.

Fischer began attending the World Masters Athletics Championships starting in 1979, in Hannover, Germany. He says he has become addicted to the competition. It was fourteen years later in Carolina, Puerto Rico when his gold medal haul started with five wins at 100 metres, 200 metres, 400 metres, shot put and discus. Fischer's last participation at the World Masters Athletics Championships was in 2015, at 98. He received worldwide media attention due to the 100 meters race in which he narrowly lost against his 96-year old rival Charles Eugster. He turned 100 in January 2017.

What motivates me to train are the championships. Because if it were not so, you will give up, you will relax ....

— Frederico Fischer

== See also ==
- List of centenarians (sportspeople)
