= Marie Mathieu =

Puerto Rican sprinter

Personal information
- Born: November 28, 1956 (age 69)

Sport
- Sport: Track and field
Medal record
Representing Puerto Rico
Central American and Caribbean Games
Silver medal – second place	1982 Havana	4x400m relay
Bronze medal – third place	1982 Havana	100m
Bronze medal – third place	1982 Havana	200m

Marie Lande Mathieu (born November 28, 1956) is a Puerto Rican former sprinter who competed at the 1984 Summer Olympics in Los Angeles, reaching the semifinals of the individual 400 meters and anchoring the 4 × 400-meter relay team alongside her younger sister, Evelyn. Mathieu achieved global prominence by capturing multiple sprint sweeps at the World Masters Athletics Championships and setting enduring masters world records in the 400 meters across the W45 (56.15), W50 (57.66), and W55 (1:00.56) age divisions.

== Career ==
She competed in the 400 metres at the 1984 Olympics. Marie qualified for the semi-final round but did not qualify for the finals, finishing seventh in her semi-final race. Later she joined her younger sister Evelyn Mathieu in the 4 × 400 metres relay, Evelyn running the lead off leg and Marie running the anchor leg in the qualifying round. The team qualified for the finals, but did not start.

Marie has continued to run into masters athletics age groups. In 2003, at the home town World Masters Athletics Championships held in Carolina, Puerto Rico, she set the still standing W45 world record in the 400 metres at 56.15. She also won two other sprinting events in the same meet. Four years later, in the same meet, without the home town advantage, she set the current W50 record at 57.66 in Riccione, Italy. Six years later, she again repeated the feat, setting the W55 world record at 1:00.56 at the World Championships in Porto Alegre, Brazil. She competed at the 2010 NACAC Masters Championships, where she set meet record in the 100 metres, 200 metres and 400 metres. She had swept those same three sprinting events at the 2009 World Championships in Lahti, Finland.
