= Masters W70 200 metres world record progression =

This is the progression of world record improvements of the 200 metres W70 division of Masters athletics.

Key

Incomplete information Wind aided Pending

Hand	Auto	Wind	Athlete	Nationality	Birthdate	Age	Location	Date	Ref
	30.05	+0.6	Karla del Grande	Canada	27 March 1953	71 years, 94 days	Toronto	29 June 2024	
	30.54	+0.2	Sara Montecinos	Chile	8 March 1954	70 years, 93 days	Santiago	9 June 2024	
	31.30	+0.7	Ingrid Meier	Germany	1 April 1947	70 years, 92 days	Zittau	2 July 2017	
	31.38	+2.5	Kathy Bergen	United States	24.12.1939		Moorpark	23.10.2011	
	31.39	+1.2	Kathy Bergen	United States	24.12.1939		Pasadena	21.07.2012	
	31.65		Kathy Bergen	United States	24.12.1939		San Diego	24.09.2011	
	31.45	+2.0	Margaret Peters	New Zealand	18.10.1933		Auckland	21.03.2004	
	31.86		Paula Schneiderhan	Germany	16.11.1921		Stuttgart	12.07.1992	
	32.24	+0.7	Paula Schneiderhan	Germany	16.11.1921		Kristiansand	01.07.1992	
	34.2		Polly Clarke	United States	17 July 1910	71 years, 51 days		6 September 1981	
