= Roald Bradstock =

British javelin thrower

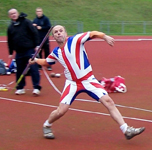

Personal information
- Nationality: British (English)
- Born: 24 April 1962 (age 64) Hertford Heath, England
- Height: 180 cm (5 ft 11 in)
- Weight: 95 kg (209 lb)

Sport
- Sport: Athletics
- Event: javelin thrower
- Club: Enfield Harriers

Arne Roald Bradstock is a two time Olympic javelin thrower from England who competed at the 1984 Summer Olympics and the 1988 Summer Olympics. and a three-time Olympic artist known as the "Olympic Picasso" and credited with creating a new art genre - The Olympism Art Genre - that captures the Olympic values in a visual art form.

== Biography ==
Bradstock was born on April 24, 1962, in Hertford Heath, Hertfordshire, England. In 1981 Bradstock, aged 19, threw the senior men's 800 gram javelin 83.20m. He also won the silver medal at the 1981 European Athletics Junior Championships behind Uwe Hohn of East Germany. He finished that year being ranked number two in the World Junior rankings, again behind Uwe Hohn of East Germany. Bradstock competed for the SMU Mustangs track and field team in University Park, Texas, where he was a three-time All-American and finished runner-up in the javelin at the 1984 NCAA Division I Outdoor Track and Field Championships.

In 1985 he became the first British Javelin thrower to break the 90-meter barrier with the "Old Rule" javelin with a Commonwealth Record of 91.40m / 299 ft 10". The following year, in 1986, he became the first man to surpass the 80m barrier with the "New Rule" javelin with a world leading throw of 81.74m. In 1987 he improved on his mark with a throw of 83.84m / 275 ft 1".

In 1992 he was an alternate for the GB Olympic Team and in 1996 was an alternate for the USA Olympic team. Bradstock competed in the 2000, 2004, 2008 USAT&F Olympic Trials and then, for his 8th and final time at age 50, the 2012 UK Olympic Trials where he came second.

In addition to being an Olympic athlete, Bradstock is also an Olympic artist dubbed "The Olympic Picasso". In 2000 he won the United States Olympic Committee ( [USOC] ) Sport Art Competition. His winning artwork was exhibited at the International Olympic Museum in Lausanne as part of the cultural activities leading up to the 2000 Sydney Olympic Games. His winning painting, titled "Struggle for Perfection" then went on to be part of an International exhibition at the International Olympic Committee (IOC) museum in Lausanne as part of the 2000 Sydney Olympics cultural events.

In 2003 Bradstock won the prestigious International Sports Artist of the Year. This award was given by the United States Sport Academy and American Sport Museum and Archives in recognition of Bradstock unique award-winning style of art called "athletic abstraction".

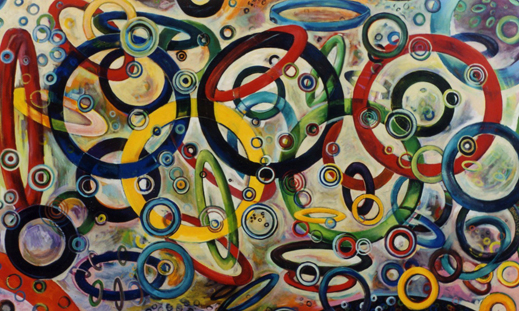
"Struggle for Perfection": 2000 USOC Sport Art competition gold medal-winning painting by Roald Bradstock

In early 2006 he became a founding member of an Olympic revival movement called Art of the Olympians. In late 2006, after the BBC heard of an ambitious proposal Bradstock had for the 2012 London Organizing Committee of the Olympic Games which would combine sport and art in a revolutionary way and scale, he became nicknamed "The Olympic Picasso". In December 2007 Bradstock began posting athletic and artistic videos on YouTube at "roald62". The videos range from the serious to the humorous. He is seen competing breaking national, international and world records in the javelin throw. He can also be seen throwing everything and anything from a dead fish on a beach across the Alabama / Florida State line to throwing a kitchen sink as part of a "Random objects throwing competition" that was held on an airport runway in England as part of a UK television series on Channel Four called the McCain Track and Field Show.

In 2008 Bradstock competed in his 7th Olympic Trials ( 4 UK Olympic Trials, 3 US Olympic Trials ). At age 46 he was the oldest competitor at the 2008 USATF Olympic Trials. Bradstock received international media attention while competing at the trials on 4 July 2008 for wearing three different, brightly coloured, hand painted outfits during his three throws. He also threw three different hand painted javelins – each one matching a corresponding outfit.

In May 2009 Bradstock threw a World Age (47) Javelin Record of 72.49m. In October 2009 the IAAF granted Bradstock a change in "Status" allowing him to compete again for his native country of Great Britain. Throughout the 2010 competitive season he broke 26 UK National age and age group records and set 3 World Age Records for a 48-year-old: 70.16m, 70.40m and 71.07m. He finished in 8th place at the 2010 UK Trials and the following week won the 2010 UK Masters Championships smashing the meet record with all 6 throws. In June 2010 Bradstock's artistic accomplishments were recognized in a new international contemporary Sport Art book written by the American Sport Museum and Archives (ASAMA). The chapter on Bradstock is titled, "The Olympic Picasso". On 8 January 2011 Bradstock threw 71.83 m or 235 ft 8 in in a competition in Clermont, Florida. This throw broke the 12-year-old UK Masters Record and broke his own World Age (48) Record. On 30 April 2011 in Radford, Virginia, he set a World Age (49) record of 70 m. Three weeks later in Tucson, Arizona on 19 May, he broke his UK Masters Record 3 more times and set 3 New World Age (49) records, too. His throws, measuring 72.32 m, 72.87 m and then 74.73 m pushed him up to number 3 on the 2011 UK Rankings—at that time. It also qualified him for his 8th Olympic Trials in 2012 when he would be 50 years old.

In the Spring of 2010 Bradstock was appointed Legacy Ambassador in the UK for the Youth Sport Trust's 2012 Sports Colleges Legacy Program. This appointment came after working with the Youth Sport Trust for 2 years. During that time he gave lectures and workshops at dozens of Sports Colleges around England on the connection between Sport and Art. On 2 June 2012 in Clermont, Florida Bradstock competed in his first competition as a 50-year-old. The result: He smashed the M50 World Age Group Record with a 700 javelin by over 5 metres with a throw of 76.15m. The previous record was 71.01m thrown in 2007. Three weeks later on 23 June 2012 Roald Bradstock threw in his 8th Olympic Trials in Birmingham, England. His first throw was another M50 World Age Group Record this time with an 800g javelin. His throw of 72.78m was over a 7-meter improvement on the existing World Record. The previous record was 65.76m held by Larry Stuart in 1988. Bradstock's throw won him a silver medal at the trials where he was not only the oldest athlete in any event but became the oldest medalist in any event in 76 years since 1936. In 2013 Bradstock was one of three contemporary British artists (the other two being Bill Jacklin and Maggi Hambling) included in UK’s National High school GCSE (General Certificate of Secondary Education) Fine Art Exam (Question 7 Movement – slides 22, 23, 24 & 25). Marcel Duchamp, Henri Matisse, William Turner and the Italian Futurists Umberto Boccioni, Luigi Russolo, Carlo Carra, Giacomo Balla and Gino Severini were the other artists in this section. In late November, 2015 Bradstock became the Executive Director of the Art of the Olympians (AOTO) and the Al Oerter Foundation (AOF). In March 2016, the ten year anniversary of AOTO, Bradstock launched a global campaign and search to find new Olympian and Paralympian artists to join the organization. He first made the announcement on BBC Radio Two and then on CNN's World Sport. On April 25, 2017, International Olympic Committee President (IOC), Thomas Bach, appointed Bradstock to the Olympic Culture and Heritage Commission.

On May 6, 2017, Bradstock competed for the first time in 5 years and broke the British M55 Masters Javelin Record of 55.10m with 3 throws: 59.61m, 61.99m and 62.88m. The Following week on May 13, in Clermont, Florida he broke his own M55 British Masters Record 3 more times with throws of 63.31m, 64.95m and 66.76m. His throw of 66.76m also broke the Masters World M55 Javelin Record. List of world records in masters athletics#Javelin throw

In February 2018, Bradstock became part of Olympic history when he participated in the first ever Olympic Art Project during the 2018 Winter Olympic Games in PyeongChang, South Korea. He was one of 4 Olympian artists that took part in the Olympic Artist in Residence project that had 2 components: #1 Creating a series of short films. #2 Creating a series of paintings. Both projects were about Olympians created by Olympians for Olympians. Greek Olympic long-distance runner Alexi Pappas created a series of short films. Jean Blaise Evequoz - 1976 Olympic Bronze medalist in fencing from Switzerland - Lanny Barnes - 5 time American Winter Olympian in the Biathlon assisted Bradstock in the painting project where he was lead artist and instigator.

A total of 15 paintings were created during the 2018 Olympic Art painting project - one painting for each of the 15 sports at the Winter Olympic Games. When the paintings were arranged in 3 rows of 5 they created a larger painting revealing the Olympic rings. A total of 111 Olympians from 39 countries took part in creating the painting(s) including such notable Olympians as IOC President Thomas Bach, World Olympians Association President Joel Bouzou and Prince Albert II of Monaco. Diane and Alexandra de Navacelle de Coubertin, family members of the founder of the modern Olympic Games - Baron Pierre de Coubertin - also helped with this historic and World Record breaking project.

On September 12, 2018, The World Olympians Association announced the formation of an arts committee. Bradstock was appointed the chair. Fellow artists Emanuela Pierantozzi and Shane Gould joined Bradstock on the committee along with World Olympians Association President Joël Bouzou, Executive Committee Member Natalie Cook and Olympian artists Pat Burgener (musician) and Takahiro Fujimoto. Diane de Coubertin, granddaughter of Pierre de Coubertin, founder of the modern Olympic Games - and Francis Gabet, director of the Olympic Foundation for Culture and Heritage were the final two non-Olympian committee members. On the same day (September 12, 2018) Bradstock also won the (M55) Javelin at the World Masters Championships, in Malaga, Spain. He won with the last throw of competition with a distance of 61.72 m. Among the 37 javelin throwers he beat were Danis Kula, 1980 Olympic Champion. On May 5, 2019, in Clermont, Florida Bradstock broke the World Age (57) Record twice with throws of 63.08 m and then 63.88 m. His performance also moved him to #1 on the 2019 World Masters M55 Rankings - over 14 meters further than the #2 ranked athlete.

The following month in Kolkata, India at the St Lawrence Boys School's Olympic Day celebrations, called "Expression 2019", Bradstock was joined by Diane de Navacelle de Coubertin and set a World Selfie Record of 192 selfies in just 3 minutes with the school's children. The World Record marked the beginning of a new project Bradstock was working on called "Olympic Selfie".

On June 24, 2021, the IOC announced the inaugural Olympic Agora that would take place in Tokyo during the Tokyo 2020 Olympic Games. Bradstock was one of 6 athlete artists – five Olympians and one Paralympian – selected by the Olympic Foundation for Culture and Heritage to be a part of the first virtual Olympian Artist-in-Residence Exhibition and Programme and create original works for a unique and historic exhibition in Tokyo. The other participants included Ciara Michel (Great Britain, Volleyball, London 2012); Slaven Dizdarević (Slovak Republic, Track and Field, Beijing 2008); Kelly Salchow MacArthur (USA, Rowing, Sydney 2000 and Athens 2004); Gregory Burns (USA, Swimming, Barcelona 1992, Atlanta 1996 and Sydney 2000); and Hannah Wilkinson (New Zealand, Football, London 2012 and Rio 2016). Bradstock is quoted in the IOC press release saying: "All my life I have been an artist and an athlete—two seemingly polar opposite pursuits. Then 25 years ago, I realized that sport and art are far more similar than they are different. When I came to this realization, everything changed for me. It changed my approach to my sports training and how and what I created in my art studio." As no foreign spectators were allowed to attend the Tokyo 2020 Olympic Games due to the COVID-19 global pandemic, the IOC and Olympic Foundation for Culture and Heritage created the Olympic Agora website with virtual tours of the Olympian Artist-in-Residence Noren Curtains Exhibition so a global audience could see each artists work. Bradstock's participation in the Tokyo 2020 Exhibition also made Olympic history, as he became the first ever 3-time Olympic Artist - the first two being in 2000 and 2018.

== Birth of the Olympism art genre ==
In early May 2024 over a 72- hour period, Bradstock and his art, were featured in 3 separate French publications – each one referencing his artwork as capturing the Olympic ethos and embracing the ideals of Olympism. In the first publication Beaux Arts Magazine, Bradstock was featured with 5 other Olympian artists (4 Olympians and 1 Paralympian) who were participating in the Paris 2024 Olympian Artists exhibition and education program. While Bradstock led the first Olympian artist program at the PyeongChang Winter Olympics in 2018, and was a participant in the Tokyo 2020 Olympic Games Olympian Artist program, he was not part of the IOC’s Artists program in the Paris 2024 Olympics. The second publication that referenced Bradstock, his artwork and his art projects as capturing and embracing Pierre de Coubertin’s Olympic ideals was a book written by Diane de Coubertin – Pierre de Coubertin’s great, great, grandniece. The third publication was an art history book - Le Sport Dans L’Art – written by Yann Descamps and George Vigarello, published by Citadelles & Mazenod. Some other notable artists included in this book were Rembrandt, Rubens, Degas, Seurat, Manet, Rodin, Munch, Muybridge, Lichtenstein, Hockney, and Warhol.

On July 26, 2024, a few hours before the opening ceremony for the Paris 2024 Olympic Games, CNN International aired a sit-down, in-person interview with Bradstock to discuss his historic artistic accomplishment of creating a new art genre called “Olympism” or “Olympicism”. CNN aired the piece multiple times over the weekend (July 27 and 28). The TV interview followed an article posted on July 25, 2024, featuring Bradstock on the CNN website under the heading - The ‘Olympic Picasso’ finally finds recognition for his athletics-inspired art. This article also acknowledged his historic artistic achievement.

The CNN interview was picked up by over a hundred TV stations across America and Canada and posted on their respective TV station websites under the heading: Meet the brilliant ‘Olympic Picasso,’ a man who captures the art of athletics. A few weeks later, in mid-August 2024, there were dozens of publications in Asia that had articles about Bradstock and his new “Olympism” art genre.

In January 2025 Bradstock led the first ever “Olympism” Art-in-Sport education program which ran in Lake Placid, New York. Joining Bradstock, to work with teachers and students on this program, were Olympian artists Neil Eckersley and Annabel Eyres from Great Britain, Valerie Gruest from Guatemala and USA’s Lanny Barnes. Additionally, USA’s Paralympian Beth Livingston rounded out the group. The program was run by the Al Oerter Foundation in partnership with Olympic Regional Development Authority (ORDA), New York State Art Teachers Association (NYSATA) Region 5, Lake Placid Center for the Arts (LPCA), the Leroy Neiman foundation, with the support of New York State District 115 assemblyman Billy Jones. Over 30 schools and 500 students participated in the seven-week long program, that ended with a standing room only awards ceremony and exhibition at the Lake Placid Olympic Convention Center on March 8, 2025.

As part of the program, during the ceremony, a 24-panel piece mural measuring 80” x 144” was unveiled. The piece, titled “Together,” embraced every aspect of the new “Olympism” art genre from the repetitious stylings to the subject matter, to the time and timing of how and why it was produced. The collaborative, interactive acrylic painting celebrates the last (first) 100 years of the winter Olympic and Paralympic Games. As part of the overall program that focused on the Olympism art genre, a hundred high school students added their names and the names of 57 winter Olympians and Paralympians from Lake Placid and the North Country to the painting.

On September 20th, 2025, the BBC aired an interview on the BBC World Service program "Not by the Play book" with Bradstock a.k.a. "The Olympic Picasso" about him becoming recognized by scholars, academics and historians around the world as having created a new art genre, specifically the "Olympism Art Genre" that captures the Olympic ideals and values in a visual art form. His interview immediately followed fellow British Olympian HRH Princess Royal – Princess Anne’s interview. In his interview he discussed the upcoming world’s first exhibition of the newly recognized "Olympism Art Genre" at the 15th ArtPrize. festival in Grand Rapids, MI as THE featured artist and exhibition amongst 1100+ artists. The highlight of the "Olympism Art Genre" exhibition was a piece called "LA Rising" that embraced all the elements of the newly recognized art genre. The 10-panel piece measuring 75" x 134" was inspired by the devasting Los Angeles wildfires in January 2025 – a place where Bradstock lived, trained, worked, and coached at UCLA from 1986 to 1992. The artwork was created using charcoal (burnt wood) on paper (from wood) as a direct symbolic reference to nature, the environment, and the LA wildfires. The piece builds on the 5 Ring Olympic logo that is a reference to the 5 continents involved in the Olympic movement and adds another 2028 rings of different sizes and angles as a reference to the upcoming Olympic and Paralympic Games in Los Angeles in 2028 and about relationships between athletes and coaches, families, communities, organizations and institutions. The black and white charcoal artwork called "LA Rising" will be completed at the Grand Rapids’ ArtPrize as the visitors, children, families, athletes, and community help color in the artwork bringing color and light to the darkness that LA suffered going through the wildfires – and sending a message from one community to another of love and support to one another through the new “Olympism Art Genre” inspired imagery.

On January 28th, Bradstock was invited by the LA Sports Council to display the completed "LA Rising" colored charcoal drawing at the LA Sports Council’s 20th Award Ceremony at USC in Los Angeles.

In January 2026 Bradstock led the second “Olympism” Art-in-Sport education program called "Canvases for a New Century of Champions" which ran in Brooklyn, New York. Joining Bradstock again, to work with teachers and students on this program, were Olympian artists Neil Eckersley, Annabel Eyres, Valerie Gruest, Lanny Barnes and Paralympian Beth Livingston. In addition, Paralympian Sarah Will joined the team. The program was run by the Al Oerter Foundation in partnership with Olympic Regional Development Authority (ORDA), New York State Art Teachers Association (NYSATA), New York City Parks Foundation, with the support of New York State District 44 assemblyman Robert Carroll. Eighteen classes from 6 schools with almost 500 students participated in the four-week long program, that concluded with an awards ceremony and exhibition at the Brooklyn Botanical Gardens on March 7th, 2026.

In February 2026, Bradstock was one of three Olympians (the other two being Laurenne Ross and Neil Eckersley) from the IOC's Olympian Artist Program to have his artwork go on display at The Olympic Club in Milan, Italy during the 2026 Milan Cortina Winter Olympic Games from February 7th through February 22nd. Bradstock's massive 15-panel acrylic painting that he created and completed on site during the 2018 PyeongChang Winter Olympic Games, with the help of another 111 Olympians, was the specific piece selected for the exhibition in Milan for its historical significance in that it was the first time Olympians created art together during the Games themselves, which directly reflects Pierre de Coubertin's original idea of combining sport, culture, and education. It also launched the IOC's Olympian Artists Program and was the beginning of what has now become recognized as a new emerging art genre that captures Olympic values and ideals in a visual art form using a variety of elements including, engagement, symbolism and philosophy.

In March 2026 Bradstock was invited to join the Look Up project that began in Times Square on November 27,2025 and continues on to the European Cultural Centre's Personal Structure exhibition at the 61st International Art Exhibition of the Venice Biennale that runs from May through November 2026. Some of Bradstock's "Olympism Art Genre" work will be featured as part of this curated exhibition.

On March 22nd, 2026, Bradstock posted the Olympism Art Genre Manifesto on his website

At the beginning of June 2026, it was revealed Bradstock had been appointed to the United States Pierre de Coubertin Board of Directors as the Director of community engagement on a new website. It was also noteworthy that the new updated website dedicated an entire section to the new emerging "Olympism Art Genre" under the heading "The Art of Olympism" And at the bottom of that section on the new website it had another statement of interest: "As part of the new Genius of Sport exhibit at US Olympic & Paralympic Museum in Colorado Springs, Bradstock created “Pierre’s Path,” a new painting, #9 in his Olympic Rings series, that is intended to be a centerpiece of the exhibit as it travels across the US on the road to the Los Angeles 2028 Olympic Games."

At almost the exact same time that the new United States Pierre de Coubertin website launched the 2026 Venice Art Biennial, European Culture Center's Personal Structure Confluences exhibition posted their digital catalog for the exhibition in Venice that included the LOOK UP Times Square exhibition in which Bradstock was featured with one of his "Olympism Art Genre" paintings. Of note, his painting of a surfer appears on slide 90 / page 179 of the digital catalog next an image of Andy Warhol created by Karen Bysedt & Shepard Fairey.

In October 2026, the New York State Art Teachers Association (NYSATA) published a four-page feature on Bradstock's artwork, the emerging Olympism art genre, and his educational programs in the Fall Digital and Conference Edition of NYSATA News. Written by Ed Stransenback, the article, titled "Olympian Artist/Instructor Provides Students With a Genre for Expression", examined Bradstock's approach to combining artistic expression, repetition, movement, and Olympic values through educational programs conducted by the Al Oerter Foundation's Art of the Olympians initiative. The article also documented collaborative art projects involving hundreds of students in Lake Placid and Brooklyn, New York.

The NYSATA publication featured Bradstock's 2026 collaborative drawing Faster, Higher, Stronger – Together, a 21-panel artwork measuring 120 × 196 inches (approximately 10 × 16.3 feet). Depicting four short-track speed skaters, the composition consists of 5,880 individual two-inch squares inspired by ancient Roman and Venetian mosaics. Created using recycled paper, the artwork incorporates repetition and movement, characteristics associated with Bradstock's Olympism art genre. Hundreds of students from Brooklyn and Lake Placid contributed individual artistic marks to the drawing during educational programs earlier in 2026.

The publication also announced plans for art teachers attending NYSATA's annual conference in Albany, New York, on November 21, 2026, to contribute additional marks to the collaborative artwork. A corresponding participatory event, Faster, Higher, Stronger – Together with LOOK UP, was scheduled to take place simultaneously in Venice, Italy, during the LOOK UP Conference and Closing Celebration. Organized in connection with LOOK UP's participation in the European Cultural Centre's Personal Structures 2026: Confluences exhibition, the project was designed to connect participants in Albany and Venice through contributions to sections of the same original artwork.

== The Olympic Picasso ==
=== History ===
The "Olympic Picasso" is a nickname given by the media to Bradstock. In 2000 he won the gold medal in painting in the United States Olympic Committee (USOC) Sport Art competition held by the United States Sports Academy (USSA) and American Sport Art Museum and Archives (ASAMA). His winning painting titled "Struggle for Perfection" went on to be exhibited at the International Olympic Committee's (IOC) Museum in Lausanne, Switzerland as part of the cultural events and activities leading up to the 2000 Sydney Olympic Games.

=== Timeline ===
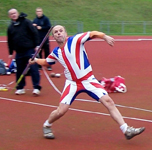
Roald Bradstock wearing one of his signature hand painted outfits.

In 2006, the phrase the "Olympic Picasso" was first seen in print in the October issue of a British athletics magazine called Athletics Weekly (AW). The article, about an ambitious Olympic Art proposal that Bradstock was pitching to the 2012 London Organising Committee of the Olympic and Paralympic Games, referenced renowned BBC sport commentator Paul Dickenson and his nickname for Roald Bradstock.

In 2008 Roald Bradstock competed in his seventh Olympic trials in Eugene, Oregon. He created a media frenzy when he stepped onto the javelin runway to take his first throw in the qualifying rounds of the 2008 US Olympic Trials on July 4. He took a total of three throws wearing different hand-painted outfits with matching hand-painted "optical" javelins each time. His first outfit was a black-and-white-striped zebra-looking costume. His second was an Olympic-themed kit with all five colors of the Olympic rings painted on it, and his final "number" was a red, white and blue outfit that he said later was to celebrate July 4, America's independence day.

Bradstock's antics on the field got national and international coverage. In a news conference immediately after the event, in which he placed 16th, he was besieged by reporters. Competing in his seventh Olympic trials and being the oldest person at the age of 46 was of little interest, but what was of interest was his "eccentric" media stunt, his hand painted outfits, his bizarre YouTube videos documenting a long list of world records for throwing strange objects from dead fish to iPhones, to the BBC's nickname for him.

Over the next four years leading up to his historic eighth Olympics trials, this time for the UK, Bradstock received a lot of press coverage on the radio, TV, newspapers and magazines around the world. He was also featured in a documentary hosted by 1968 Olympic Figure Skating Champion Peggy Fleming on the Art of The Olympians organization which was founded by four-time consecutive Olympics discus champion and icon Al Oerter.

At the 2012 British Olympic Trials, in Birmingham, England Bradstock once again pulled a "media stunt" as he wore a variety of hand-painted hats, sleeves, tights, socks and shoes during the competition that he changed between each throw for different looks. He came second with a World Age Record for a 50 year old with a throw of 72.78 m and became the oldest person to win a medal in 86 years.

Bradstock still competes in Masters competitions but is now pursuing his art career full-time.

Bradstock is also a founding member of the Art of the Olympians organization that was founded by Oerter.

In March 2016, CNN's sports anchor Patrick Snell did an interview with Bradstock titled, " Olympic Picasso" links art and sport.

On Olympic day - June 23, 2017 - the Olympic Channel covered the inaugural Sport and Art competition, called "Expression2017", held at St Lawrence High School, Kolkata, India. Bradstock was the event's global ambassador.

In February 2018, Bradstock was introduced to all the IOC members at the 132nd IOC Session in PyeongChang, South Korea at the 2018 Winter Olympic Games as the "Olympic Picasso" by Olympic Museum Director Francis Gabet. He then spoke for five minutes about the first ever Olympic Art project called "#OlympicArt" that he developed and was going to implement in the coastal Olympic athletes village in Gangneung throughout the 17 days of the 2018 Winter Olympic Games.

In 2025 the American Sport Art Museum & Archives (ASAMA), hosted an art exhibition titled "Unstoppable" by award winning Sports Artist Steven Lester. Bradstock was the subject of one of paintings for the 12-piece solo exhibition under the heading "The Olympic Picasso". The other eleven other paintings subjects were Jessie Owens, Michael Phelps, Simone Biles, Derek Redmond, Keri Strug, Eric Moussambani, Alice Coachman, Yusra Mardini, Brody Malone, Im Dong Hyun and Lopez Lomong.

== Achievements ==
Year	Competition	Venue	Position	Notes
Representing United Kingdom
1984	Olympic Games	Los Angeles, United States	7th	81.22 m
1987	World Championships	Rome, Italy	18th	75.86 m
1988	Olympic Games	Seoul, South Korea	25th	75.96 m
1997	World Championships	Athens, Greece	24th	74.92 m

== Seasonal bests by year ==
- 1973 - 27.00 (old-rule 600g)
- 1978 - 56.06 (old-rule 800g)
- 1979 - 66.06 (old-rule 800g)
- 1980 - 72.72 (old-rule 800g)
- 1981 - 83.20 (old-rule 800g)
- 1982 - 78.88 (old-rule 800g)
- 1983 - 85.32 (old-rule 800g)
- 1984 - 88.28 (old-rule 800g / GB Record)
- 1985 - 91.40 (old-rule 800g / GB Record )
- 1986 - 81.74 ( New-Rule 800g / World Record)
- 1987 - 83.84
- 1988 - 75.96
- 1997 - 74.92
- 2000 - 76.96
- 2002 - 71.97
- 2003 - 74.02
- 2004 - 74.28
- 2005 - 68.81
- 2006 - 70.85
- 2007 - 72.02
- 2008 - 67.17
- 2009 - 72.49
- 2010 - 71.07
- 2011 - 74.73
- 2012 - 72.78 ( 76.16m 700g World Masters Record M50 )
- 2017 - 66.76 ( 700g / World M55 Masters Record )
- 2018 - 61.72 ( 700g / M55 Masters World Champion )
- 2019 - 63.88m ( 700g / World Age (57) Record)
- 2022 - 59.78m ( 600g / British M60 Masters Record )
