= Nadine O'Connor =

American track and field athlete

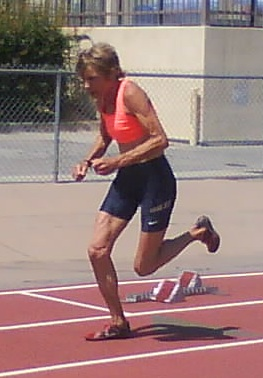
Nadine O'Connor starting a 200m race at Caltech in 2010

Nadine O'Connor (born March 5, 1942) is a retired mathematics teacher and a world record setting, hall of fame Masters Track and Field athlete. While she specializes in the pole vault, due to her athletic training, she also holds the World Masters Athletics world records in the 100 metres, 200 metres, the Indoor 60 metres and 200 metres. She also holds the American record in the long jump, 80 metre hurdles, 300 metre hurdles and pentathlon.

== Pole vault ==
Coached by her partner, Olympian Bud Held, O'Connor continues to improve. Her current world record of 3.19 metres, set at age 67 in the W65 pole vault is so exceptional that it is superior to the record for athletes more than ten years her junior. In the women's rankings, she was at the time 76 cm (about 2 1/2 feet) above the next best performer in her age group, a beamonesque margin. It would also rate her in the top 25 performers in the Men's division, a situation unheard of in any other event. Even O'Connor herself did not jump as high when she was setting records in those younger divisions. She has jumped higher than her world record, unofficially in her private practice facility near San Diego.

== Decathlon ==
Her world record of 10,234 points in the emerging women's decathlon, which uses an age conversion scale for scoring, is the highest recorded score for any athlete, man or woman by almost 1200 points. The conversion factors have been changed in 2010 and again in 2023. With the latter her decathlon score becomes 8138 points, still high.

== Recognition ==
She was elected into the USATF Masters Hall of Fame in 2007. She has been named USATF Female Masters Athlete of the year in 2005 and 2006 and USATF Athlete of the Week, out of athletes of all divisions and genders, three times
