= Irene Obera =

American track and field athlete

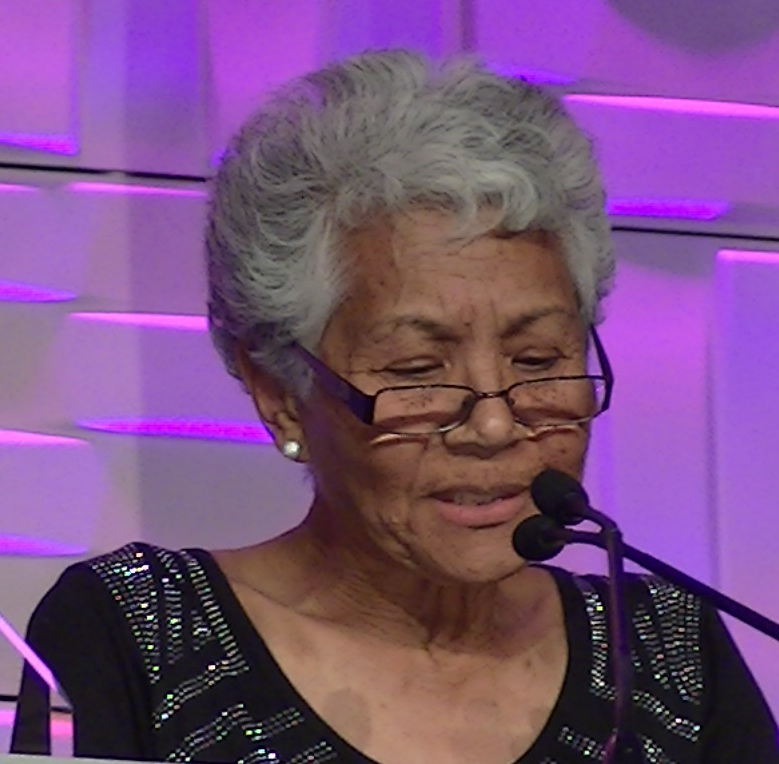
Irene Obera accepting the 2014 Masters Athlete of the Year Award

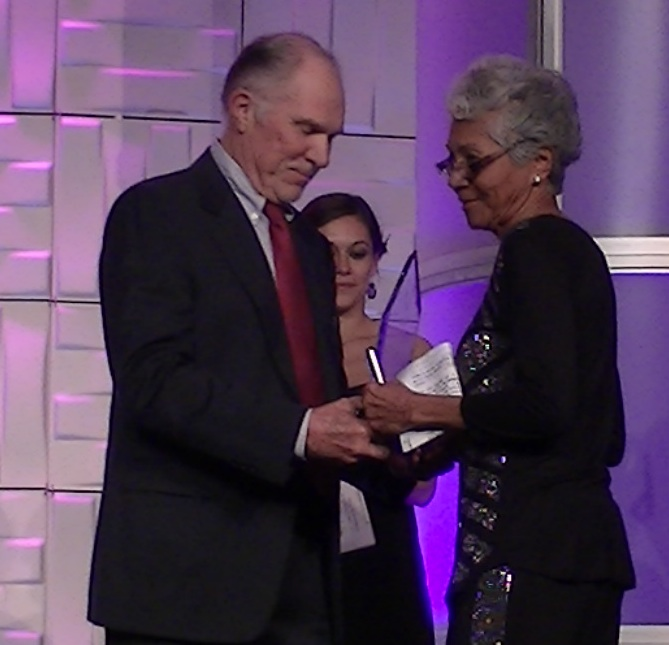
Irene Obera receiving the 2014 Masters Athlete of the Year Award from Masters Chairman Gary Snyder

Irene Romona Obera (born December 7, 1933, in San Bernardino County, California) is an American track and field athlete, specializing in sprinting events. Over an extended career, she has set numerous world records and has won numerous world championships. She is currently a member of the W70 world record holding 4 × 100 metres relay team. She also holds the current American record in the W60 and W75 100 metres and the W75 200 metres.

Obera found her way into the sport relatively late. In the amateur era, most athletes retired about the end of college when the life requirements to make money overrode the time commitment to become a great athlete. Obera attended Chico State College, playing field hockey, softball, and basketball. She graduated with a teaching credential in 1957. After graduation "I was at softball practice when a teammate told me she was a track champion,” she recalls. “I thought to myself, ‘If she is a champion, I know I can be one, too.’ You might say I was a bit cocky.” Obera ran in her first meet in 1958 and made the national championships in 1959 eventually running against the likes of Wilma Rudolph. She ran in the 1960 and 1968 Olympic Trials, the latter just a couple of months before her 35th birthday, running the 100 metres in 12.1 in the semifinals

She was featured in Sports Illustrated's "Faces in the Crowd" in the June 18, 1962, issue.

Obera made her career from 1958 to 1994 as an educator for the Berkeley Unified School District, eventually becoming Berkeley's first female continuation school principal. During her time in the district, Berkeley High School won the state State girls team title in 1974, 1976 and 1981–3, and the boys title in 1980–1.

She was a pioneer in Masters athletics, but it wasn't easy at first. In 1974, she suffered a bout of Sarcoidosis which left her bedridden for most of the year. She heard about the first world Masters championships due to be held in Toronto, Ontario, Canada in 1975. She used the meet as a goal for her recovery. To her surprise, she didn't win there. It motivated her to return.

It wasn't until she reached the 45 age group that world championship wins and records became commonplace. As she passed through each age division W45 to W70, she set the world record in the 200 metres. She performed the same feat W50 to W65 at 100 meters. And W50 through W60 at 400 metres. On January 18, 2014, she became the oldest woman to break 40 seconds for the 200 metres, running 38.10 in an all comers track meet at the University of California, Berkeley.

After setting three world indoor records in the 60 m, 200 m and 400 m, Obera was named USATF "Athlete of the Week" March 19, 2014. In the same meet, she also bested Mary Bowermaster's American record in a new event for her, the Shot Put, but Obera's new record was then bested in the same competition by Gloria Krug. USATF selected Obera ahead of a new M70 weight throw world record by Ed Burke, a new American 15K road racing record by Shalane Flanagan, Phyllis Francis beating Francena McCorory's American indoor record in the 400 meters and Kendell Williams setting an indoor World Junior record in the pentathlon during the same competitive week. She received the honor again on March 25, 2015.

On July 12, 2014, at San Francisco Track and Field Club's Pride Track & Field Meet in Hayward, California, Obera, W80, broke two world records in 80 m hurdles and 200 m hurdles. These marks were her sixth and seventh world marks this year.

In 2019, she made her third appearance in Sports Illustrated's "Faces in the Crowd," the first was in 1962.

In 1996, Obera was elected into the inaugural class of the USATF Masters Hall of Fame.
