= Philipa Raschker =

German-born American masters athlete (born 1947)

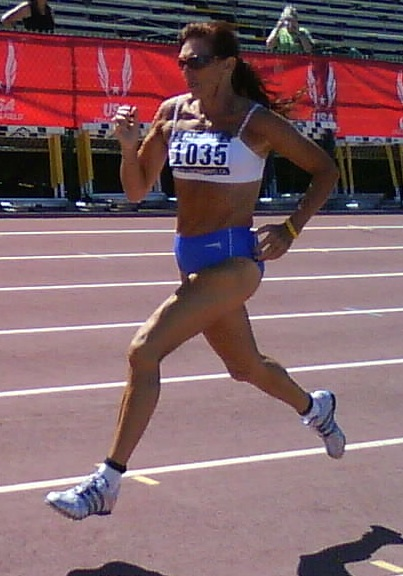
Philippa Raschker at the 2010 USATF Masters Championships

Eileen-Philippa "Phil" Raschker (born February 21, 1947) is a German-born American masters athlete.

Raschker was born in Hamburg, where she first competed in swimming and gymnastics. She first tried track at age 13. She emigrated to the United States in the late 1960s and now is an accountant in Marietta, Georgia. She has amassed 71 Gold Medals at the World Masters Athletics Championships, including the three she won at the most recent championships in 2011, since she began competing at that level in 1983. As of 2010, she holds ten outdoor Masters World Records across sprints, hurdles and jumping events and another dozen indoors.

August 1988 a major milestone was achieved when she was the first female to pole vault at a major USA track and field outdoor championship. She vaulted 8'-0 1/2" (age 40) at the Masters Track and Field Outdoor Championship.

Competing as a 47 year old Masters athlete, Raschker was invited to the inaugural women's Pole Vault at the 1994 USA Outdoor Track and Field Championships. Such was the status of women's pole vaulting at the time, only a few women were experienced in the event. Raschker finished in second place on fewer misses, tying the meet record set moments earlier by winner, then high schooler Melissa Price at 3.25 m (10 ft 7 3/4 in). The following year, Raschker returned to finish in third place behind Price's new American record of 3.89 m (12 ft 9 in) and an upstart from Idaho State University, Stacy Dragila. Dragila went on to win the first Olympic medial in women's pole vault five years later.

== Awards ==
Raschker was named the inaugural 2007 IAAF Masters Athlete of the year and is a two time finalist for the Sullivan Award. She was elected to the USATF Masters Hall of Fame in 1997 and is also a member of the National Senior Games Association Hall of Fame.
