= Masters M55 1500 metres world record progression =

This is the progression of world record improvements of the 1500 metres M55 division of Masters athletics.

Key

Incomplete information Pending

Hand	Auto	Athlete	Nationality	Birthdate	Age	Location	Date	Ref
	4:11.95	Robert Godino	Australia	11 October 1969	56 years, 19 days	Brisbane	30 October 2025	
	4:12.35	Keith Bateman	Australia	29 June 1955	56 years, 7 days	Sacramento	6 July 2011	
4:12.5 h		Ron Robertson	New Zealand	3 June 1941	55 years, 251 days	Wanganui	9 February 1997	
	4:14.33	Günther Hesselmann	Germany	3 August 1925	55 years, 324 days	Essen	23 June 1981	
4:17.6 h		Jack Ryan	Australia	30 April 1922	57 years, 316 days	Box Hill	11 March 1980	
4:26.9 h		Gino Endrizzi	Italy	15 March 1924	55 years, 160 days	Trento	22 August 1979	
